= List of compositions by Edward Elgar =

The following is a list of compositions by Edward Elgar.

== Compositions ==
Works are shown in opus number order (Opp. 1–90), followed by those without opus number, in date order (1867–1933). The list includes incomplete and unpublished works.

Op.	Year	Title	Genre	Notes	Dedication	Words	Pub.
1	1878	Romance	chamber	violin and piano, also with orchestra	Oswin Grainger	—	Schott
1a	1907	The Wand of Youth, Suite No. 1	orchestral	from music written 1867–71; 1. Overture; 2. Serenade; 3. Minuet (Old Style); 4. Sun Dance; 5. Fairy Pipers; 6. Slumber Scene; 7. Fairies and Giants	C. Lee Williams	—	Novello
1b	1908	The Wand of Youth, Suite No. 2	orchestral	from music written 1867–71; 1. March; 2. The Little Bells (Scherzino); 3. Moths and Butterflies (Dance); 4. Fountain Dance; 5. The Tame Bear; 6. The Wild Bears	Hubert A. Leicester	—	Novello
2	1887	Three motets / anthems	church	choir and organ, pub. 1902–1907; 1. "Ave verum corpus"/"Jesu, Word of God Incarnate"; 2. "Ave Maria"/"Jesu, Lord of Life and Glory"; 3. "Ave Maris Stella"/"Jesu, Meek and Lowly"	—	—	Novello
2.1	1902	"Ave verum corpus" / "Jesu, Word of God Incarnate"	church	motet/anthem choir and organ, written 1887	'In Memoriam – W. A. obit 27 January 1887.' (William Allen)	Eucharistic Hymn	Novello
2.2	1907	"Ave Maria" / "Jesu, Lord of Life and Glory"	church	motet/anthem choir and organ, written 1887	Mrs Hubert A. Leicester	Eucharistic Hymn	Novello
2.3	1907	"Ave Maris Stella" / "Jesu, Meek and Lowly"	church	motet/anthem choir and organ, written 1887	Rev. Canon Dolman, O.S.B., Hereford	Eucharistic Hymn	Novello
3	1912	Cantique	keyboard	organ, originally a wind quintet Andante arioso from Harmony Music No. 6 (1879), arr. organ and for orchestra	Hugh Blair	—	Novello
4	1883	Three pieces	chamber	violin and piano 1. Idylle (Esquisse Façile); 2. Pastourelle; 3. Virelai	—	—	—
4.1	1883	Idylle (Esquisse Façile)	chamber	violin and piano	E. E., Inverness	—	Beare, Ashdown
4.2	1883	Pastourelle	chamber	violin and piano	Miss Hilda Fitton, Malvern	—	Swan, Novello
4.3	1883	Virelai	chamber	violin and piano	Frank W. Webb	—	Swan, Novello
5	1903	Two songs	song	voice and piano 1. "A War Song"; 2. unknown	—	—	—
5.1	1903	"A War Song"	song	voice and piano, originally "A Soldier’s Song" (1884)	F. G. P., Worcester (Frederick G. Pedley)	C. Flavell Hayward	Boosey
5.2	1903	unknown	song	voice and piano	—	—	—
6	1878–81	Wind Quintets	chamber	wind quintet: 2 flutes, oboe, clarinet and bassoon/cello see Op. 6.1 — Op. 6.6; 1. Six Promenades; 2. Harmony Music, numbered 1 to 7; 3. Five Intermezzos; 4. Four Dances; 5. Andante con Variazioni "Evesham Andante"; 6. Adagio Cantabile "Mrs. Winslow's Soothing Syrup" pub. posth., first perf. 1934, see also Peckham March (1877) for the same group	—	—	—
6.1	1878	Six Promenades	chamber	wind quintet: 2 flutes, oboe, clarinet and bassoon/cello 1. Moderato e molto maestoso 2. Moderato ”Madame Taussaud's"[sic]: 3. Presto; 4. Andante "Somniferous"; 5. Allegro molto 6. Allegro Maestoso "Hell and Tommy"	—	—	Belwin
6.2	1878–81	Harmony Music	chamber	Nos. 1–6 for wind quintet: 2 flutes, oboe, clarinet, and bassoon/cello, No. 7 a sextet, having also a part for violin.: 1. Allegro Molto (1878); 2. Allegro non tanto (1878); 3. (Allegro) (1878, incomplete); 4. Allegro molto "The Farm Yard" (1879); 5. Allegro moderato "The Mission"; Menuetto and Trio; Andante "Noah's Ark"; Finale (Allegro) (1879); 6. Allegro Molto; Andante arioso (1879); 7. Allegro; Scherzo (1881)	Frank Exton (No. 1); W. B. Leicester (2); Frank Elgar (3)	—	Belwin
6.3	1879	Five Intermezzos	chamber	wind quintet: 2 flutes, oboe, clarinet and bassoon/cello 1. Allegro moderato "The Farmyard"; 2. Adagio Solenne; 3. Allegretto "Nancy"; 4. Andante con moto 5. Allegretto	—	—	Belwin
6.4	1879	Four Dances	chamber	wind quintet: 2 flutes, oboe, clarinet and bassoon/cello 1. Menuetto; 2. Gavotte "The Alphonsa"; 3. Sarabande – Largo; 4. Gigue – Allegro	—	—	Belwin
6.5	1879	Andante con Variazione "Evesham Andante"	chamber	wind quintet: 2 flutes, oboe, clarinet and bassoon/cello	'H. A. L.' (Hubert Leicester)	—	—
6.6	1879	Adagio Cantabile "Mrs Winslow's soothing syrup"	chamber	wind quintet: 2 flutes, oboe, clarinet and bassoon/cello	—	—	Belwin
7	1884	Sevillaña	orchestral	—	W. C. Stockley	—	Tuckwood, Ascherberg
8	1888	Quartet	chamber	string quartet, destroyed	—	—	—
9	1884?	Violin Sonata	chamber	violin and piano, destroyed	—	—	—
10	1899	Three Characteristic Pieces	orchestral	1. Mazurka; 2. Sérénade Mauresque; 3. Contrasts: The Gavotte A.D. 1700 and 1900	Lady Mary Lygon	—	Novello
10.1	1899	Mazurka	orchestral	—	Lady Mary Lygon	—	Novello
10.2	1899	Sérénade Mauresque	orchestral	—	Lady Mary Lygon	—	Novello
10.3	1899	Contrasts: The Gavotte A.D. 1700 and 1900	orchestral	—	Lady Mary Lygon	—	Novello
11	1894	Sursum corda (Élévation)	orchestral	strings, brass, timpani and organ	H. Dyke Acland, Malvern	—	Schott
12	1888	Salut d'Amour (Liebesgruss)	chamber	violin and piano also for piano, orchestra and numerous arrangements	à Carice (C. Alice Elgar)	—	Schott
13	1889–90	Two pieces	chamber	violin and piano 1. Mot d'Amour (1889); 2. Bizarrerie (1890)	—	—	—
13.1	1889	Mot d'Amour	chamber	violin and piano first pub. as Liebesahnung, companion piece to Liebesgruss	Alice (C. Alice Elgar)	—	Ascherberg
13.2	1890	Bizarrerie	chamber	violin and piano	Fred Ward	—	Ascherberg
14	1890	Vesper Voluntaries	keyboard	organ Introduction, 1. Andante, 2. Allegro, 3. Andantino (from Quartet in D, 1888), 4. Allegro piacevole, 5. Poco lento, 6. Moderato, 7. Allegretto pensoso, 8. Poco allegro, Coda	Mrs W. A. Raikes	—	Ascherberg
15	1897–99	Two pieces	chamber	violin and piano 1. Chanson de Nuit; 2. Chanson de Matin	—	—	—
15.1	1897	Chanson de Nuit	chamber	violin and piano, also orchestra (1899), numerous arrangements	F. Ehrke, M.D.	—	Novello
15.2	1899	Chanson de Matin	chamber	violin and piano, also orchestra (1901), numerous arrangements	—	—	Novello
16	1885–94	Three songs	song	voice and piano, repub. 1907 in Seven Lieder; 1. "The Shepherd's Song" (1892); 2. "Through the Long Days" (1885); 3. "Rondel" (1894)	—	—	—
16.1	1892	"The Shepherd's Song"	song	voice and piano, repub. 1907 in Seven Lieder	—	Barry Pain	Tuckwood, Ascherberg
16.2	1885	"Through the Long Days"	song	voice and piano, repub. 1907 in Seven Lieder	—	John Hay	Weber, Ascherberg
16.3	1894	"Rondel"	song	voice and piano, repub. 1907 in Seven Lieder	—	Longfellow, after Froissart	Ascherberg
17	1891	La Capricieuse	chamber	violin and piano	Fred Ward	—	Breitkopf & Härtel
18	1890	Three part-songs	part-song	SATB unacc.: 1. "O Happy Eyes"; 2. "Love"; 3. "My Love Dwelt in a Northern Land"	—	—	Novello
18.1	1890	"O Happy Eyes"	part-song	SATB unacc.	—	C. Alice Elgar	Novello
18.2	1890	"Love"	part-song	SATB unacc.	C. A. E. (C. Alice Elgar)	Arthur Maquarie	Novello
18.3	1890	"My Love Dwelt in a Northern Land"	part-song	SATB unacc.	Rev. J. Hampton	Andrew Lang	Novello
19	1890	Froissart	orchestral	concert-overture	—	—	Novello
20	1888–92	Serenade	orchestral	string orchestra, revised version of Three Pieces for string orchestra 1. Allegro piacevole 2. Larghetto; 3. Allegretto	W. H. Whinfield	—	Breitkopf & Härtel
21	1899	Minuet	orchestral	originally for piano 1897	Paul Kilburn	—	Joseph Williams
22	1892	Very Melodious Exercises in the First Position	chamber	violin and piano	May Grafton	—	Chanot, Laudy
23	1892	"Spanish Serenade"	part-song	"Stars of the Summer Night". SATB acc. 2 violins and piano, also acc. orchestra 1893	—	Longfellow	Novello
24	1892	Études caractéristiques	chamber	violin solo	Adolphe Pollitzer	—	Chanot
25	1889–92	The Black Knight	choral	symphony/cantata for chorus and orchestra, poem by Uhland, tr. Longfellow	Hugh Blair	Longfellow	Novello
26	1894	Two part-songs	part-song	SSA acc. 2 violins and piano 1. "The Snow"; 2. "Fly, Singing Bird"	Mrs E. B. Fitton, Malvern	C. Alice Elgar	Novello
26.1	1894	"The Snow"	part-song	SSA acc. 2 violins and piano, also other vocal arrangements and with orchestra	Mrs E. B. Fitton, Malvern	C. Alice Elgar	Novello
26.2	1894	"Fly, Singing Bird"	part-song	SSA acc. 2 violins and piano, also other vocal arrangements and with orchestra	Mrs E. B. Fitton, Malvern	C. Alice Elgar	Novello
27	1895–96	From the Bavarian Highlands	choral	choral-songs SATB and orchestra 1. "The Dance" (Sonnenbichl); 2. "False Love" (Wamberg); 3. "Lullaby" (In Hammersbach); 4. "Aspiration" (Bei Sankt Anton); 5. "On the Alm" 'True Love'(Hoch Alp); 6. "The Marksmen (Bei Murnau)"; Nos. 1, 3 and 6 arr. for orchestra as Three Bavarian Dances	Mr and Mrs Henry Slingsby Bethell, Garmisch, Bavaria	C. Alice Elgar, adapted from Bavarian folksongs	Joseph Williams
27	1898	Three Bavarian Dances	orchestral	songs from From the Bavarian Highlands arranged for orchestra 1. "The Dance" (Sonnenbichl); 2. "Lullaby" (In Hammersbach); 3. "The Marksmen (Bei Murnau)" also for piano solo, and violin and piano	—	—	Joseph Williams
28	1895	Organ Sonata in G	keyboard	organ	Dr. C. Swinnerton Heap	—	Breitkopf
29	1896	The Light of Life	choral	(Lux Christi) soprano, alto, tenor and bass soloists, chorus and orchestra	Dr. C. Swinnerton Heap	Rev. E. Capel-Cure, adapted from the Scriptures	Novello
30	1896	Scenes from The Saga of King Olaf	choral	cantata for soprano, tenor and bass soloists, chorus and orchestra incl. part-song "As torrents in summer" pub. separately	—	Longfellow and Harry Arbuthnot Acworth	Novello
31	1900	Two songs	song	voice and piano 1. "After"; 2. "A Song of Flight"	—	—	—
31.1	1900	"After"	song	voice and piano	—	Philip Bourke Marston	Boosey
31.2	1900	"A Song of Flight"	song	voice and piano	—	Christina Rossetti	Boosey
32	1897	Imperial March	orchestral	for the Diamond Jubilee of the Queen's accession, also arr. piano	for H.M. Queen Victoria	—	Novello
33	1897	The Banner of St. George	choral	ballad for chorus and orchestra	—	Shapcott Wensley	Novello
34	1897	Te Deum and Benedictus	church	choir and organ	—	Hymn; Benedictus (Song of Zechariah)	Novello
35	1897–98	Caractacus	choral	cantata for soprano, tenor, baritone and bass soloists, chorus and orchestra	H.M. Queen Victoria	H. A. Acworth	Novello
36	1899	Variations on an Original Theme (Enigma)	orchestral	Theme Enigma (andante); I. C.A.E. (andante); II. H.D.S.-P. (allegro); III. R.B.T. (allegretto); IV. W.M.B. (allegro di molto); V. R.P.A. (moderato); VI. Ysobel (andantino); VII. Troyte (presto); VIII. W.N. (allegretto); IX. Nimrod (adagio); X. Intermezzo, Dorabella (allegretto); XI. G.R.S. (allegro di molto); XII. B.G.N. (andante); XIII. Romanza "***" (moderato); Finale E.D.U. (allegro)	'To my friends pictured within': Caroline Alice Elgar; Hew David Steuart-Powell; Robert Baxter Townshend; William Meath Baker; Richard Penrose Arnold; Isabel Fitton; Arthur Troyte Griffith; Winifred Norbury; August Jaeger; Dora Penny; George Robertson Sinclair; Basil George Nevinson; Lady Mary Lygon; Edward Elgar	—	Novello
37	1897–99	Sea Pictures	song	song-cycle for contralto or mezzo-soprano and orchestra (or piano); 1. "Sea-Slumber Song"; 2. "In Haven (Capri)"; 3. "Sabbath Morning at Sea"; 4. "Where Corals Lie"; 5. "The Swimmer"	—	—	Boosey
37.1	1899	"Sea-Slumber Song"	song	from Sea Pictures contralto or mezzo-soprano and orchestra (or piano)	—	Hon. Roden Noel	Boosey
37.2	1899	"In Haven (Capri)"	song	from Sea Pictures contralto or mezzo-soprano and orchestra (or piano) pub. 1897 as Love alone will stay	—	C. Alice Elgar	Boosey
37.3	1899	"Sabbath Morning at Sea"	song	from Sea Pictures contralto or mezzo-soprano and orchestra (or piano)	—	Elizabeth Barrett Browning	Boosey
37.4	1899	"Where Corals Lie"	song	from Sea Pictures contralto or mezzo-soprano and orchestra (or piano)	—	Richard Garnett	Boosey
37.5	1899	"The Swimmer"	song	from Sea Pictures contralto or mezzo-soprano and orchestra (or piano)	—	Adam Lindsay Gordon	Boosey
38	1899–1900	The Dream of Gerontius	choral	for mezzo-soprano, tenor and bass soloists, chorus and orchestra	A.M.D.G.	Cardinal Newman	Novello
39	1901–30	Pomp and Circumstance Marches	orchestral	1. in D (1901); 2. in A minor (1901); 3. in C minor (1904); 4. in G (1907); 5. in C (1930); 6. sketches	—	—	—
39.1	1901	Pomp and Circumstance March No. 1 in D	orchestral	the trio contains the tune known as Land of Hope and Glory	A. E. Rodewald and the members of the Liverpool Orchestral Society	—	Boosey
39.2	1901	Pomp and Circumstance March No. 2 in A minor	orchestral	—	Granville Bantock	—	Boosey
39.3	1904	Pomp and Circumstance March No. 3 in C minor	orchestral	—	Ivor Atkins	—	Boosey
39.4	1907	Pomp and Circumstance March No. 4 in G	orchestral	in 1940 set to words by A. P. Herbert as Song of Liberty	G. R. Sinclair	—	Boosey
39.5	1930	Pomp and Circumstance March No. 5 in C	orchestral	—	Dr. Percy C. Hull, Hereford	—	Boosey
39.6	1930	Pomp and Circumstance March No. 6 in G minor	orchestral	"elaborated" from sketches by Anthony Payne, 2006	—	—	Boosey
40	1900–01	Cockaigne (In London Town)	orchestral	concert-overture	'My friends, the Members of British Orchestras'	—	Boosey
41	1901	Two songs	song	1. "In the Dawn"; 2. "Speak, Music!"	—	—	—
41.1	1901	"In the Dawn"	song	voice and piano	—	A. C. Benson	Boosey
41.2	1901	"Speak, Music!"	song	voice and piano	Mrs E. Speyer, Ridghurst	A. C. Benson	Boosey
42	1901	Grania and Diarmid	incidental	music for a play by George Moore and W. B. Yeats, for orchestra and contralto soloist 1. Incidental Music and Funeral March; 2. Song, "There are seven that pull the thread"	Henry J. Wood	—	Novello
42.1	1901	Incidental Music and Funeral March	incidental	music for orchestra, for a play Grania and Diarmid by George Moore and W. B. Yeats	Henry J. Wood	—	Novello
42.2	1901	"There are seven that pull the thread"	song	for contralto soloist and orchestra, for a play Grania and Diarmid by George Moore and W. B. Yeats	Henry J. Wood	W. B. Yeats	Novello
43	1902	Dream Children	orchestral	Enfants d'un Rêve two pieces for small orchestra, after Charles Lamb, also for piano 1. Andante; 2. Allegretto piacevole	—	—	Joseph Williams, Schott
44	1902	Coronation Ode	choral	for soprano, contralto, tenor and bass soloists, chorus SATB and orchestra I. "Crown the King", for soloists and chorus II(a). "The Queen", for chorus II(b). "Daughter of ancient Kings", for chorus III. "Britain, ask of thyself", for bass solo and men's chorus IV (a). "Hark upon the hallowed air", for soprano and tenor soloists IV(b). "Only let the heart be pure", for soprano, contralto, tenor and bass soloists V. "Peace, gentle peace", for soprano, contralto, tenor and bass soloists and chorus unaccompanied VI. Finale "Land of Hope and Glory", for contralto solo, with chorus (separate song 1902)	H.M. King Edward VII	A. C. Benson	Boosey
45	1902	Five Partsongs from the Greek Anthology	part-song	TTBB, words tr. from the Greek Anthology; 1. "Yea, cast me from height of the mountains" 2. "Whether I find thee" 3. "After many a dusty mile" 4. "It's oh! to be a wild wind" 5. "Feasting I watch"	Sir Walter Parratt	—	Novello
45.1	1902	"Yea, cast me from height of the mountains"	part-song	TTBB, words tr. from the Greek Anthology (anon.)	Sir Walter Parratt	Alma Strettell	Novello
45.2	1902	"Whether I find thee"	part-song	TTBB, words tr. from the Greek Anthology (anon.)	Sir Walter Parratt	Andrew Lang	Novello
45.3	1902	"After many a dusty mile"	part-song	TTBB, words tr. from the Greek Anthology (anon.)	Sir Walter Parratt	Edmund Gosse	Novello
45.4	1902	"It's oh! to be a wild wind"	part-song	TTBB, words tr. from the Greek Anthology (anon.)	Sir Walter Parratt	William M. Hardinge	Novello
45.5	1902	"Feasting I watch"	part-song	TTBB, words tr. from poem by Marcus Argentarius	Sir Walter Parratt	Richard Garnett	Novello
46	1901	Concert Allegro	concertante	for piano, orchestra part possibly added	Written for Fanny Davies	—	?
47	1904–05	Introduction and Allegro	orchestral	for strings (quartet and orchestra)	Prof. S. S. Sanford, Yale University	—	Novello
48	1908	"Pleading"	song	voice and piano, pub. as Op. 48, No. 1, but no other Op. 48 works exist	Lady Maud Warrender	Arthur L. Salmon	Novello
48	1908	Pleading	orchestral	arrangement with flute, oboe, clarinet, cornet, or violin solo	—	—	Elgar Complete Works, Vol. 23
49	1902–03	The Apostles	choral	oratorio for soprano, contralto, tenor and three bass soloists, chorus and orchestra, compiled from the Scriptures by the composer	A.M.D.G.	The Holy Scriptures	Novello
50	1903–04	In the South (Alassio)	orchestral	concert-overture	Leo F. Schuster	—	Novello
51	1901–06	The Kingdom	choral	oratorio for soprano, contralto, tenor and bass soloists, chorus and orchestra, compiled from the Scriptures by the composer	A.M.D.G.	The Holy Scriptures	Novello
52	1907	"A Christmas Greeting"	part-song	carol for 2 sopranos, male chorus ad lib, 2 violins and piano	Dr. G. R. Sinclair and the choristers of Hereford Cathedral	C. Alice Elgar	Novello
53	1907	Four part-songs	part-song	SATB unacc.: 1. "There is sweet Music"; 2. "Deep in my Soul"; 3. "O Wild West Wind"; 4. "Owls (An Epitaph)"	—	—	Novello
53.1	1907	"There is sweet Music"	part-song	part-song SSAATTBB unacc.	Canon Gorton	Lord Tennyson	Novello
53.2	1907	"Deep in my Soul"	part-song	SATB unacc.	Julia H. Worthington	Lord Byron	Novello
53.3	1907	"O Wild West Wind"	part-song	SATB unacc.	Dr. W. G. McNaught	Shelley	Novello
53.4	1907	"Owls (An Epitaph)"	part-song	SATB unacc.	—	Pietro d'Alba	Novello
54	1907	"The Reveille"	part-song	TTBB unacc.	Henry C. Embleton	Bret Harte	Novello
55	1907–08	Symphony No. 1 in A♭	orchestral		Hans Richter, Mus. Doc.	—	Novello
56	1909	"Angelus (Tuscany)"	part-song	SATB unacc.	Mrs. Charles Stuart-Wortley (Alice Stuart-Wortley, 'Windflower')	adapted from the Tuscan dialect	Novello
57	1909	"Go, Song of Mine"	part-song	SSAATB unacc.	Alfred H. Littleton	Dante Gabriel Rossetti, tr. from Cavalcanti	Novello
58	1909	Elegy	orchestral	string orchestra	Rev. R. H. Hadden	—	Novello
59	1910	Three songs	song	1. & 2. not published 3. "Oh, soft was the song" 4. not published 5. "Was it some Golden Star?"; 6. "Twilight"	—	Gilbert Parker	—
59.3	1910	"Oh, soft was the song"	song	mezzo-soprano and piano or orchestra	—	Gilbert Parker	Novello
59.5	1910	"Was it some Golden Star?"	song	mezzo-soprano and piano or orchestra	—	Gilbert Parker	Novello
59.6	1910	"Twilight"	song	mezzo-soprano and piano or orchestra	—	Gilbert Parker	Novello
60	1909–10	Two songs	song	1. "The Torch"; 2. "The River"	—	Pietro d'Alba	—
60.1	1909	"The Torch"	song	mezzo-soprano and piano or orchestra	Yvonne	Pietro d'Alba	Novello
60.2	1910	"The River"	song	mezzo-soprano and piano or orchestra 'Folk-Song (Eastern Europe) paraphrased by Pietro d'Alba'	—	Pietro d'Alba	Novello
61	1901–10	Violin Concerto in B minor	concertante	violin and orchestra	Fritz Kreisler	—	Novello
62	1910	Romance	concertante	bassoon (or cello) and orchestra	Edwin F. James	—	Novello
63	1909–11	Symphony No. 2 in E♭	orchestral		In memory of H.M. King Edward VII	—	Novello
64	1911	"O Hearken Thou"	church	Coronation Offertorium "Intende voci orationis meæ", for choir and orchestra, for the Coronation of King George V	H.M. King George V	Psalm 5	Novello
65	1911	Coronation March	orchestral		H.M. King George V	—	Novello
66	1911–12	The Crown of India	incidental	Imperial Masque for contralto and bass soloists, chorus and orchestra 1a. Introduction, 1b. Sacred Measure, 2. Dance of Nautch Girls, 2a. India Greets her Cities, 3. Song: "Hail, Immemorial Ind!", 3a. Entrance of Calcutta, 3b. Entrance of Delhi, 4a. Introduction, 4b. March of the Mogul Emperors, 5. Entrance of "John Company", 5a. Entrance of St George, 6. Song: "The Rule of England", 7. Interlude, 8a. Introduction, 8b. Warrior's Dance, 9. The Cities of Ind, 11. The Crowning of Delhi, 12. "Ave Imperator!"; also Suite from the Crown of India for orchestra	—	Henry Hamilton	Enoch
67	1912	"Great is the Lord"	church	anthem, choir SSAATB, bass solo, and organ	Dean of Wells, J. Armitage Robinson, D.D.	Psalm 48	Novello
68	1913	Falstaff	orchestral	symphonic study for orchestra, after Shakespeare, King Henry IV and V	Landon Ronald	—	Novello
69	1912	The Music Makers	choral	ode for contralto or mezzo-soprano soloist, chorus SATB and orchestra	Nicholas Kilburn	Arthur O'Shaughnessy	Novello
70	1914	Sospiri	orchestral	string orchestra, harp and organ (or harmonium)	W. H. Reed	—	Breitkopf & Härtel
71	1914	Two part-songs	part-song	SATB unacc.: 1. "The Shower"; 2. "The Fountain"	—	—	—
71.1	1914	"The Shower"	part-song	SATB unacc.	Miss Frances Smart	Henry Vaughan	Novello
71.2	1914	"The Fountain"	part-song	SATB unacc.	W. Mann Dyson	Henry Vaughan	Novello
72	1914	"Death on the Hills"	part-song	choral-song SATB unacc., words tr. from the Russian of Maikov	Lady Colvin	Rosa Newmarch	Novello
73	1914	Two part-songs	part-song	SATB unacc.: 1. "Love's Tempest"; 2. "Serenade"	—	—	—
73.1	1914	"Love's Tempest"	part-song	SATB unacc., words tr. from the Russian of Maikov	Prof. C. Sanford Terry	Rosa Newmarch	Novello
73.2	1914	"Serenade"	part-song	SATB unacc., words tr. from the Russian of Maikov	Percy C. Hull	Rosa Newmarch	Novello
74	1914	"Give unto the Lord"	church	anthem SATB, organ and orchestra	Sir George Martin, M.V.O., Mus.D.	Psalm 29	Novello
75	1914	Carillon	orchestral	recitation with orchestra	—	Émile Cammaerts	Elkin
76	1915	Polonia	orchestral	symphonic prelude	I. J. Paderewski	—	Elkin
77	1915	Une voix dans le désert	orchestral	recitation with soprano solo and orchestra, includes the song "Quand nos bourgeons se rouvriront" (When the spring comes round)	—	Émile Cammaerts	Elkin
77.1	1915	"Quand nos bourgeons se rouvriront" (When the spring comes round	song	from Une voix dans le désert, Op. 77	—	Émile Cammaerts	Elkin
78	1915–16	The Starlight Express	incidental	baritone and soprano soloists and orchestra, music to a play adapted from a story A Prisoner in Fairyland by Algernon Blackwood, includes the organ-grinder’s songs: 1. "To the Children"; 2. "The Blue-Eyes Fairy"; 3. "My Old Tunes"	—	Algernon Blackwood	Elkin
79	1917	Le drapeau belge (The Belgian Flag)	orchestral	recitation with orchestra, tr. Lord Curzon of Kedleston	—	Émile Cammaerts	Elkin
80	1915–17	The Spirit of England	choral	tenor or soprano solo, chorus and orchestra 1. The Fourth of August (1917); 2. To Women (1915); 3. For the Fallen (1915)	'To the memory of our glorious men, with a special thought for the Worcesters'	—	Novello
80.1	1917	The Fourth of August	choral	tenor or soprano solo, chorus and orchestra, from The Winnowing Fan by Binyon	—	Laurence Binyon	Novello
80.2	1915	To Women	choral	tenor or soprano solo, chorus and orchestra	—	Laurence Binyon	Novello
80.3	1915	For the Fallen	choral	tenor or soprano solo, chorus and orchestra	—	Laurence Binyon	Novello
80.3	1920	With Proud Thanksgiving	choral	chorus SATB and orchestra, a simpler version of For the Fallen, for the dedication of the Cenotaph	League of Arts	Laurence Binyon	Novello
81	1917	The Sanguine Fan	ballet	ballet music for orchestra. Echo's Dance arranged for piano	—	—	MS
81	1917	Echo's Dance	arrangement	from The Sanguine Fan, Op. 81, arranged for piano	—	—	Elkin
82	1918	Violin Sonata in E minor	chamber	violin and piano	'M. J. – 1918' (Marie Joshua)	—	Novello
83	1918	String Quartet in E minor	chamber	string quartet	Brodsky Quartet	—	Novello
84	1918–19	Piano Quintet in A minor	chamber	string quartet and piano	Ernest Newman	—	Novello
85	1918–19	Cello Concerto in E minor	concertante	cello and orchestra	Sidney and Frances Colvin	—	Novello
86	1921–22	Fantasia and Fugue in C minor (J. S. Bach)	arrangement	transcription for orchestra, Fantasia 1921, Fugue 1922	—	—	Novello
87	1930	The Severn Suite	brass band	transcribed for orchestra (1932)); 1. Introduction (Worcester Castle); 2. Toccata (Tournament); 3. Fugue (The Cathedral) (1923); 4. Minuet (Commandery); 5. Coda	G. Bernard Shaw	—	R Smith
87a	1933	Organ Sonata No. 2	keyboard	arrangement of The Severn Suite for organ by Ivor Atkins	—	—	Keith Prowse
88	1932–34	Symphony No. 3	orchestral	posth. Op. 88, sketches, elaborated by Anthony Payne 1972–97	—	—	Boosey
89	1933	The Spanish Lady	opera	libretto by Elgar and Sir Barry Jackson after Ben Jonson, planned in two acts but incomplete, posth. Suite for string orchestra ed. Percy M. Young songs:1. "Modest and Fair"; 2. "Still to be Neat" also suite for strings ed. Young (1956)	—	Ben Jonson	Elkin
90	1909–25	Piano Concerto	concertante	piano and orchestra, posth. Op. 90, sketches, 1909–25, elaborated by Robert Walker 1997	—	—	?
1001	1919	The Smoking Cantata	song	baritone soloist and orchestra	—	—	?
	1867	Humoreske 'a tune from Broadheath'	piano	later used for Fairies and Giants in The Wand of Youth, Suite No. 1, see Op. 1a	—	—	—
	1867	The Wand of Youth	incidental	music for a children’s play, assembled as two orchestral suites in 1907, see Op. 1a and Op. 1b	—	—	—
	1868	Kyrie Eleison in A	church	choir SATB	—	—	—
	1870	Fugue in G minor	keyboard	for organ [?], c. 1870, unfinished	—	—	—
	1872	"The Language of Flowers"	song	voice and piano, unpub.	'The Music composed & dedicated to my sister Lucy'	The Poetry by Percival	MS
	1872	Chantant	keyboard	piano solo	—	—	MS
	1872	Gloria	church	for choir and organ, arr. using the piano part of the Allegro from Violin Sonata in F, K.547 (Mozart)	—	—	MS
	1873	Credo	arrangement	choir and organ, themes from Symphonies V VII and IX (Beethoven) "arr. Bernard Pappenheim" [comment by Elgar]	—	—	MS
	1874	Anthem	arrangement	arr. for strings, with original introduction	—	—	MS
	1875	"The Self Banished"	song	soprano or tenor acc. piano, unpub.	—	Edmund Waller	MS
	1876	Salve Regina	church	in D, choir and organ	—	—	MS
	1876	Tantum Ergo	church	in D, choir and organ	—	Eucharistic Hymn	MS
	1877	"O Salutaris Hostia"	church	in G, bass solo and organ	—	O Salutaris Hostia	MS
	1877	Credo in E minor	church	choir and organ	—	Nicene Creed	MS
	1877	Gloria	church	choir SATB and organ	—	—	MS
	1877	Kyrie	church	choir STB	—	—	MS
	1877	Five well-known pieces	arrangement	arr. as studies for the violin, at the suggestion of Adolphe Pollitzer; 1. Larghetto (Mozart); 2. Cavatina (Raff); 3. Romance (de Bériot); 4. Romance (Vieuxtemps); 5. Gigue (Ries)	—	—	Schott
	1877	Peckham March	chamber	Harmony Music for wind quintet: 2 flutes, oboe, clarinet and bassoon/cello see also Op. 6.1 — Op. 6.6	—	—	MS
	1877	Reminiscences	chamber	violin and piano	O. G.	—	MS
	1877	Exercise for the 3rd finger	chamber	violin solo	Jascha Heifetz (1920)	—	MS
	1878	Adeste Fideles (John F. Wade)	arrangement	arr. for orchestra	—	—	MS
	1878	Violin Sonata Op. 23, finale (Beethoven)	arrangement	arr. for wind quintet	—	—	MS
	1878	Concerto X (Corelli)	arrangement	arr. for wind quintet	—	—	MS
	1878	Ariodante overture (Handel)	arrangement	arr. for small orchestra	—	—	MS
	1878	O ‘tis a glorious sight from Oberon (Weber)	arrangement	arr. for small orchestra	F. G. Pedley	—	MS
	1878	Fantasia	chamber	violin and piano, unfinished	—	—	MS
	1878	Fugue in D minor	chamber	oboe and violin	Frank Elgar and Karl Bammert	—	MS
	1878	String Quartet in D	chamber	unfinished	—	—	MS
	1878	String Quartet in B♭	chamber	unfinished	—	—	MS
	1878	String Trio in C	chamber	unfinished	—	—	MS
	1878	Trio	chamber	2 violins and piano, unfinished	—	—	MS
	1878	Allegro	chamber	oboe, violin, viola and cello, unfinished	—	—	MS
	1878	Menuetto (Scherzo)	chamber	re-copied 1930	—	—	MS
	1878	Symphony in G minor after Mozart	orchestral	part of first movement exists	—	—	MS
	1878	Introductory Overture for Christy Minstrels	orchestral	—	—	—	MS
	1878	"Brother, For Thee He Died" (Easter Anthem)	church	choir and organ	—	—	MS
	1878	"Praise ye the Lord"	church	hymn tune, revised as Good Morrow	—	—	
	1878	"Now with the fast-departing light"	church	hymn tune in G, choir and organ, 'Broadheath'	—	Edward Caswall	MS
	1878	"Hear Thy children"	church	hymn tune in F, choir and organ, pub. 1896 as Drakes Broughton in Westminster Hymnal, and Parish Hymn Book (Nos. 189/190), also used in Nursery Suite (Aubade)	—	Francis Stanfield	Cary
	1878	"If She Love Me" (Temple Bar Rondeau)	song	voice and piano	—	—	MS
	1878	Minuet in G minor	orchestral	minuet for Powick Asylum band: flute, clarinet, 2 cornets, euphonium, bombardon, 1st & 2nd violins, double bass and piano	—	—	MS
	1879	"Domine salvam fac reginam"	church	motet, choir and organ	—	Latin hymn	MS
	1879–84	Powick Asylum Music	orchestral	for Powick Asylum band: 1. La Brunette (1879); 2. Die Junge Kokette (1879); 3. L'Assomoir (1879); 4. The Valentine (1879); 5. Maud (1880); 6. Paris (1880); 7. Nelly (1881); 8. La Blonde (1882); 9. Helcia (1883); 10. Blumine (1884)	—	—	MS
	1879	La Brunette	orchestral	5 Quadrilles for Powick Asylum band: piccolo, flute, clarinet, 2 cornets, euphonium, bombardon, 1st & 2nd violins, double bass and piano	Geo. Jenkins Esq.	—	MS
	1879	Die Junge Kokette	orchestral	5 Quadrilles for Powick Asylum band: piccolo, flute, clarinet, 2 cornets, bombardon, 1st & 2nd violins, double bass and piano	Miss J. Holloway	—	MS
	1879	Two Polonaises	chamber	violin and piano, unfinished	" J. H. [Miss J. Holloway] with esteem"	—	MS
	1879	L'Assomoir	orchestral	5 Quadrilles for Powick Asylum band: flute, clarinet, 2 cornets, euphonium, bombardon, 1st & 2nd violins, double bass and piano	—	—	MS
	1879	The Valentine	orchestral	5 Lancers for Powick Asylum band: piccolo, flute, clarinet, 2 cornets, euphonium, bombardon, 1st & 2nd violins, double bass and piano	—	—	MS
	1879	Minuet-grazioso	orchestral	lost or destroyed	—	—	
	1880	Maud	orchestral	polka for Powick Asylum band: piccolo, flute, clarinet, 2 cornets, euphonium, bombardon, 1st & 2nd violins, double bass and piano	—	—	MS
	1880	Paris	orchestral	5 Quadrilles for Powick Asylum band: piccolo, flute, clarinet, 2 cornets, euphonium, bombardon, 1st & 2nd violins, double bass and piano 1. Châtelet; 2. L'Hippodrome; 3. Alcazar d'Été (Champs-Élysées); 4. La! Suzanne; 5. Café des Ambassadeurs: "La femme de l'emballeur"	Miss J. Holloway, Powycke	—	MS
	1880	Violin Sonata in F, K.547 (Mozart)	arrangement	arr. as Gloria	—	—	MS
	1880	"O Salutaris Hostia"	church	in F, choir and organ	—	O Salutaris Hostia	MS
	1880	"O Salutaris Hostia"	church	in E♭, choir and organ	—	O Salutaris Hostia	MS
	1881	Fantasy on Irish Airs	chamber	violin and piano, unfinished	—	—	MS
	1881	Fugue in F♯ minor	chamber	incomplete – later copied for The Spanish Lady	—	—	MS
	1881	Nelly	orchestral	polka for Powick Asylum band: piccolo, flute, clarinet, 2 cornets, euphonium, bombardon, 1st & 2nd violins, viola, double bass and piano	Fras. Thos. Elgar	—	MS
	1882	La Blonde	orchestral	polka for Powick Asylum band: piccolo, clarinet, 2 cornets, trombone, bombardon, 1st & 2nd violins, double bass and piano	'H. J. W.' (Helen Weaver)	—	MS
	1882	Douce Pensée	chamber	violin, cello and piano, pub. 1915 as Rosemary	—	—	MS
	1882	Suite in D	orchestral	1. Mazurka; 2. Intermezzo-Sérénade Mauresque; 3. Fantasia gavotte 4. Marche – Pas Redoublé; Revised 1899 as Three Characteristic Pieces (see Op. 10)	—	—	MS
	1882	"O Salutaris Hostia"	church	in E♭, bass solo and organ	—	O Salutaris Hostia	MS
	1882	Benedictus in G	church	for choir, organ and strings	—	—	MS
	1882	Four Litanies for the Blessed Virgin Mary	church	choir unacc.	Fr. T. Knight, S.J., Worcester	—	Cary
	1882	Air de Ballet – Pastorale	orchestral	perf. Worcester	—	—	MS
	1882	Marche – Pas Redoublé	orchestral	perf. Worcester Marche incorporated into The Spanish Lady and Suite in D	—	—	MS
	1882	Air de Ballet	orchestral	perf. Worcester	—	—	MS
	1883	Scherzo (Schumann)	arrangement	arr. Scherzo from Overture, Scherzo and Finale, Op. 52, for piano solo	—	—	MS
	1883	Entry of the Minstrels from Tannhaüser Act III, (Wagner)	arrangement	for piano	—	—	MS
	1883	Helcia	orchestral	polka for Powick Asylum band: piccolo, clarinet, 2 cornets, euphonium, bombardon, 1st & 2nd violins, viola, double bass and piano	—	—	MS
	1884	Blumine	orchestral	polka for Powick Asylum band: clarinet, 2 cornets, euphonium, bombardon, 1st & 2nd violins, double bass and piano	—	—	MS
	1884	Griffinesque	keyboard	piano, pub. posth. by Novello	—	—	Novello
	1884	"A Soldier’s Song"	song	see "A War Song", Op. 5.1	—	—	—
	1885	"Clapham Town End"	song	low voice and piano, arrangement of an old Yorkshire folksong, unpub. "An old Yorkshire ballad taken down from the singing of old Tommy Kerr [?] as he got it from his grandfather. Harmonised in strict accordance with the spirit of the age" [comment by Elgar]	Dr. C. W. Buck	trad.	Young
	1885	"Clapham Town End"	arrangement	see Clapham Town End, song	—	—	
	1885	Gavotte	chamber	violin and piano	Dr. C. W. Buck, Settle	—	Schott
	1885	Absent and Present (Maude Valérie White)	arrangement	cello obbligato, end note – "Lobster cutlets! Oh!!!!!!" [comment by Elgar]	—	—	MS
	1885	Out on the Rocks (C. H. Dolby)	arrangement	cello obbligato	—	—	MS
	1885	Melody (C. W. Buck)	arrangement	piano accompaniment for cello	—	—	MS
	1885	The Lakes overture	orchestral	MS lost	—	—	
	1885	Scottish Overture	orchestral	MS lost	—	—	
	1886	Petite reine – Berceuse, (G. F. Blackbourne)	arrangement	violin and piano, pub. 1907	—	—	Willcocks & Co.
	1886	Stabat Mater	church	SATB unacc.	—	Latin hymn	MS
	1886	"Is she not passing fair?"	song	pub. 1908, Lay, tr. from poem by Charles, Duke of Orléans (1391–1466)	—	Louisa Stuart Costello	Boosey
	1886	Trio	chamber	violin, cello and piano, fragment only of first movement, "Sans"	—	—	MS
	1886	Enina Valse	keyboard	piano, dated Malvern Wells 21 Dec 1886	—	—	MS
	1887	Duett for trombone and double bass	chamber	trombone and double bass, pub. 1970, ed. Rodney Slatford	Frank William Weaver, on his wedding-day	—	Yorke
	1888	"As I laye a-thynkynge"	song	voice and piano, the last lines of Thomas Ingoldsby	—	Thomas Ingoldsby	Beare
	1888	"The Wind at Dawn"	song	voice and piano	Ludwig Wüllner	C. Alice Roberts (Elgar)	Boosey
	1888	Allegretto on G.E.D.G.E.	chamber	violin and piano	The Misses Gedge, Malvern Wells	—	Schott
	1888	"Ecce Sacerdos Magnus"	church	choir and organ	Hubert Leicester, Worcester	Liturgy	Cary
	1888	Liebesgruss	chamber	see Salut d'Amour, Op. 12	—	—	—
	1889	Liebesahnung	chamber	see Mot d'Amour, Op. 13.1	—	—	
	1889	"Queen Mary's Song"	song	voice and piano, repub. 1907 in Seven Lieder	J. H. Meredith	Alfred Tennyson	Orsborn & Tuckwood, Ascherberg
	1889	Presto	keyboard	piano	—	—	
	1890	"Man"	song	voice and piano	—	—	
	1890	Violin Concerto	concertante	destroyed	—	—	
	1892	"A Song of Autumn"	song	voice and piano, repub. 1907 in Seven Lieder	Miss Marshall	Adam Lindsay Gordon	Orsborn & Tuckwood, Ascherberg
	1892	"Like to the Damask Rose"	song	voice and piano, repub. 1907 in Seven Lieder	—	Simon Wastell or Francis Quarles	Tuckwood, Ascherberg
	1892	"The Poet's Life"	song	voice and piano, repub. 1907 in Seven Lieder	—	Ellen Burroughs	Ascherberg
	1892	"A spear, a sword"	song	voice and piano, unpub.	—	C. Alice Elgar	
	1892	Mill-wheel Songs	song	voice and piano, unpub.: 1. "Winter"; 2. "May (a rhapsody)"	—	C. Alice Elgar	
	1894	"The Wave"	song	voice and piano, unpub.	—	—	
	1894	"Muleteer's Serenade"	song	voice and piano	—	Barry Pain	
	1894	Parsifal, Good Friday Music (Wagner)	arrangement	for small orchestra, Worcester High School	—	—	
30	1896	"As torrents in summer"	part-song	SATB unacc., from Scenes from the Saga of King Olaf, Op. 30, pub. separately,	—	Longfellow	Novello
29	1896	"Seek Him that maketh the Seven Stars"	song	tenor solo and chorus TTBB, from The Light of Life, Op. 29, pub. separately	—	Rev. E. Capel-Cure	Novello
29	1896	"Doubt not thy Father's care"	song	duet, soprano and alto, from The Light of Life, Op. 29, pub. separately	—	Rev. E. Capel-Cure	Novello
35	1897	"The Sword Song"	song	baritone, from Caractacus, Op. 35, pub. separately	H.M Queen Victoria	H. A. Acworth	Novello
	1897	"Roundel: The little eyes that never knew Light"	song	voice and piano, composed 1887, unpub.	—	A. C. Swinburne	MS
	1897	"Grete Malverne on a Rocke"	part-song	Christmas carol SATB unacc., pub. 1909 as Lo, Christ the Lord is born	—	trad.	Christmas Card
	1898	"The Holly and the Ivy"	arrangement	Christmas carol, chorus and orchestra	—	trad.	
	1898	Festival March in C	choral	chorus and orchestra, fragment only remains	—	—	
	1898	"Love alone will stay"	song	voice and piano, published in "The Dome", later adapted as In Haven, No. 2 of Sea Pictures, Op. 37	—	C. Alice Elgar	Paternoster Press
	1898	"O Salutaris Hostia"	church	choir unacc., in Tozer’s Benediction Manual No. 47	—	O Salutaris Hostia	Cary
	1899	"Dry those fair, those crystal eyes"	song	voice and piano	—	Henry King	Charing + Hospital Bazaar
	1899	"To her beneath whose stedfast star"	part-song	SATB unacc., orchestrated 1902	H.M. Queen Victoria	Frederic W. H. Myers	Macmillan
12	1899	"Woo thou, sweet Music"	song	voice and piano, from Salut d’Amour, Op. 12, adapted by Max Laistner	—	A. C. Bunten	Schott
	1899	Sérénade Lyrique	orchestral	—	Ivan Caryll’s Orchestra	—	Chappell
	1900	"Pansies"	song	voice and piano, from Salut d’Amour, Op. 12, adapted by Max Laistner	—	Percy E. Pinkerton	Schott
	1900	"The Pipes of Pan"	song	voice and piano	—	Adrian Ross	Boosey
	1901	"Always and Everywhere"	song	voice and piano, from the Polish of Krasiński	—	F. H. Fortey	Boosey
	1901	"Come, Gentle Night!"	song	voice and piano	—	Clifton Bingham	Boosey
	1901	May-Song	keyboard	piano, for orchestra (Elkin, 1928)	—	Mrs. T. Garmston Hyde	W. H. Broome; Morrice Music; Elkin
	1901	Emmaus (Herbert Brewer)	arrangement	orchestration	—	—	
	1902	"Land of Hope and Glory"	song	voice and piano or orchestra, from Coronation Ode, Op.44	—	A. C. Benson	Boosey
	1902	"O Mightiest of the Mighty"	church	hymn for the Coronation of Edward VII	H.R.H. Prince of Wales (later H.M. King Edward VII)	Rev. S. Childs Clarke	Novello
	1902	"God Save the King" (or "My Country Tis of Thee")	arrangement	soloists, chorus and orchestra	—	—	Novello
	1903	"Speak, my Heart!"	song	voice and piano	—	A. C. Benson	Boosey
	1903	"Weary Wind of the West"	part-song	SATB unacc.	—	T. E. Brown	Novello
	1903	Offertoire (Andante Religioso)	chamber	violin and piano, "Offertoire pour le violon, Gustave Francke (op.11)"	dédié à Serge Derval, Anvers	—	Boosey
	1903	Skizze	keyboard	piano, repub. Novello	Prof. Julius Buths, Düsseldorf	—	Musik-Beilag zur Nuen Musik-Zeitung (Stuttgart), Novello
50	1904	Canto Popolare	chamber	viola and piano, arranged by the composer from his concert-overture In the South (Alassio), Op. 50	—	—	Boosey
50	1904	"In Moonlight"	song	voice and piano, adapted to the viola serenade Canto Popolare from the concert-overture In the South (Alassio), Op. 50	—	Shelley	Boosey
	1905	"Evening Scene"	part-song	SATB unacc.	In Memory of R. G. H. Howson	Coventry Patmore	Novello
	1905	In Smyrna	keyboard	piano, pub. "Queen's Christmas Carol Book", repub. Novello	—	—	Daily Mail, Novello
	1906	Piece for Organ	keyboard	organ, "For Dot's Nuns" [remark by Elgar]	—	—	
	1907	Berceuse – Petite reine		see Petite reine – Berceuse			
	1907	Andantino (Victor Bérard)	arrangement	violin, mandolin and guitar "For the Barbers" [remark by Elgar], unfinished	—	—	
	1907	Two single chants for Venite in D and G	church	choir, in "New Cathedral Psalter"	—	—	Novello
	1907	Two double chants in D for Psalms 68 and 75	church	choir, in "New Cathedral Psalter"	—	—	Novello
	1907	String quartet	chamber	fragmentary	—	—	
	1907	"How calmly the evening"	part-song	SATB unacc.	—	Thomas Toke Lynch	Novello
	1907	Seven Lieder of Edward Elgar	song	voice and piano 1. "Like to the Damask Rose"; 2. "Queen Mary's Song"; 3. "A Song of Autumn"; 4. "The Poet's Life"; 5. "Through the Long Days"; 6. "Rondel"; 7. "The Shepherd's Song" all first pub. 1889–1894	—	—	Boosey
	1908	"Follow the Colours"	song	Marching song for solo, piano/orchestra/military band, and optional male chorus Republished 1914	Worshipful Company of Musicians	Capt. W. de Courcy Stretton	Novello
	1908	Marching Song	–	see "Follow the Colours"	—	—	
	1908	"Abide with me" (Ivor Atkins)	arrangement	anthem, rev. 1928	—	—	
	1909	"Lo! Christ the Lord is Born"	church	Christmas carol SATB unacc., after Grete Malverne on a Rocke, 1897	—	Shapcott Wensley	Novello
	1910	"A Child Asleep"	song	voice and piano	Anthony Goetz	Elizabeth Barrett Browning	Novello
	1910	"The King's Way"	song	voice and piano	—	C. Alice Elgar	Boosey
	1910	"They are at Rest"	church	anthem for choir and organ, perf. at the Royal Mausoleum for the anniversary of Queen Victoria's death	—	Cardinal Newman	Novello
	1911	St Matthew Passion (J. S. Bach)	arrangement	performing edition, with Ivor Atkins	—	—	Novello
	1911	St Matthew Passion (J. S. Bach)	arrangement	two chorales "O Mensch bewein dein Sünde Gross" BWV 622, "O Haupt voll Blut und Wunden" BWV 244, for 3 trumpets, 4 horns, 3 trombones and tuba	—	—	MS
	1913	"Callicles"	song	Scena, intended for Muriel Foster	—	Matthew Arnold	—
	1913	Carissima	orchestral	—	Winifred Stephens	—	Elkin
	1914	"Fear not, O Land"	church	Harvest Anthem	—	Joel ii	Novello
	1914	"Arabian Serenade"	song	voice and piano	—	Margery Lawrence	Boosey
	1914	"The Chariots of the Lord"	song	voice and piano	—	Rev. John Brownlie	Boosey
	1914	"The Birthright"	part-song	boys' voices unison acc. bugles and drums or SATB unacc.	—	George A. Stocks	Novello
	1914	"The Merry-go-round"	song	unison song acc. piano, pub. USA	—	Florence C. Fox	Silver Burdett
	1915	Rosemary	orchestral	orchestration of Douce Pensée (1882) for piano trio	—	—	Elkin
	1915	"Quand nos bourgeons se rouvriront"	song	see Une voix dans le désert, Op. 77	—	—	—
	1915	"The Brook"	part-song	2-part song acc. piano, pub. USA	—	Ellen Soule	Silver Burdett
	1915	"The Windlass Song"	part-song	SATB unacc., pub. USA	—	William Allingham	Silver Burdett
	1916	"Fight for Right"	song	voice and piano	Members of the Fight for Right Movement	William Morris	Elkin
	1917	"Ozymandias"	song	voice and piano	—	Shelley	—
	1917	The Fringes of the Fleet	song	songs for four baritones and orchestra, 1. "The Lowestoft Boat (A Chanty)"; 2. "Fate's Discourtesy"; 3. "Submarines"; 4. "The Sweepers"; 5. "Inside the Bar (A Sailor's Song)" added later	'To my friend Admiral Lord Beresford'	Rudyard Kipling	Enoch
	1917	"The Lowestoft Boat (A Chanty)"	song	four baritones and orchestra, from The Fringes of the Fleet	—	Rudyard Kipling	Enoch
	1917	"Fate's Discourtesy"	song	four baritones and orchestra, from The Fringes of the Fleet	—	Rudyard Kipling	Enoch
	1917	"Submarines"	song	four baritones and orchestra, from The Fringes of the Fleet	—	Rudyard Kipling	Enoch
	1917	"The Sweepers"	song	four baritones and orchestra, from The Fringes of the Fleet	—	Rudyard Kipling	Enoch
	1917	"Inside the Bar (A Sailor's Song)"	song	four baritones unaccompanied added to The Fringes of the Fleet, dedicated to the four singers	Charles Mott, Harry Barratt, Frederick Henry and Frederick Stewart	Gilbert Parker	Enoch
	1918	"Big Steamers"	song	unison song for children, acc. piano	—	Rudyard Kipling	Teachers' World
	1922	"Ye Holy Angels bright"	arrangement	orchestral accompaniment	—	John Darwall	
	1922	"Jerusalem" (Parry)	arrangement	for chorus and orchestra	—	William Blake	
	1923	Arthur	incidental	to a play by Laurence Binyon	—	—	
	1923	"The Wanderer"	part-song	TTBB unacc.	—	Anon., adapted from Wit and Drollery, 1661	Novello
	1923	"Zut, zut, zut!"	part-song	TTBB unacc.	—	Richard Marden	Novello
	1923	Memorial Chimes	keyboard	for the opening of the Loughborough War Memorial Carillon	—	William Wooding Starmer	MS
	1923	Overture in D minor (Handel)	arrangement	transcription for orchestra of the Overture in D minor (Chandos Anthem "In the Lord put I my Trust", HWV247)	—	—	Novello
	1923	"O Lord, look down from Heaven" (Battishill)	arrangement	orchestral accompaniment	—	—	MS
	1923	"Let us Lift up our Hearts" (S. S. Wesley)	arrangement	orchestral accompaniment	—	—	MS
	1924	Empire March	orchestral	—	—	—	Enoch
	1924	Arthur: Suite	orchestral	for chamber orchestra (from the incidental music to Binyon's Arthur	—	—	MS
	1924	Pageant of Empire	incidental	solo songs, except No. 8 "A Song of Union" for SATB; Nos. 5 and 7 were also later arranged for chorus SATB; some also with orchestral accompaniment 1. "Shakespeare's Kingdom"; 2. "The Islands (A Song of New Zealand)"; 3. "The Blue Mountains (A Song of Australia)"; 4. "The Heart of Canada"; 5. "Sailing Westward"; 6. "Merchant Adventurers"; 7. "The Immortal Legions"; 8. "A Song of Union" (part-song SATB)	—	Alfred Noyes	Enoch
	1924	"Shakespeare's Kingdom"	song	solo voice and orchestra from Pageant of Empire	—	Alfred Noyes	Enoch
	1924	"The Islands (A Song of New Zealand)"	song	solo voice and orchestra from Pageant of Empire	—	Alfred Noyes	Enoch
	1924	"The Blue Mountains (A Song of Australia)"	song	solo voice and orchestra from Pageant of Empire	—	Alfred Noyes	Enoch
	1924	"The Heart of Canada"	song	solo voice, SATB chorus and orchestra from Pageant of Empire	—	Alfred Noyes	Enoch
	1924	"Sailing Westward"	song	solo voice and orchestra from Pageant of Empire, later arranged for chorus SATB	—	Alfred Noyes	Enoch
	1924	"Merchant Adventurers"	song	solo voice and orchestra from Pageant of Empire	—	Alfred Noyes	Enoch
	1924	"The Immortal Legions"	song	solo voice and orchestra from Pageant of Empire, later arranged for chorus SATB	—	Alfred Noyes	Enoch
	1924	"A Song of Union"	part-song	SATB chorus and orchestra from Pageant of Empire, trio of Empire March	—	Alfred Noyes	Enoch
	1924	March	chamber	violin, cello and piano, intended also for orchestra	The Grafton family	—	
	1924	"The Song of the Bull"	part-song	male voices and piano, for Cambridge University May Week	—	F. Hamilton	—
	1925	"The Herald"	part-song	SATB unacc.	—	Alexander Smith	Novello
	1925	"The Prince of Sleep"	part-song	SATB unacc.	—	Walter de la Mare	Elkin
	1927	Civic Fanfare	orchestral	orchestra without violins	Dr. Percy C. Hull	—	MS
	1928	May-Song	orchestral	from the original for piano	—	—	
	1928	Beau Brummel	incidental	dramatic music to a play by Bertram Matthews. MS full score mostly missing, except for the Minuet, found in c2006.	—	Bertram P. Matthews	MS
	1928	Minuet from Beau Brummel	orchestral	arr. for full orch. by Elgar: arr. for piano solo by Ernest Austin	—	—	Elkin
	1928	"I sing the Birth"	church	Christmas carol SATB unacc.	Rev. Harcourt B. S. Fowler	Ben Jonson	Novello
	1929	"Good Morrow"	church	'A simple carol for His Majesty's happy recovery', SATB unacc. or acc. piano	H.M. King George V	George Gascoigne	Novello
	1929	"Jehova, quam multi sunt hostes mei" (Purcell)	arrangement	orchestral accompaniment	—	—	MS
	1930	"It isnae me"	song	voice and piano	Joan Elwes	Sally Holmes	Keith Prowse
	1930	"XTC"	song	voice and piano	—	Edward Elgar	
	1930	Soliloquy	chamber	oboe and piano	—	—	
	1931	Nursery Suite	orchestral	1. Aubade (Awake); 2. The Serious Doll; 3. Busy-ness; 4. The Sad Doll; 5. The Wagon (Passes); 6. The Merry Doll; 7. Dreaming – Envoy (coda)	Their Royal Highnesses the Duchess of York and the Princesses Elizabeth and Margaret Rose	—	Keith Prowse
	1932	Queen Alexandra's Memorial Ode	choral	"So many true Princesses who have gone", SATB and orchestra or military band	In Memory H.M. Queen Alexandra	John Masefield	MS
	1932	"The Woodland Stream"	song	unison song	Stephen S. Moore	Charles Mackay	Keith Prowse
	1932	"The Rapid Stream"	song	unison song	Stephen S. Moore, Worcester	Charles Mackay	Keith Prowse
	1932	"When Swallows Fly"	song	unison song	Stephen S. Moore	Charles Mackay	Keith Prowse
	1932	Sonatina	keyboard	piano, certainly written many years earlier	May Grafton	—	Keith Prowse
	1932	Adieu	keyboard	piano, certainly written many years earlier, transcribed for violin by Szigeti	—	—	Keith Prowse
	1932	Serenade	keyboard	piano, certainly written many years earlier	John Austin	—	Keith Prowse
	1933	Mina	orchestral	small orchestra	—	—	Keith Prowse
	1933	"Tarantella"	song	baritone and orchestra, incomplete	—	Hilaire Belloc	—
	1933	Funeral March (Chopin)	arrangement	transcription for orchestra of the Funeral March from the Piano Sonata No. 2 in B♭ minor Op. 35	—	—	Keith Prowse
	1879	Adagio Solenne	—	see Five Intermezzos of Wind Quintets, Op 6.1, also used in Cantique, Op. 3	—	—	—
	1879	Evesham Andante	—	see Andante con Variazioni of Wind Quintets, Op. 6.5	—	—	—
	1879	Mrs Winslow's soothing syrup	—	see Adagio Cantabile of Wind Quintets, Op. 6.6	—	—	—
	1892	"Stars of the Summer Night"	—	see "Spanish Serenade", Op. 23	—	—	—
	1884	Une Idylle	—	see Idylle, Op. 4.1	—	—	—
	1894	King Olaf	—	see Scenes From The Saga Of King Olaf, Op. 30	—	—	—
	1896	Lux Christi	—	see The Light of Life, Op. 29	—	—	—
34.1	1897	Te Deum Laudamus	—	seeTe Deum and Benedictus, Op.34	—	Hymn	—
34.2	1897	Benedictus	—	seeTe Deum and Benedictus, Op.34	—	Benedictus (Song of Zechariah)	—
	1899	Enigma Variations	—	see Variations on an Original Theme (Enigma), Op. 36	—	—	—
	1902	Enfants d'un Rêve	—	see Dream Children, Op. 43	—	—	—
	1911	Coronation Offertorium	—	see "O Hearken Thou", Op. 64	—	—	—
	1911	"Intende voci orationis meæ"	—	see "O Hearken Thou", Op. 64	—	—	—
	1915	"When the spring comes round"	—	see "Quand nos bourgeons se rouvriront"	—	—	—
	1915	"A voice in the desert"	—	see "Une voix dans le désert", Op. 77	—	—	—
	1916	The Belgian Flag	—	see Le drapeau belge, Op. 79	—	—	—
	1932	"So many true Princesses who have gone"	—	see Queen Alexandra's Memorial Ode, 1932	—	—	—

== Notes ==
=== References ===
- Kennedy, Michael (1987). Portrait of Elgar (3rd ed.). Oxford: Clarendon Press. ISBN 0-19-284017-7.
- McVeagh, Diana M. (2007). Elgar the Music Maker. Woodbridge, Suffolk: Boydell Press. ISBN 978-1-84383-295-9.
- Moore, Jerrold N. (1984). Edward Elgar: A Creative Life. Oxford: Oxford University Press. ISBN 0-19-315447-1.
- Porte, J. F. (1921). Sir Edward Elgar. London: Kegan Paul, Trench, Turner & Co. Ltd.
- Young, Percy M. (1973). Elgar O. M.: A Study of a Musician. London: Collins. OCLC 869820.
