= Op. 59 =

In music, Op. 59 stands for Opus number 59. Compositions that are assigned this number include:

- Beethoven – String Quartets Nos. 7–9, Op. 59 – Rasumovsky
- Chopin – Mazurkas, Op. 59
- Dvořák – Legends
- Elgar – Oh, soft was the song, Was it some Golden Star?, and Twilight
- Mendelssohn – Sechs Lieder, Op. 59
- Nielsen – Tre Klaverstykker
- Schubert – Du bist die Ruh'
- Schumann – 4 Gesänge
- Scriabin – Prelude, Op. 59, No. 2
- Sibelius – In memoriam, funeral march for orchestra (1909, revised 1910)
- Strauss – Der Rosenkavalier
- Szymanowski – Litany to the Virgin Mary
