= Inside the Bar =

1917 song by Edward Elgar

”Inside the Bar" is a song written in 1917 by the English composer Edward Elgar, with words by Sir Gilbert Parker.

It was published by Enoch & Sons in 1917.

In its original version it is a part-song for four baritones with a piano part marked accompaniment ad lib., but it was also arranged by the composer as a song for solo voice with piano accompaniment, and for a group of two tenors and two basses.

It is sub-titled A Sailor's Song, and dedicated to the singers Charles Mott, Harry Barratt, Frederick Henry and Frederick Stewart, following their successful performances of Elgar's The Fringes of the Fleet. It was first performed at the Coliseum Theatre in London, on 25 June 1917. The song was added to The Fringes of the Fleet songs for the provincial tour of that year, with Charles Parker replacing Charles Mott who had been called upon to serve in the army.

It tells the story of a sailor's longing for a safe harbour and his girl. Notably, with its juxtaposition to the Fringes of the Fleet songs, it makes no reference to the wartime role of sailor or ship.

The song's first dedicatee, Charles Mott, was killed on 22 May 1918 in the World War I action in France.

Three other poems by Parker: Oh, soft was the song, Twilight and Was it some Golden Star?, from the same book of poems called Embers, had earlier been set to music by Elgar as part of his Op. 59 song-cycle in 1910.

== Lyrics ==
I knows a town, an' it's a fine town,

An' many a brig goes sailin' to its quay;

Yo-ho.

I knows an inn, an' it's a fine inn,

An' a lass that's fair to see.

I knows a town, an' it's a fine town;

I knows an inn, an' it's a fine inn -

But O my lass, an' O the gay gown

Which I have seen my pretty in!

I knows a port, an' it's a fine port,

An' many a brig is ridin' easy there;

Yo-ho.

I knows a home, an' it's a good home,

An' a lass that's sweet and fair.

I knows a port, an' it's a good port;

I knows a home, an' it's a good home -

But O the pretty that is my sort

What's wearyin' till I come!

I knows a day, an' it's a fine day,

The day a sailorman comes back to town;

Yo-ho.

I knows a tide, an' it's a good tide,

The tide that gets you quick to anchors down.

I knows a day, an' it's a fine day;

I knows a tide, an' it's a good tide -

An' Lord help the lubber, I say,

What's stole the sailorman's bride.

Yo-ho!

== Recordings ==
- Elgar: War Music Paul Kenyon, Stephen Godward, Simon Theobald, Russell Watson (baritones)
- Roderick Williams, Nicholas Lester, Laurence Meikle and Duncan Rock/Guildford Philharmonic/Tom Higgins: Somm SOMMCD243 Includes "Inside the Bar"
