= Seven Lieder (Elgar) =

1907 cover

Seven Lieder is a set of songs by the English composer Edward Elgar published together in 1907, by Ascherberg, Hopwood & Crew Ltd.

The set was published with German words 'by Ed. Sachs', though a wartime reprint of the songs published it as Edward Elgar's Album of Seven Songs with only the English words.

It was also published in different keys, for 'high' and 'low' voice.

== Songs ==
The songs are, with author of words, opus number (if any) and date of first publication:

1. "Like to the Damask Rose", Simon Wastell (1892)
2. "Queen Mary's Song", Alfred, Lord Tennyson (1889)
3. "A Song of Autumn", Adam Lindsay Gordon (1892)
4. "The Poet's Life", Ellen Burroughs (1892)
5. "Through the Long Days", John Hay, Op. 16, No. 2 (1885)
6. "Rondel", Henry Longfellow from a rondel by Froissart, Op. 16, No. 3 (1894)
7. "The Shepherd's Song", Barry Pain, Op. 16 No. 1 (1892)

== Recordings ==
- Songs and Piano Music by Edward Elgar performed by Amanda Pitt (soprano), Mark Wilde (tenor), Peter Savidge (baritone) with David Owen Norris (on Elgar's 1844 Broadwood square piano).
