= Sevillana (Elgar) =

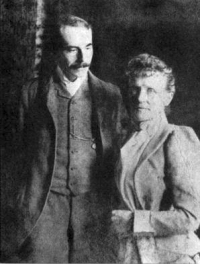
Edward and Alice Elgar, c. 1891

Sevillana, or, as the composer titled it Sevillaña (Scène Espagnole), is a short piece for orchestra by the English composer Edward Elgar written in 1884 and published as his Op. 7. It was first published by Tuckwood, with the composer's revision of 1889 published by Ascherberg in 1895. It was dedicated to W. C. Stockley, conductor of the Birmingham Festival.

Elgar's violin teacher, Adolf Pollitzer showed the score to the conductor August Manns who included it in a Crystal Palace concert on 12 May 1884. This was shortly after its first performance, on 1 May, at a Worcester Philharmonic Society concert conducted by the organist of Worcester Cathedral, William Done.

The piece was composed when he was a young man of 26, shortly after the break-up of his engagement to Miss Helen Weaver.

== Instrumentation ==
2 flutes (second also piccolo), 2 oboes, 2 clarinets, 2 bassoons, 2 horns, 2 cornets, 2 trombones, bass trombone, tuba, percussions (snare drum, tambourine, bass drum, cymbals, triangle) and strings.

== Structure ==
Allegro moderato 3/8 G minor

The work commences with a rhythmic lively 3/8 episode, characteristic of the Spanish Sevillana dance. After the brief introduction, violins expose the subject shown in excerpt 1.

Excerpt 1

Codetta dominated by dotted rhythm is followed by refined melody in G major (Excerpt 2).

Excerpt 2

Subsequently, cheerful episode is shown in D major (Excerpt 3).

Excerpt 3

After the short development using excerpts 2 and 3, dotted rhythm reappears, followed by recapitulation of excerpt 1. In the coda, the music accelerates to con fuoco of excerpt 2, then to presto of excerpt 1, and it rushes into the end.

Average performance of this work requires approximately 5 minutes.
