= Sabbath Morning at Sea =

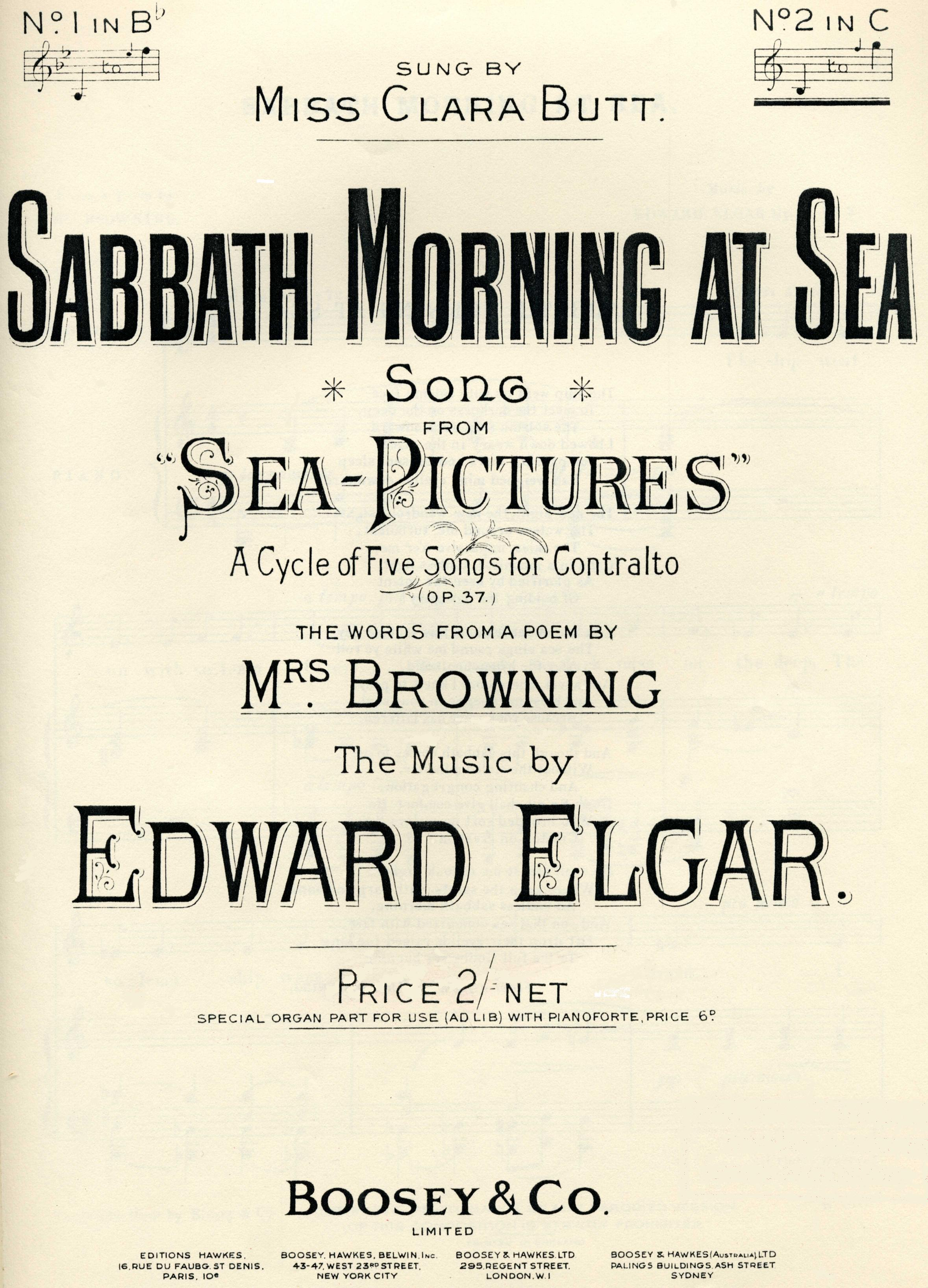

"Sabbath Morning at Sea" is a poem by Elizabeth Barrett Browning first published in 1839, which Edward Elgar set to music in 1899 as the third song in his song-cycle Sea Pictures.

== Poem ==
The ship went on with solemn face:
To meet the darkness on the deep.
The solemn ship went onward.
I bowed down weary in the place;
For parting tears and present sleep
Had weighed mine eyelids downward.

The new sight, the new wondrous sight!
The waters round me, turbulent,
The skies, impassive o'er me,
Calm in a moonless, sunless light,
[As] glorified by [even the] intent
Of holding the day-glory!

Love me, sweet friends, this Sabbath day,
The sea sings round me while ye roll
Afar the hymn unaltered,
And kneel, where once I knelt to pray,
And bless me deeper in your soul,
Because your voice has faltered.

And though this Sabbath comes to me
Without the stolèd minister,
Or chanting congregation,
God's Spirit [shall give comfort], He
Who brooded soft on waters drear,
Creator on creation.

[He shall assist me to look] higher,
Where keep the saints with harp and song
An endless Sabbath morning,
And on that sea commixed with fire
Oft drop their eyelids raised too long
To the full Godhead's burning.

— Stanzas I, III, XI, XII, and XIII

== Elgar's setting ==
The opening reintroduces the oceanic theme from Sea Slumber Song. Several lines in the last stanza are repeated. At "And on that sea commixed with fire" the opening bars of the song cycle are quoted.
