= The Heart of Canada =

"The Heart of Canada" is a poem written by Alfred Noyes, and set to music by the English composer Edward Elgar. It was one of the songs (collectively known as the "Pageant of Empire") written to be performed in the Pageant of Empire at the British Empire Exhibition at Wembley Park on 21 July 1924.

The song refers to Canada as a member of the British Empire "Queen of the West...". It is a solo song of two verses, with a choral refrain "Canada! Fair young Canada!".

== Bibliography ==
- Foreman, Lewis (ed.),"Oh, My Horses! Elgar and the Great War", Elgar Editions, Rickmansworth, 2001 ISBN 0-9537082-3-3
- Richards, Jeffrey "Imperialism and Music: Britain 1876-1953" (Manchester University Press, 2002) ISBN 0-7190-4506-1
