= Diarmuid and Grania =

Play by W. B. Yeats and George Moore

Diarmuid and Grania is a play in poetic prose co-written by George Moore and W. B. Yeats in 1901, with incidental music by the English composer Edward Elgar.

== Play ==
George Moore wrote a novel based on a translation by Lady Gregory of the Fenian tale The Pursuit of Diarmuid and Gráinne. W. B. Yeats then collaborated with Moore in writing the play.

The play, in three acts, was dedicated to Henry Wood, and its first performance was by Frank Benson's English Shakespearean Company at the Gaiety Theatre, Dublin on 21 October 1901; it appeared in a double bill, being followed by Douglas Hyde's Casadh an tSugáin (The Twisting of the Hay Rope) performed by Irish-speaking amateurs supplied by the Gaelic League (the first Irish-language play ever seen on a regular stage). The part of Diarmuid was played by Benson, Grania by his wife Constance, and Laban by Lucy Franklein.

Although the collaboration had been difficult – Yeats and Moore disagreed frequently, mainly about style, and there was therefore no final version for publication – the production was well received. There was also controversy because the Irish characters were played by English actors. After the play was produced, Yeats, whose commitment had occasionally seemed to waver, defended it against all criticism.

== Music ==
At the late stages of composition, the authors decided to add songs, and Edward Elgar provided the music. The music that Elgar wrote for the play forms his Opus 42, which he published under the anglicised title Grania and Diarmid. It consists of only two pieces: an Introduction and Funeral March for orchestra, and a song for contralto soloist "There are seven that pull the thread".

Moore had initially asked Henry Wood if he could write music for the play, but Wood then recommended Elgar to him; though Moore had in any case been considering Elgar for the job. Moore had ambitions for Elgar to write him an opera, but initially asked him to start with the music in the third act, for the death of Diarmuid "..when words can go no further and then I would like music to take up the emotion...". Elgar was enthusiastic, and before even reading the play wrote the lengthy, slow Funeral March. Later he added the Introduction with its mysterious horn calls, and a song in the death scene for the Druidess Laban to sing at her spinning-wheel.

The Funeral March received its first separate performance in the Queen's Hall, London on 18 January 1902, conducted by Henry Wood. Its fine quality has been compared to the Pomp and Circumstance Marches, and it preceded the first march.

== Recordings ==
There are many recordings available of the Funeral March.

- Incidental Music and Funeral March Sir Adrian Boult, London Philharmonic Orchestra, BBCL 41702
- "There are seven that pull the thread" in Elgar: Complete Songs for Voice & Piano, Amanda Roocroft (soprano), Reinild Mees (piano)

== Notes and references ==
=== References ===
- Kennedy, Michael (1987). Portrait of Elgar (Third ed.). Oxford University Press. ISBN 0-19-284017-7.
- Mays, J. C. C. (ed.), Diarmuid and Grania: Manuscript Materials, Cornell University Press, 2005. ISBN 978-0-8014-4361-9
- Moore, Jerrold Northrop (1984). Edward Elgar: A Creative Life. Oxford University Press. ISBN 0-19-315447-1.
