= There are seven that pull the thread =

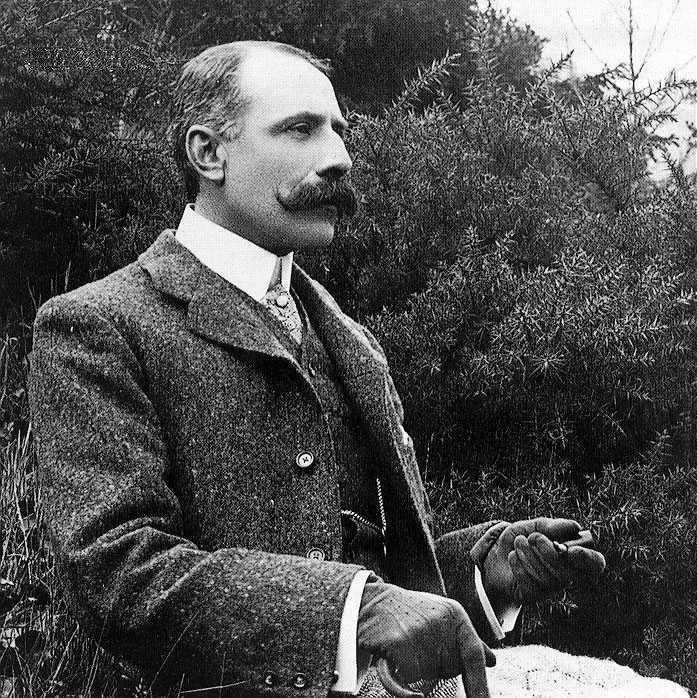
Edward Elgar, c. 1900

"There are seven that pull the thread" is a song with words by W. B. Yeats, and music written by the English composer Edward Elgar in 1901. The song is from Act I of a play Grania and Diarmid co-written in poetic prose by Yeats and the Irish novelist George Moore. This song and the incidental music that Elgar wrote for the play form his Op. 42.

The play was dedicated to Henry Wood and its first performance was at the Gaiety Theatre, Dublin in October 1901.

The tiny song is for one of the characters, Laban, to sing in her spinning-wheel. Elgar accompanies Yeats' prose with delicate and imaginative orchestration: he employs muted strings, a harp, flute, clarinet, bassoon and a pair of horns. The song is unhurried and delicate, in little recitative-like sections. The dynamic indicated is little more than a soft pianissimo.

== Lyrics ==
There are seven that pull the thread.
There is one under the waves,
There is one where the winds are wove,
There is one in the old grey house
Where the dew is made before dawn.

One lives in the house of the sun,
And one in the house of the moon,
And one lies under the boughs of the golden apple tree,
And one spinner is lost.

Holiest, holiest seven
Put all your pow'r on the thread
That I've spun in the house tonight.

== Recordings ==
- Elgar: Complete Songs for Voice & Piano Amanda Roocroft (soprano), Reinild Mees (piano)
