= Duett for trombone and double bass =

Musical work by Edward Elgar

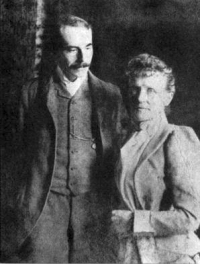
Edward and Alice Elgar, c. 1891

Duett for trombone and double bass is a musical work by the English composer Edward Elgar.

The duet was composed as wedding gift to Frank Weaver, a brother of Helen Weaver to whom the composer had been engaged some four years earlier, and presented to him on 1 August 1887 when he married Fannie Jones. Weaver was about a year older than Elgar; he was a shoemaker and an amateur double bass player, and Elgar played the trombone. Frank and Helen Weaver were among the children of William Weaver, a shoe merchant whose shop was in Worcester High Street, opposite Elgar's father's music shop.

The manuscript was inherited by one of Frank Weaver's sons, and was eventually published by Rodney Slatford (Yorke Edition) in 1970.

== Description ==
The duet is an Allegretto of length 49 bars. It is in the form of a fugue in which the subject is first played by the double bass then imitated by the trombone a fourth higher.
