= The Chariots of the Lord =

Poem by John Brownlie

"The Chariots of the Lord" is a poem by Rev. John Brownlie, D.D., set to music by Edward Elgar in 1914.

The song was written for Clara Butt and first performed by her in the Royal Albert Hall on 28 June 1914. It was published by Boosey & Co.

== Lyrics ==
THE CHARIOTS OF THE LORD

The chariots of the Lord are strong,

Their number passeth ken;

Mount them and fight against the wrong,

Ye who are valiant men.

Where, unabashed, the power of sin

Vaunts an unhindered sway,

Ride, in the strength of God, and win

Fresh laurels in the fray.

Where hands are weak, and hearts are faint,

Through conflict sharp and sore;

Where hearts that murmur no complaint,

Shrink at the thought of more :

There let the power of God be shown,

To quell satanic might;

To rescue those who strive alone,

Despondent in the flight.

For freedom wield the sword of might,

And cut the hands that bind;

Strike boldly in the name of right,

And still fresh laurels find.

Where unabashed, the power of sin

Vaunts an unhindered sway,

Ride, in the strength of God, and win

Fresh laurels in the fray.

== Recordings ==
- "The Unknown Elgar" includes "The Chariots of the Lord" performed by Stephen Holloway (bass), with Barry Collett (piano).
