= Always and Everywhere =

"Always and Everywhere" is a song by the English composer Edward Elgar with words translated from the Polish of Zygmunt Krasiński's poem "Zawsze i wszędzie" by Frank H. Fortey. It was composed and published in 1901.

The repeated ”Always and Everywhere” would have reminded the composer that the initials were those of his wife (Alice) and himself.

== Lyrics ==
O say not, when my earthly days are o'er,
That I have only caused thee sorrows sore;
For I have wrecked my own life, even more,
Always and Everywhere.

O say not, when on earth I no more dwell,
That I have numbed thy young heart’s joyous swell;
I, too, have quaffed the Poison-Cup of Hell,
Always and Everywhere.

But say, when soft the grasses o'er me wave,
That God is kind to hide me in the grave;
For both my life and thine I did enslave,
Always and Everywhere.

But say, O say! when my last hours depart,
That my poor life was one long frenzied smart;
For I have loved thee, though with bitter heart,
Always and Everywhere.

== Recordings ==
- "The Unknown Elgar" includes "Always and Everywhere" performed by Teresa Cahill (soprano), with Barry Collett (piano).
- Elgar: Complete Songs for Voice & Piano Amanda Roocroft (soprano), Reinild Mees (piano)
