= A Song of Union =

"A Song of Union" is a poem written by Alfred Noyes, and set to music by the English composer Edward Elgar. It was one of the songs (also known as the "Pageant of Empire") written to be performed in the Pageant of Empire at the British Empire Exhibition on 21 July 1924, though this particular song was not performed at the Pageant.

This was the only one that the composer wrote as a part-song, though two others "Sailing Westward" and "The Immortal Legions" were later arranged as part-songs.

The song is in the form of a confident march, beginning with the symbolic "stars that wheel around the Sun" and finally celebrating the union of the realms of Empire with "Love binds all our hearts in one". Although some of the songs in "Pageant of Empire" were associated with particular countries, this song celebrates the union of the whole Empire, and has no particular reference to what was at that time the Union of South Africa.

The music is taken from the central section of Elgar's "Empire March", written for the same occasion.

== Recordings ==
- The CD with the book Oh, My Horses! Elgar and the Great War has many historical recordings, including A Song of Union in a 1975 recording by the Kensington Choir and Symphony Orchestra conducted by Leslie Head. The book includes the lyrics on pages 283-284
