= Through the Long Days =

1885 song by Edward Elgar

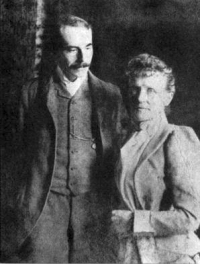
Edward and Alice Elgar, c. 1891

"Through the Long Days" is a song written by the English composer Edward Elgar in 1885 as No. 2 of his Op. 16, Three Songs. The words are from a poem by the American writer and statesman John Hay.

The song was composed when Elgar was on holiday at the home of his friend Dr. Charles Buck at Settle between 10 and 31 August 1885. It was in memory of a mutual friend, Jack Baguley, who had just died.

The song, together with "Like to the Damask Rose", was first performed by Charles Phillips at St James's Hall on 25 February 1897.

It was first published by Stanley Lucas (London) in 1887, dedicated to the Rev. E. Vine Hall. When he received the first copies from the publisher, Elgar inscribed one of them to his later wife, "Miss Roberts from Edward Elgar, March 21 1887". It was re-published by Ascherberg in 1890, then in 1907 as one of the Seven Lieder of Edward Elgar, with English and German words.

== Lyrics ==
German words by Ed. Sachs

Through the Long Days
Through the long days and years
What will my lov'd one be,
Parted from me?
Through the long days and years.

Always as then she was
Loveliest, brightest, best,
Blessing and blest,
Always as then she was.

Never on earth again
Shall I before her stand,
Touch lip or hand
Never on earth again.

But, while my darling lives,
Peaceful I journey on,
Not quite alone,
Not while my darling lives,
While my darling lives.

Tage und Jahre gehen
Tage und Jahre geh'n,
Wo wird mein Lieb wohl sein.
Fremd und allein?
Tage und Jahre geh'n.

Jedem ein Glück sie war,
Lieblich und gut und rein,
Wie Sonnenschein.
Jedem ein Glück sie war.

Nie mehr auf dieser Welt
Werde ich vor ihr steh'n,
In's Aug ihr seh'n.
Nie mehr auf dieser Welt.

Wandr' ich auch weit von hier,
Lebt doch ihr Bild allein
Im Herzen mein.
Lebt doch ihr Bild allein
In dem Herzen mein.

• Elgar expanded the original poem, which had just the first three lines of each verse.

== Recordings ==
- Songs and Piano Music by Edward Elgar has "Through the Long Days" performed by Mark Wilde (tenor), with David Owen Norris (piano).
- The Songs of Edward Elgar SOMM CD 220, Neil Mackie (tenor) with Malcolm Martineau (piano), at Southlands College, London, April 1999

== Notes ==
=== Sources ===
- Moore, Jerrold Northrop (1984). Edward Elgar: A Creative Life. Oxford University Press. ISBN 0-19-315447-1.
- Young, Percy M. (1956). Letters of Edward Elgar and Other Writings. London: Geoffrey Bles.
