= Pageant of Empire (Elgar) =

Songs by Edward Elgar

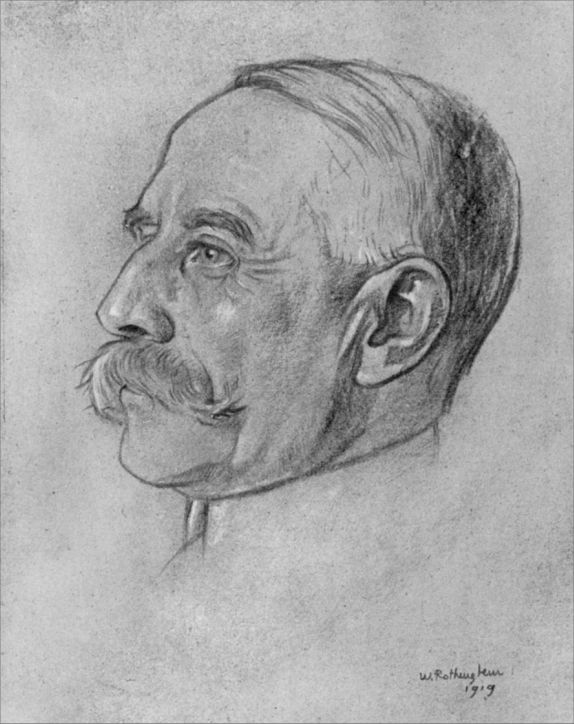
Edward Elgar in 1919, by William Rothenstein

Pageant of Empire is the title given to a set of songs, to words by Alfred Noyes, written by the English composer Sir Edward Elgar and given important positions in the Pageant of Empire at the British Empire Exhibition at Wembley Park.

== Details ==
The songs were first performed at the Pageant on 21 July 1924, when they were conducted by the composer.

The songs were published by Enoch & Sons. They are:

1. "Shakespeare's Kingdom"
2. "The Islands (A Song of New Zealand)"
3. "The Blue Mountains (A Song of Australia)"
4. "The Heart of Canada"
5. "Sailing Westward"
6. "Merchant Adventurers"
7. "The Immortal Legions"
8. "A Song of Union"

Nos. 1–7 are for solo singer with accompaniment.

No. 2 "The Islands", No. 5 "Sailing Westward", and three other poems by Noyes: "Indian Dawn", "The Cape of Good Hope" (for South Africa) and "Gloriana" (Queen Elizabeth I) were also arranged for chorus SATB and have the same musical accompaniment.

No. 7 "The Immortal Legions" was also arranged for chorus SATB.

No. 8 "A Song of Union" is a part-song for chorus SATB written for but not actually performed in the Pageant.

Three movements from Elgar's "The Crown of India" were included in the Pageant, representing "The Early Days of India": the Introduction, the March of the Mogul Emperors and the Crown of India March.

Elgar composed his Empire March for the same occasion, and it was at that time considered part of the Pageant of Empire. However the Empire March was not performed then and Elgar's Imperial March took its place.

The orchestral scores and parts for all the songs with the exception of "Immortal Legions" and the "March" have been lost, but they have been orchestrated by conductor Martin Yates and recorded complete on Dutton Epoch by Baritone Roderick Williams with the BBC Concert Orchestra conducted by Martin Yates.

== Recordings ==
- The CD with the book Oh, My Horses! Elgar and the Great War has many historical recordings including
  - The Immortal Legions, a 1975 recording with Anthony Ransome (baritone), Kensington Choir and Symphony Orchestra conducted by Leslie Head
  - A Song of Union, a 1975 recording by the Kensington Choir and Symphony Orchestra conducted by Leslie Head
- The CD "The Unknown Elgar" has Sailing Westward and The Immortal Legions, Tudor Choir directed by Barry Collett, with Ken Burley (piano) PEARL SHE CD 9635
- Elgar Pageant of Empire & Sea Pictures Roderick Williams (Baritone) BBC Concert Orchestra conducted by Martin Yates on Dutton Epoch
