= The Islands (Elgar) =

"The Islands" is a poem written by Alfred Noyes, and set to music by the English composer Edward Elgar. It was one of the songs (collectively known as the "Pageant of Empire") written to be performed in the Pageant of Empire at the British Empire Exhibition on 21 July 1924.

The song is subtitled "A Song of New Zealand". It describes in two verses the atmosphere of the islands and the ties with the motherland.

Elgar used the same music for four other songs in the set: "Sailing Westward", "Gloriana" (Queen Elizabeth I), "The Cape of Good Hope" (for South Africa) and "Indian Dawn".

This song was arranged by the composer as an accompanied part-song for SATB.
