= Romance for violin (Elgar) =

The Romance in E minor for violin and piano is a work by Edward Elgar composed in 1878 or 1879 and published in 1885 as his Opus 1.

The Romance was dedicated to Oswin Grainger, an older friend of Elgar's from a Worcester orchestra they played in, who was an amateur musician and grocer by trade. It was published by Schott's in 1885 and the first performance was on 20 October, in Worcester.

== Structure ==
Andante, 12/8, E minor

Following a four-bar introduction by the piano, the violin introduces the subject.

The same piano introduction then leads to the second subject in G minor, played by the violin.

The music reaches two passionate climaxes before the first theme reappears. Double stops in the violin lead to the quiet conclusion of the work.

It is a short piece, with a performance time of approximately five minutes.

== Recordings ==
- Elgar: Romance for Violin & Piano, Op. 1, Simone Lamsma (Violin), Yurie Miura (Piano)
- Elgar: Romance for Violin & Piano, Op. 1, Marat Bisengaliev (Violin), Benjamin Frith (Piano)
