= Idylle (Edgar) =

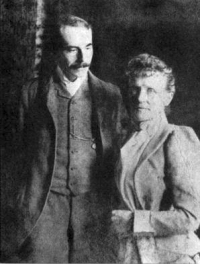
Edward and Alice Elgar, c. 1891

Idylle is a piece for violin and piano composed by Edward Elgar in 1884, as his Opus 4, No. 1. Appended to the title is the description Esquisse Facile, which means "Easy Sketch". It was Elgar's first published work.

It is dedicated to "Miss E. E., Inverness", and first published by Beare & Son in 1885. John Beare was the brother-in-law of Elgar's friend Dr. Charles Buck.

Elgar was a young unmarried man of 27 when he met the "Miss E. E." of the dedication whilst on holiday in Scotland in the summer of 1884. It is notable that she shared his initials. He recorded four meetings with her in a diary, but did not reveal her name: the first meeting was on a loch boat to Oban, and the final meeting was at Inverness, with flowers from him before a last adieu. The work was composed when he returned home from the holiday. It seems appropriate and may be significant that the music contains the Scotch snap rhythm at the end of the principal subject.

The work was later published by Ashdown in 1910.

== Arrangements ==
Idylle was arranged for orchestra by Henry Geehl.
