= Rosa Newmarch =

English poet and writer on music

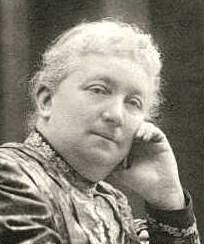
The English patron of the arts and musicologist, Rosa Newmarch

Rosa Harriet Newmarch (18 December 1857 – 9 April 1940) was an English poet and musicologist.

== Biography ==
Rosa Harriet Jeaffreson was born in Leamington in 1857, the maternal granddaughter of 19th-century dramatist James Kenney. She settled in London in 1880, when she began contributing articles to various literary journals. In 1883, she married Henry Charles Newmarch, thereafter using her married name in her professional work.

Beginning in 1897, she did a great deal of research on Russian music, making many visits to Russia and working at the Imperial Public Library of Saint Petersburg under the supervision of Vladimir Stassov. She became one of the first English critics to champion Russian music. After 1915 she performed a similar service for Slovak music.

From 1907 she edited the Living Masters of Music book series for John Lane.

From 1908 until 1920, she wrote programme notes for the New Queen's Hall Orchestra, and for Prom concerts. From 1919 she was assisted in respect of new works to the repertoire by Eric Blom, then in the early stages of his writing career. Newmarch's existing notes for established works continued to appear in the programmes. Newmarch and Blom continued to write in tandem until 1927, when the BBC took over the concerts.

Newmarch died in Worthing in 1940, aged 82. She was the great-grandmother of comedian Sara Pascoe.

== Legacy ==
On 26 October 2010, Newmarch was the subject of the 30-minute BBC Radio programme "Rosa and Leoš", narrated by Peter Avis. This described her role popularising the music of Leoš Janáček in Britain, and organising a visit to Britain by the composer.

== Books ==
- Tchaikovsky (1900)
- Horae Amoris (1903) (poetry)
- Henry J. Wood (1904)
- Songs to a Singer (1906) (poetry)
- The Life and Letters of Tchaikovsky (1908)
- César Franck (by Vincent d'Indy, as translator) (1910)
- Mary Wakefield: a memoir (1912, Kendal: Atkinson & Pollitt) online text
- The Russian Opera (1914)
- The Russian Arts (1917)
- Jean Sibelius (1939)
- The Music of Czechoslovakia (1942)
- The Concert-Goer's Library (six volumes, 1928–48). These are collections of her programme notes, arranged by musical form.
