= The Blue Mountains (song) =

Song composed by Edward Elgar

"The Blue Mountains" is a song by the English composer Edward Elgar, with lyrics from a poem written by Alfred Noyes. It was one of the songs (collectively known as the "Pageant of Empire") written to be performed in the Pageant of Empire at the British Empire Exhibition in Wembley Park, London, on 21 July 1924.

The song is subtitled "A Song of Australia". It refers to the Blue Mountains of New South Wales, Australia, and the pioneers who went westward to new lands beyond them.
