= Shakespeare's Kingdom =

1924 poem by Alfred Noyes set to music by Edward Elgar

"Shakespeare's Kingdom" is a poem written by Alfred Noyes and set to music by the English composer Edward Elgar. It was one of the songs (also known as the "Pageant of Empire") written to be performed in the Pageant of Empire at the British Empire Exhibition on 21 July 1924.

The song is about the English poet, William Shakespeare, describing his arrival in London.
