= Clapham Town End =

"Clapham Town End" is an old Yorkshire folk song which was harmonised by the English composer Edward Elgar in 1890.

Elgar arranged the song for his friend Dr. Charles W. Buck. It is for voice with piano accompaniment. The song is similar to the Somersetshire song "Richard of Taunton Dene".

== Lyrics ==
CLAPHAM TOWN END

At Clapham Town end lived an Old Yorkshire tyke
Who i dealing i horseflesh had ne'er met his like.
'Twas his pride that i aw the hard bargains he'd hit
He'd bit a good mony but nivver been bit.

Chorus: Wi' me dum a dum dary, *

Dum a dum dary,
Dum a dum dary,
Dum a dum day.

This old Tommy Tavers (by that name he was known)
Had an old carrion bit that was sheer skin and bone.
To have killed him for the curs would have been quite as well,
But 'twas Tommy's opinion he'd die off himsel',

Chorus

Well, one Abie Muggins, a neighbouring cheat,
Thought to diddle old Tommy would be a great treat;
He'd a horse, too, 'twas worse than old Tommy's, you see,
For tonight he'd thought that he would proper to dee.

Chorus

Thinks Abie: "Th' old codger'll never smoke the trick:
"I'll swap with him my poor dead horse for his quick,
"And if Tommy, I'm nobbered can happen to trap,
"'Twill be a fine feather in Abraham's cap."

Chorus

So to Tommy he goes, and to Tommy he pops:
"Between my horse and thine prithee Tommy would swaps.
"What will give me to boot, for mine th' better horse feel?"
"Not," says Tommy, "I'll swap even hands and ye will!"

Chorus

Abie preached a long time about something to boot,
Insisting that his was the liveliest brute.
But Tommy stuck fast where first had begun,
Till Abie shook hands and said: "Well, Tommy, done."

Chorus

"Oh, Tommy," says Abie, "I sorry for thee,
"I thought thou'd 'a had a more white in thy 'ee:
"Good luck in thy bargain, for my horse is dead."
"Hey," says Tommy, "me lad, so is mine, and it's flaid!"

Chorus

So Tommy got the better of the bargain of asked,
And came off with a Yorkshireman's triumph at last.
For though 'twixt dead horses there's not much to choose,
Yet Tommy was richer by the hide and four shoes.

Chorus

• Ambling of the mouldy steed (Elgar's remark on the score)
