= Mrs. Winslow's Soothing Syrup =

American patent medicine, created 1845

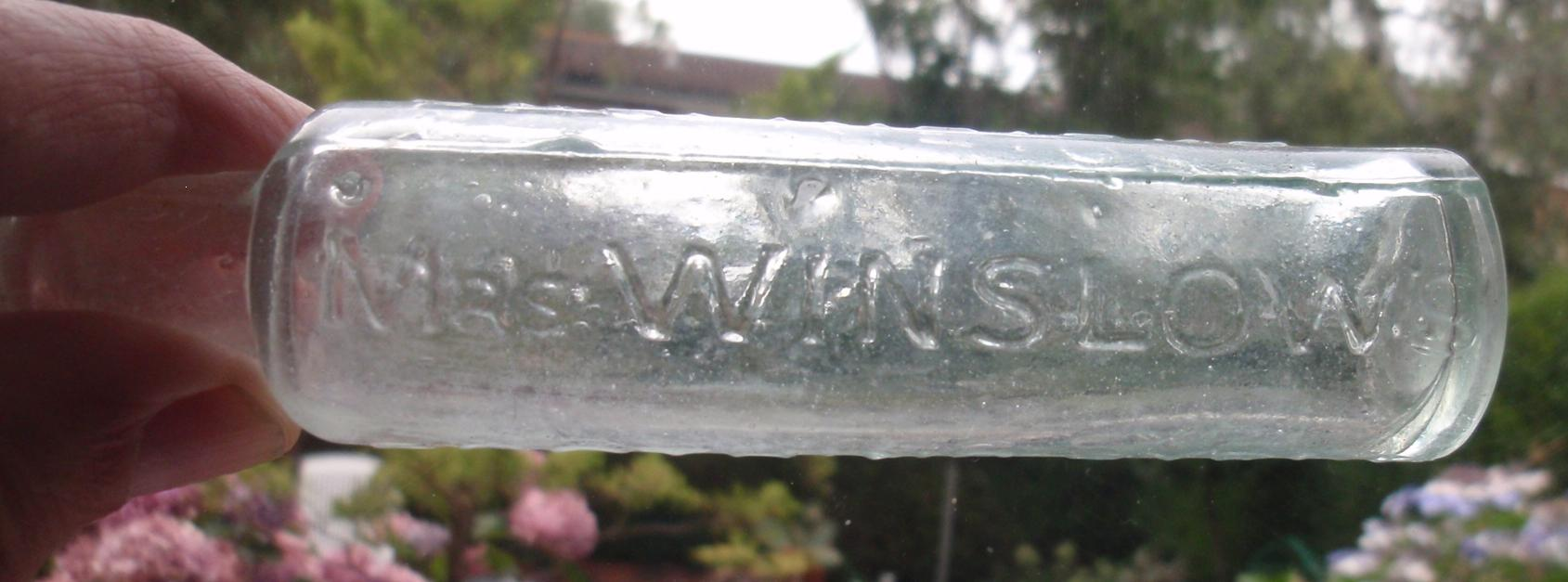
Moulded on the sides of this 5-inch tall glass bottle are the inscriptions MRS. WINSLOWS / SOOTHING SYRUP / CURTIS & PERKINS / PROPRIETORS

Mrs. Winslow's Soothing Syrup was a patent medicine supposedly compounded by Mrs. Charlotte N. Winslow, and first marketed by her son-in-law Jeremiah Curtis and Benjamin A. Perkins of Bangor, Maine, United States in 1845. The formula consisted of morphine sulphate (65 mg per fluid ounce), sodium carbonate, spirits foeniculi, and aqua ammonia but was changed several times. It was claimed that it was "likely to sooth any human or animal", and it effectively quieted restless infants and small children, especially for teething. It was widely marketed in the United Kingdom and the United States. As well as newspapers, the company used various media to promote its product, including recipe books, calendars, and trade cards. In its marketing, it claimed to relieve constipation, freshen breath, and clean teeth.

In 1911 the American Medical Association issued a publication titled "Nostrums And Quackery" in which, in a section called "Baby Killers", it incriminated Mrs. Winslow's Soothing Syrup. Nevertheless, the product was not withdrawn from sale until 1930.

In 1879 the English composer Edward Elgar wrote an early musical work, part of his Harmony Music for a wind quintet, which he titled Mrs. Winslow's soothing syrup.

In Woody Guthrie's 1940 song "Tom Joad" from the album Dust Bowl Ballads, Grandpa Joad is given soothing syrup before he dies.

== See also ==
- United States v. Johnson (1911)
