= Rondel (Elgar) =

1894 song by Edward Elgar

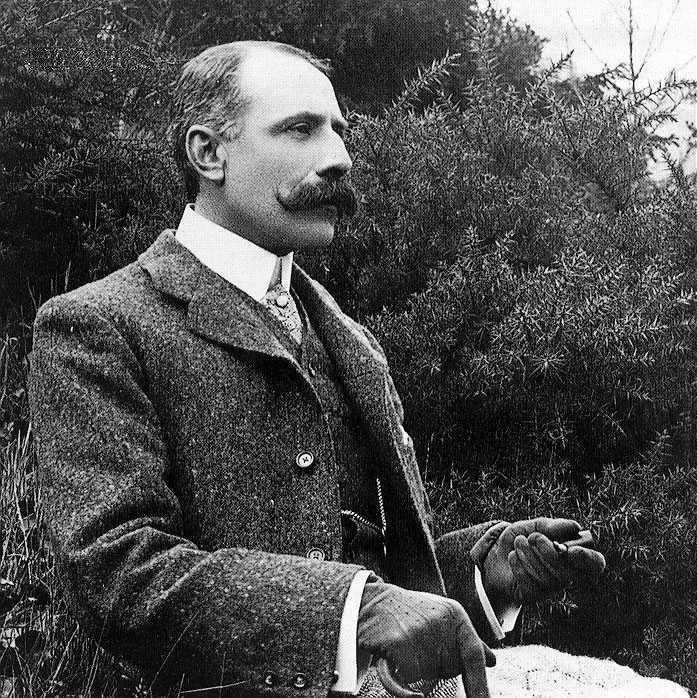
Edward Elgar, c. 1900

"Rondel" is a song written by the English composer Edward Elgar in 1894 as his Op. 16, No. 3. The words are by Longfellow, a translation of a Rondel by Froissart. The manuscript is dated 4 January 1894.

The song was first performed by Charles Phillips in St James's Hall on 7 December 1897.

The song was first published in 1896, by Ascherberg. It was re-published in 1907 as one of Elgar's Seven Lieder, with English and German words.

== Lyrics ==
Love, love, what wilt thou with this heart of mine?
Nought see I sure or fixed in thee! (Note: Elgar reversed the positions of "sure" and "fixed" in the second line.)
I do not know thee, – nor what deeds are thine:
Love, love, what wilt thou with this heart of mine?
Nought see I fixed or sure in thee!

Shall I be mute, or vows with prayers combine?
Ye who are blessed in loving, tell it me:
Love, love, what wilt thou with this heart of mine?
Nought see I fixed or sure in thee!

Lieb', Lieb', was willst du mit dem Herzen mein?
Nicht kenn' ich dich, noch dein Begehr!
Nichts scheint mir fest in dir, noch klar zu sein:
Lieb', was willst du mit dem Herzen mein?
Nicht kenn' ich dich, noch dein Begehr!

Bleibe ich stumm, soll liebevoll ich sein?
Ihr, die ihr liebt, lasst mich nicht zweifeln mehr:
Lieb', Lieb', was willst du mit dem Herzen mein?
Nicht kenn' ich standhaft dich, noch dein Begehr!

== Recordings ==
- "The Songs of Edward Elgar SOMM CD 220", Neil Mackie (tenor), Malcolm Martineau (piano), at Southlands College, London, April 1999
