= In Moonlight =

1904 song by English composer Edward Elgar

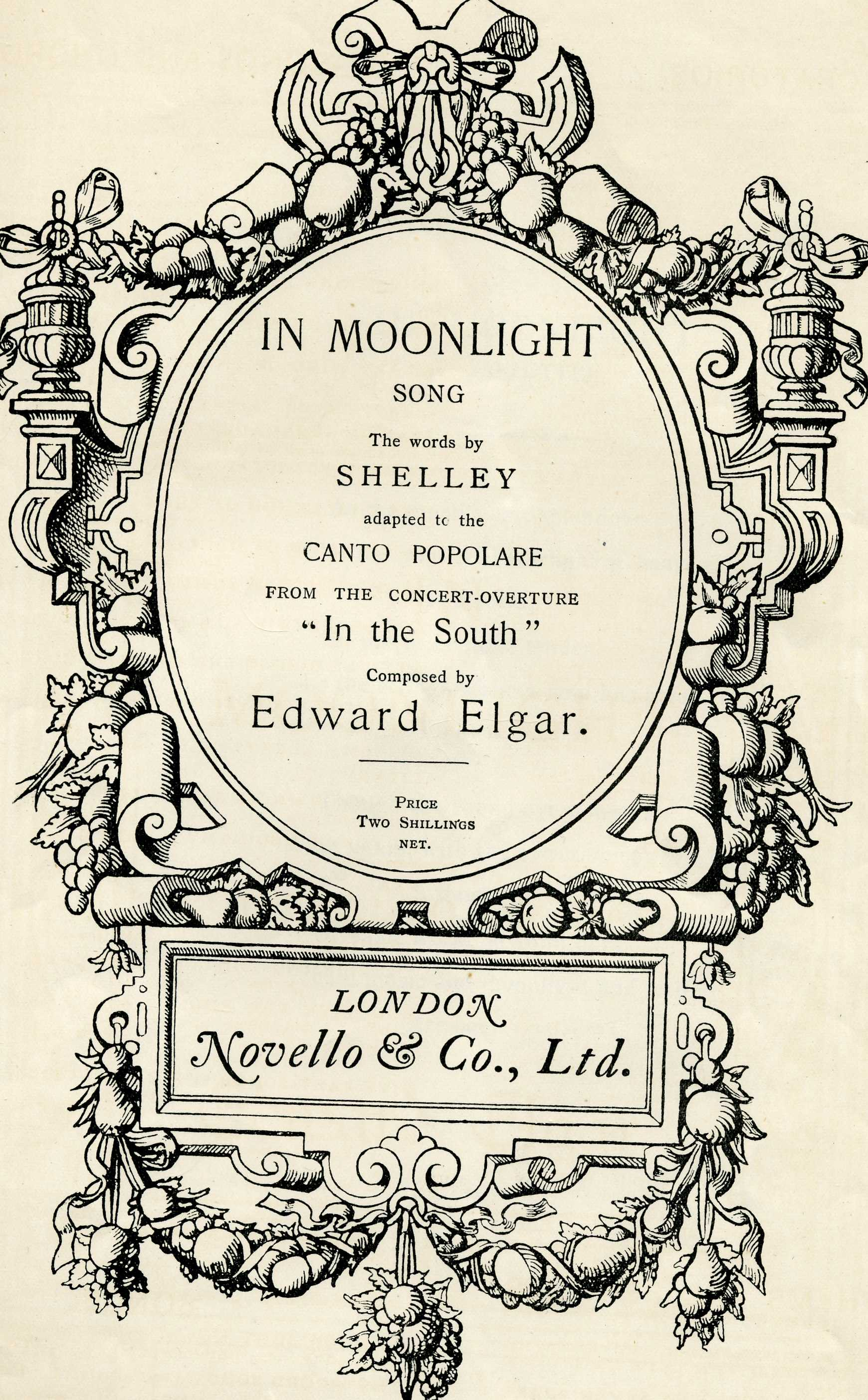

"In Moonlight" is a song with music written by the English composer Edward Elgar in 1904 to words from the poem "An Ariette for Music. To a Lady singing to her Accompaniment on the Guitar", by Percy Bysshe Shelley (1792–1822) and published in 1832.

The song is adapted to a central section of Elgar's concert-overture "In the South (Alassio)" where the "Canto Popolare" melody is introduced by a solo viola with a delicate and imaginative accompaniment, which could be likened to Shelley's "...accompaniment on the Guitar."

The first performance of "In the South" was in March 1904. In July that year Elgar made different versions of the "Canto Popolare" section. These were variously for small orchestra, for piano and for various instrumental combinations.

In August 1905 the song was reviewed in the London "Times":

"Sir Edward Elgar is paying one of the penalties of popularity, and the adaptation of a theme from his overture "In the South" to Shelley's words beginning "As the moon's soft splendour" will very likely attain the success which the publishers, Messrs. Novello & Co., appear to anticipate, as they issue it in several keys. The words, as might be expected, have to suffer a good deal of rhythmic modification in order to fit the "canto popolare", but this is hardly likely to stand in the way of the song's success".

The same poem was set by many others including the American composer Amy Beach ("Mrs. H. H. A. Beach"), as her Op. 1 No. 4, with the title "Ariette".

== Lyrics ==
Elgar used only the first and third stanzas of Shelley's poem, "An Ariette for Music".

IN MOONLIGHT (ARIETTE)

== Recordings ==
- "The Unknown Elgar" includes "In Moonlight" performed by Teresa Cahill (soprano), with Barry Collett (piano).
- Elgar: Complete Songs for Voice & Piano Amanda Roocroft (soprano), Reinild Mees (piano)
- Songs and Piano Music by Edward Elgar has "In Moonlight" performed by Amanda Pitt (soprano), with David Owen Norris (piano).
- The Songs of Edward Elgar SOMM CD 220 Catherine Wyn-Rogers (soprano) with Malcolm Martineau (piano), at Southlands College, London, April 1999

== Videos ==
- "In Moonlight" on YouTube (sound only) - Felicity Lott (soprano) with Graham Johnson (piano) 2008
