= The Poet's Life =

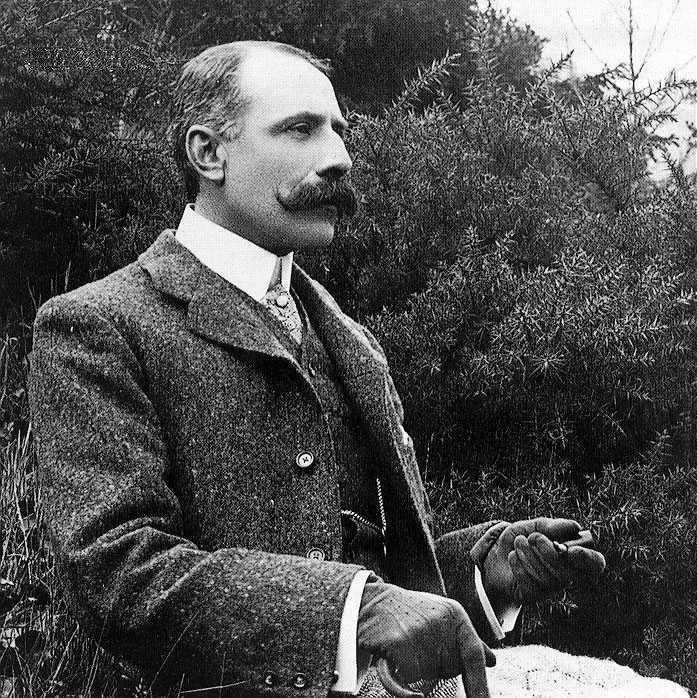
Edward Elgar, c. 1900

"The Poet's Life" is a song written by the English composer Edward Elgar in 1892, with words by "Ellen Burroughs". The manuscript of the song has a dedication to "Mrs. Fitton", but this is crossed out. The song was published in 1907 as one of the Seven Lieder of Edward Elgar, with English and German words.

== Lyrics ==
German words by Ed. Sachs.

English THE POET'S LIFE A poet sang, so light of heart was he,. . . There follow'd fame, and swiftly, swiftly there follow’d fame.	German DICHTERLEBEN Ein Dichter sang, die Weise klang so hell.. . . Und sein Nam' und Ruhm ist in jedem Mund.

NOTES

• There are about 20 lines of verse, of which only the first and last are shown.

• We believe this text to be copyright under U. S. copyright law. We will not display it until we obtain permission to do so or discover it is in the public domain.

== Recordings ==
- Songs and Piano Music by Edward Elgar has "The Poet's Life" performed by Mark Wilde (tenor), with David Owen Norris (piano).
- The Songs of Edward Elgar SOMM CD 220 Neil Mackie (tenor) with Malcolm Martineau (piano), at Southlands College, London, April 1999
