= Sursum corda (Elgar) =

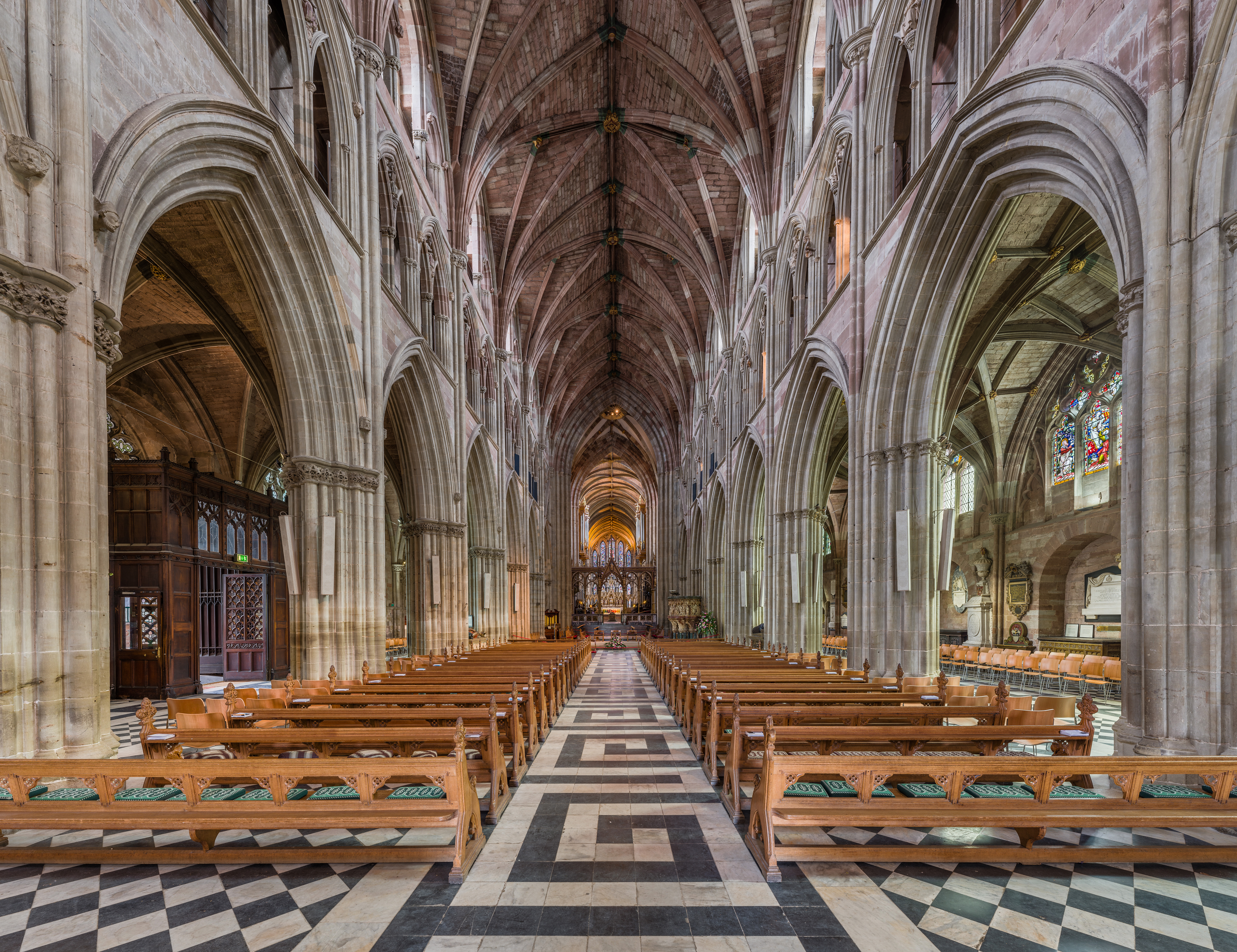
Nave of Worcester Cathedral

Sursum corda, Op. 11 is a musical work by the English composer Edward Elgar for strings, brass, timpani and organ, composed in 1894. The composer dedicated it to his friend Henry Dyke Acland (1850-1936), an amateur cellist who was his golfing companion, manager of the Worcester Old Bank in Malvern, and son of Henry Acland.

It was first performed at Worcester Cathedral on 9 April 1894, under the baton of Hugh Blair, organist of the cathedral. The composer was absent from this performance due to ill health. Its first London performance took place at a Queen's Hall Promenade Concert on 21 September 1901.

The title translates from the Latin to read, "Lift up your hearts".

== Instrumentation ==
The work is scored for 2 trumpets in B♭, 4 horns in F, 3 trombones, tuba, timpani, organ, and strings

== Structure ==
Adagio solenne, B♭ major, 2/4

The work begins with B♭ call of brass. Strings expose main subject shown in excerpt 1.

Excerpt 1

After the climax, the music calms down. A new material is provided in the dialogue between organ and strings following the B♭ call (Excerpt 2).

Excerpt 2

Second climax, developed from excerpt 2, is followed by reappearance of excerpt 1. Brass call indicates the end of the final climax, and coda, using excerpt 1 and other materials, concludes the work with satisfying sound of tutti.

Average performance of this work needs approximately 10 minutes.

== Transcriptions ==
The work has been transcribed for concert band by Bruce Houseknecht. This version was published in 1967 by Carl Fischer, Inc.
