= The Sweepers (poem) =

1917 poem written by Rudyard Kipling

Song
- Published: 1917
- Genre: Art song
- Length: 3:27
- Composer: Edward Elgar
- Lyricist: Rudyard Kipling

"The Sweepers" is a poem written by Rudyard Kipling (1865-1936), and set to music by the English composer Edward Elgar in 1917, as the fourth of a set of four war-related songs on nautical subjects for which he chose the title "The Fringes of the Fleet".

Like the others in the cycle, it is intended for four baritone voices: a solo and chorus. It was originally written with orchestral accompaniment, but was later published to be sung with piano accompaniment.

The poem was called by Kipling "Mine Sweepers", and is about the British ships called minesweepers which cleared the seas of enemy mines in World War I.

T. S. Eliot included the poem in his 1941 collection A Choice of Kipling's Verse.
