= Merchant Adventurers (Elgar) =

Song composed by Edward Elgar

"Merchant Adventurers" is a poem written by Alfred Noyes, and set to music by the English composer Edward Elgar. It was one of the songs (also known as the "Pageant of Empire") written to be performed in the Pageant of Empire at the British Empire Exhibition on 21 July 1924.

The song refers to the merchant adventurers who set sail from England in ships, to make their living in adventurous overseas trade. There are two verses, each with a refrain "...Glory, glory everlasting in the lordship of the sea" which may be sung by a chorus (SATB) of mixed voices.
