= Carissima (Elgar) =

"Carissima" is a piece for small orchestra by the English composer Sir Edward Elgar.

It was composed in December 1913 and published in 1914 by Elkin & Co.

It was the first work of Elgar's to be recorded, and the recording was its first performance. Landon Ronald persuaded Elgar to conduct the work for a recording by the Gramophone Company on 21 January 1914, so that a recording would be available when the piece was first played publicly. It was dedicated to Winifred Stephens "Mrs. Jeffrey Stephens", who was sister of the singer Muriel Foster and worked for the recording company. The first public performance was at a concert at the Royal Albert Hall on 15 February 1914, conducted by Landon Ronald.

Elgar arranged this work for piano solo.
