= The Sanguine Fan =

- Ballet score by Edward Elgar
- "A Fan in Sanguine" by Charles Conder
- Opus: 81

The Sanguine Fan, Op. 81, is a single-act ballet written by Edward Elgar in 1917. It was composed to raise money for wartime charities, and after two performances in 1917 and a recording of excerpts in 1920, the score was neglected until 1973, when the conductor Sir Adrian Boult revived it for a recording. It was later staged in the theatre by the London Festival Ballet.

== Background and first performance ==
Elgar's close friend and confidante, Alice Stuart-Wortley (Lady Stuart of Wortley) asked him to compose the music for a one-act ballet to be given at a fund-raising performance in aid of war charities in March 1917. Elgar agreed and wrote the music quickly: within a fortnight he had a complete short score and began the full orchestration.

Ina Lowther wrote the story of the ballet.

The scenario was by Ina Lowther (later the founder of the ballet course at the Royal College of Music). Her inspiration came from a decorative fan painted by Charles Conder using mostly the dark red colour sanguine used in heraldry. The fan depicted a glade with on one side the mythical figures of Echo and Pan and on the other mortals in 18th-century costume. Lowther devised a story in which the mortals dance among the trees before one of the men quarrels with his lover and, as they draw apart, he curses the god of love before becoming fascinated by Echo. Pan wakes, strikes the man dead and runs off into the trees with Echo, laughing sardonically as the dead man's lover kneels in grief over his body.

For the charity performance leading West End actors took the main roles: Gerald du Maurier played Pan and the two lovers were played by Fay Compton and Ernest Thesiger; Lowther played Echo. The first performance was part of the revue Chelsea on Tiptoe at the Chelsea Palace Theatre, London on 20 March 1917, and was conducted by the composer. Afterwards he added a further number, a shepherd's dance, which received its premiere at a second charity performance in May.

== Music ==
The score, which plays for a little under 20 minutes, is in nine continuous sections:

- Moderato–maestoso
- Andantino
- Piu moderato
- Allegro molto
- Grandioso
- Allegretto moderato
- Allegro
- Allegro
- Moderato

== Recordings ==
Elgar conducted parts of the score for an acoustic recording in 1920, and apart from the publication of a piano arrangement of a single number, "Echo's Dance", the work was thereafter neglected for more than fifty years. In 1973 Elgar's score was unearthed and the conductor Sir Adrian Boult agreed to record it for EMI with the London Philharmonic Orchestra. Further recordings followed, conducted by Bryden Thomson (1988), David Lloyd-Jones (1998) and John Wilson (2012).

== 1976 ballet ==
In September 1976, at the instigation of its director, Beryl Grey, the London Festival Ballet revived the score, with a new scenario and choreography by Ronald Hynd. It was set at an Edwardian soirée in Carlton House Terrace during which twin brothers become involved in a mix-up with two elegant ladies, one of whom suspects her sanguine-coloured fan has been stolen by the other. Some of the performances were conducted by Boult, whose last public appearance was conducting a performance on 24 June 1978.

== Sources ==
- Kennedy, Michael (1987). Adrian Boult. London: Hamish Hamilton. ISBN 978-0-33-348752-5.
- Moore, Jerrold Northrop (1984). Edward Elgar: A Creative Life. Oxford: Oxford University Press. ISBN 978-0-19-315447-6.
- Neil, Andrew (2012). "The Longed-for Light: Elgar's Music in Wartime". Elgar: The Longed-for Light. Thames Ditton: Somm. OCLC 815510766.
