= Like to the Damask Rose =

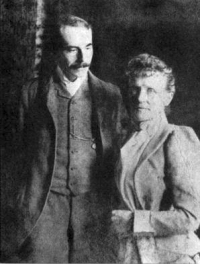
Edward and Alice Elgar, c. 1891

"Like to the Damask Rose" is a poem either by Francis Quarles called "Hos ego versiculos", or by Simon Wastell called “The flesh profiteth nothing”. It was set to music by the English composer Edward Elgar in 1892.

The song, together with Through the Long Days, was first performed by Charles Phillips in St. James's Hall on 25 February 1897.

It was first published (Tuckwood, Ascherberg) in 1893, and re-published by Boosey in 1907 as one of the Seven Lieder of Edward Elgar, with English and German words.

The 'damask rose' (Damascus rose) of the title is the common name of Rosa × damascena.

== Lyrics ==
Elgar made a few changes to the original words.

English - Elgar's lyrics LIKE TO THE DAMASK ROSE Like [to] the damask rose you see, Or like the blossom on [a] tree, Or like the dainty flow’r of May, Or like the morning [of] the day, Or like the sun, or like the shade, Or like the gourd which Jonas had, Even such is man, whose thread is spun, Drawn out, and cut, and so is done : The rose withers, the blossom blasteth, The flower fades, the morning hasteth, The sun sets, the shadow flies, The gourd consumes, [- the] man, he dies. Like to the grass that’s newly sprung, Or like a tale that’s new begun, Or like [a] bird that’s here to-day, Or like the pearled dew of May, Or like an hour, or like a span, Or like the singing of a swan, Even such is man, who lives by breath, Is here, now there, in life, and death : The grass withers, the tale is ended, The bird is flown, the dew’s ascended, The hour is short, the span not long, The swan’s near death, — man’s life is done.	German words by Ed. Sachs GLEICH WIE DER ROTEN ROSE PRACHT Gleich wie der roten Rose Pracht, Und gleich der Blüt' die am Zweige lacht, Gleich wie die Blume bei dem Hag, Gleich wie der Morgen von dem Tag, Gleich wie die Sonn', dem Schatten gleich, Und wie die Welle auf dem Teich: So, Mensch, bist du, dess Faden spann Der Parze Hand, dess Zeit verran. Die Rose stirbt, die Blüt' nicht weilet, Die Blume welkt, der Morgen eilet, Die Sonne sinkt, der Schatten flieht, Die Welle schmilzt, der Mensch vergeht. Gleich wie des Grasses neues Blatt, Der Tat gleich, die begonnen hat, Und gleich dem Vogel auf der Au, Dem Tropfen gleich Maientau, Der Spanne Zeit, der Stunde gleich, Des Schwanes Singen auf dem Teich: So, Mensch, bist du: dess Feuer sprüht Dess Feuer sinkt, bis es ver glüht. Das Gras ist welk, die Tat begangen, Der Vogel stumm, der Tau vergangen, Die Spann' ist kurz, die Stind' nicht lang, Der Schwan— er stirbt; Der Mensch vergeht!

== Recordings ==
- Songs and Piano Music by Edward Elgar has "Like to the Damask Rose" performed by Amanda Pitt (soprano), with David Owen Norris (piano).
- Elgar: Complete Songs for Voice & Piano Konrad Jarnot (baritone), Reinild Mees (piano)
- The Songs of Edward Elgar SOMM CD 220 Neil Mackie (tenor) with Malcolm Martineau (piano), at Southlands College, London, April 1999
