= The Shepherd's Song =

1892 song by Edward Elgar

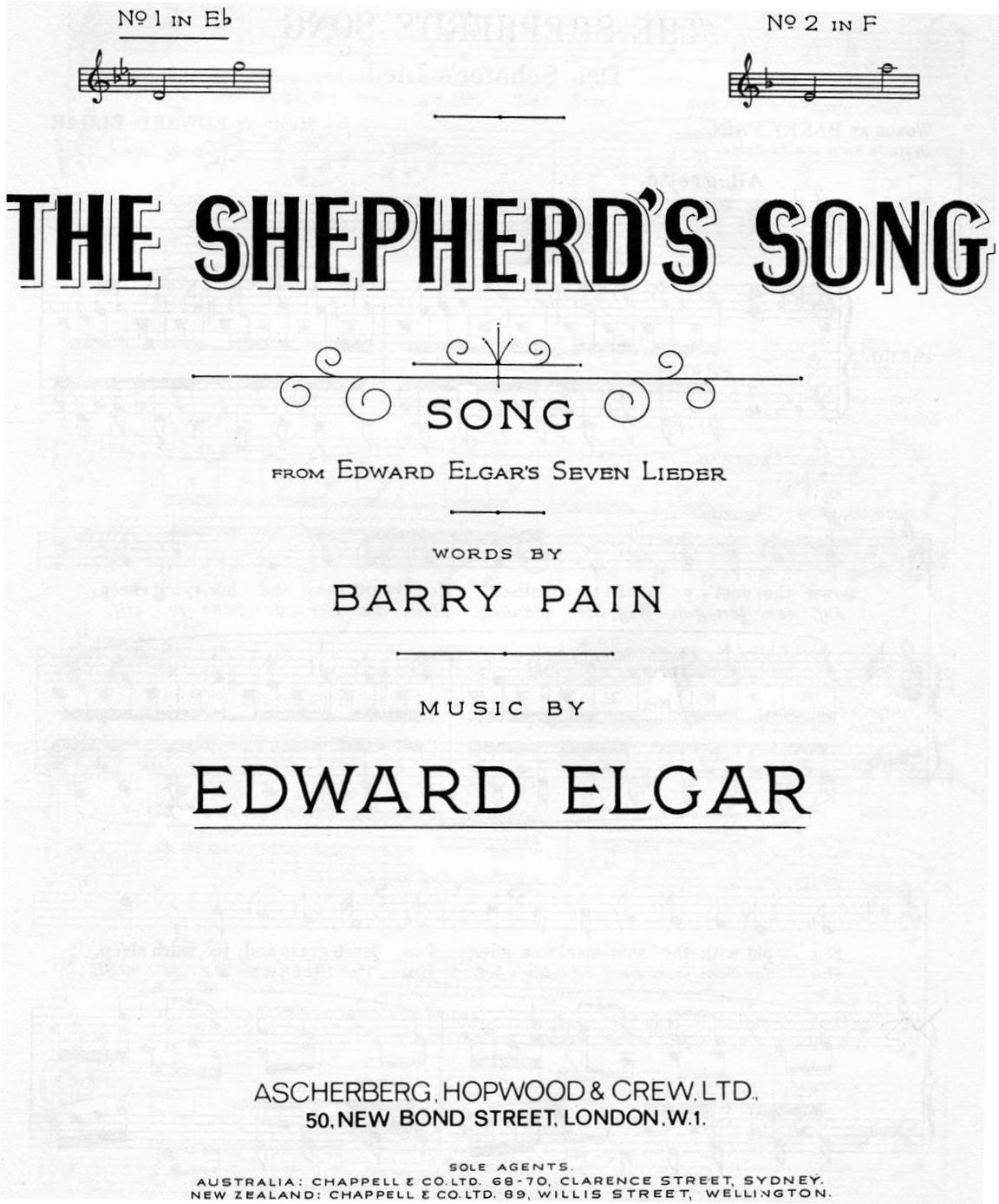

"The Shepherd's Song" is a song written by the English composer Edward Elgar in 1892. The words are by Barry Pain.

== History ==
The manuscript is dated 22 August 1892.

The song was first published in 1895 by Tuckwood as Elgar's Op. 16, No. 1, then in 1896 by Ascherberg. It was re-published in 1907 by Ascherberg, Hopwood & Crew, as the last of the Seven Lieder of Edward Elgar (with English and German words).

The song may be the same as that called "Muleteer's Song" for which permission was obtained from Barry Pain to use the words on 3 March 1894.

== Lyrics ==
German words by Ed. Sachs.

Down the dusty road together
Homeward pass the hurrying sheep,
Stupid with the summer weather,
Too much grass and too much sleep,
I, their shepherd, sing to thee
That summer is a joy to me.

Down the shore rolled waves all creamy
With the flecked surf yesternight;
I swam far out in starlight dreamy,
In moving waters cool and bright,
I, the shepherd, sing to thee
I love the strong life of the sea.

And upon the hillside growing
Where the fat sheep dozed in shade,
Bright red poppies I found blowing,
Drowsy, tall and loosely made,
I, the shepherd, sing to thee
How fair the bright red poppies be.

To the red-tiled homestead bending
Winds the road, so white and long
Day and work are near their ending
Sleep and dreams will end my song,
I, the shepherd, sing to thee;
In the dreamtime answer, answer me.

Auf dem langen Weg, der stäubet,
Heim die Herde Schafe eilt,
Von der Sommersonn' bestäubet,
Von der Weid', wo sie geweilt,
Ich, dein Schäfer, singe dir:
Der Sommer ist ein' Freude mir.

An das Ufer schlugen schäumend
Weissgekrönte Wellen an;
Ich schwann hinaus, die Nacht träumend,
Als sie sich über's Wasser spann;
Ich, dein Schäfer, singe dir:
Die See ist eine Freude mir.

Auf der blum'gen Bergeshalde,
Wo die Herde schlafend lag,
Fand ich bei dem Saum vom Walde
Rote Rosen an dem Hag;
Ich, dein Schäfer, singe dir:
Wie rot die Rosen leuchten mir.

Nach der trauten Hütte wendet
Sich der Weg, so lang und weiss,
Tag und Arbeit sind vollendet,
Bald naht sich der Schlummer leis',
Ich, dein Schäfer, singe dir:
In dem Traume träume, träum' von mir.

== Recordings ==
- Songs and Piano Music by Edward Elgar has "The Shepherd's Song" performed by Mark Wilde (tenor), with David Owen Norris (piano).
- The Songs of Edward Elgar SOMM CD 220 Catherine Wyn-Rogers (soprano) with Malcolm Martineau (piano), at Southlands College, London, April 1999
