= Sophie Jewett =

American poet

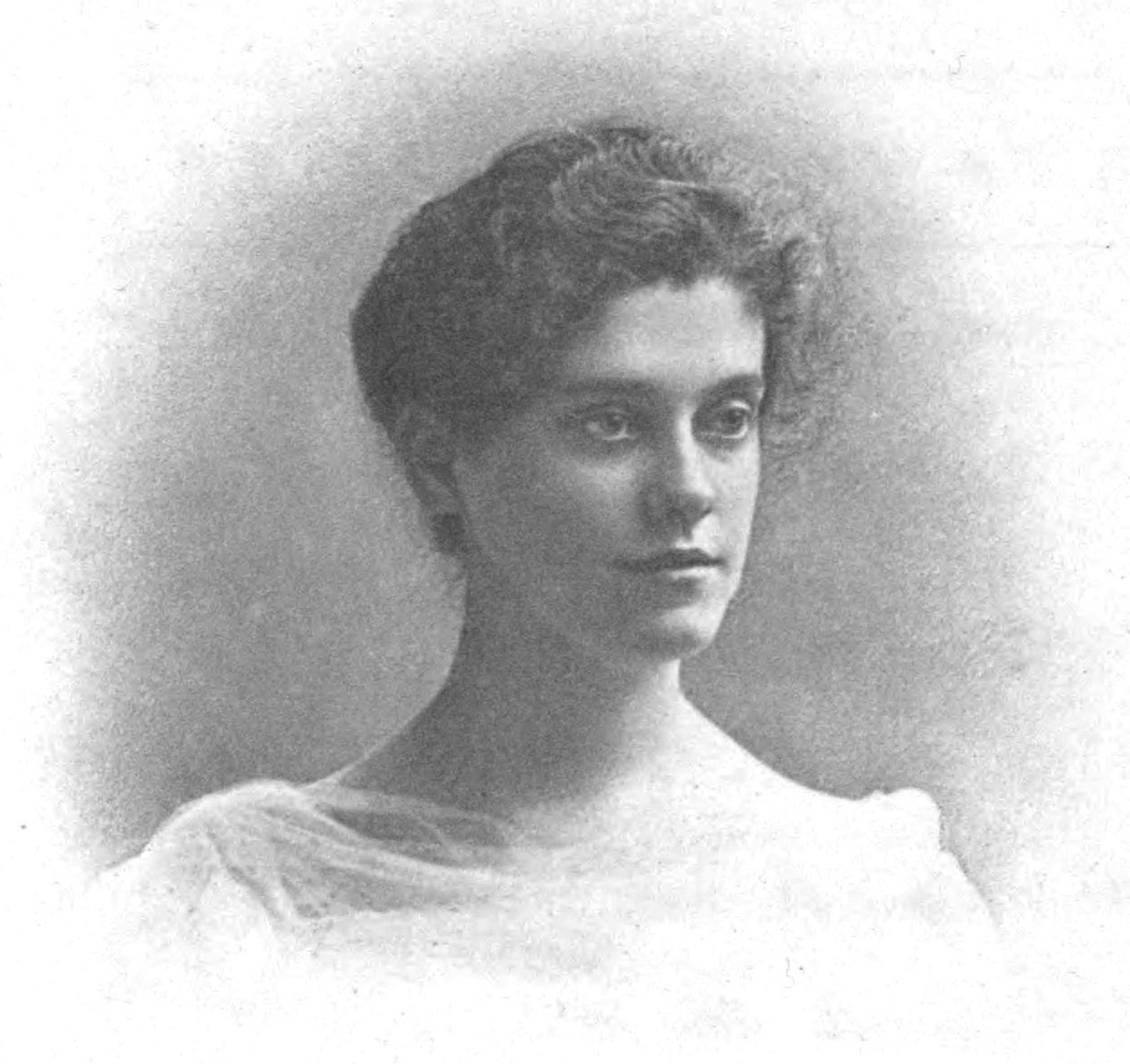
- Jewett in 1889
- Born: June 3, 1861; Moravia, New York
- Died: October 11, 1909 (aged 48)
- Occupations: Poet, translator, college professor
- Writing career
- Pen name: Ellen Burroughs
- Genre: Lyric poetry

Sophie Jewett (June 3, 1861 – October 11, 1909), also known under the pseudonym Ellen Burroughs, was an American lyric poet, translator, and professor at Wellesley College. Much of her poetry contains lesbian themes.

== Family ==
Jewett was born in Moravia, New York, one of four children of Charles Carroll Jewett, a doctor, and Ellen Ransom (Burroughs) Jewett. Her mother died when she was 7 and her father when she was 9, after which she was raised by an uncle, Daniel Burroughs, and her grandmother in Buffalo. Her sister Louise became a noted art historian. In Buffalo, she developed a friendship with Mary Whiton Calkins, the daughter of her minister, who also went on to teach at Wellesley College.

== Career ==
=== Writing ===
When she was 20, Jewett traveled in Europe, and reflections of these experiences appear in her early poetry and in sketches that she published in The Outlook and Scribner's Magazine.

Jewett initially published poetry under the pseudonym Ellen Burroughs (borrowed from her mother's name). Her first book under her own name was The Pilgrim, and Other Poems (1896). Jewett wrote in various poetic forms, including the rondeau, the sonnet, and the ballad. Fellow poet Richard Watson Gilder called her a true poet with a golden gift.

In addition to original poetry, Jewett undertook translations, including a version of the complex Middle English poem The Pearl in the original meter and selected lyrics such as a "Nativity Song" adapted from the work of Jacopone da Todi. A collection of southern European ballads translated by Jewett from several languages was edited by the author and literary scholar Katharine Lee Bates and published posthumously.

In 1901, Jewett published an introduction to a critical edition of Tennyson's The Holy Grail.

The English composer Edward Elgar wrote a song entitled "The Poet's Life" (1892) with lyrics by Jewett (credited to her pseudonym of Ellen Burroughs).

=== Teaching ===
In 1889, Jewett began teaching English at Wellesley College, and in 1897 she became an associate professor. Among her students there was the writer Sarah Bixby Smith.

== Death and legacy ==
Jewett died October 11, 1909. Wellesley College founded a scholarship in Jewett's name in 1911 and dedicated a window in her memory in the college chapel.

== Publications ==
Original poetry

- The Pilgrim, and Other Poems (1896)
- Persephone and Other Poems (1905)
- The Poems of Sophie Jewett (1910)

Translations

- The Pearl (1908)
- Folk-Ballads of Southern Europe (1913)

Children's books

- God's Troubadour: The Story of St. Francis of Assisi (1910)
