= Sea Slumber Song =

1899 song by Roden Noel and Edward Elgar

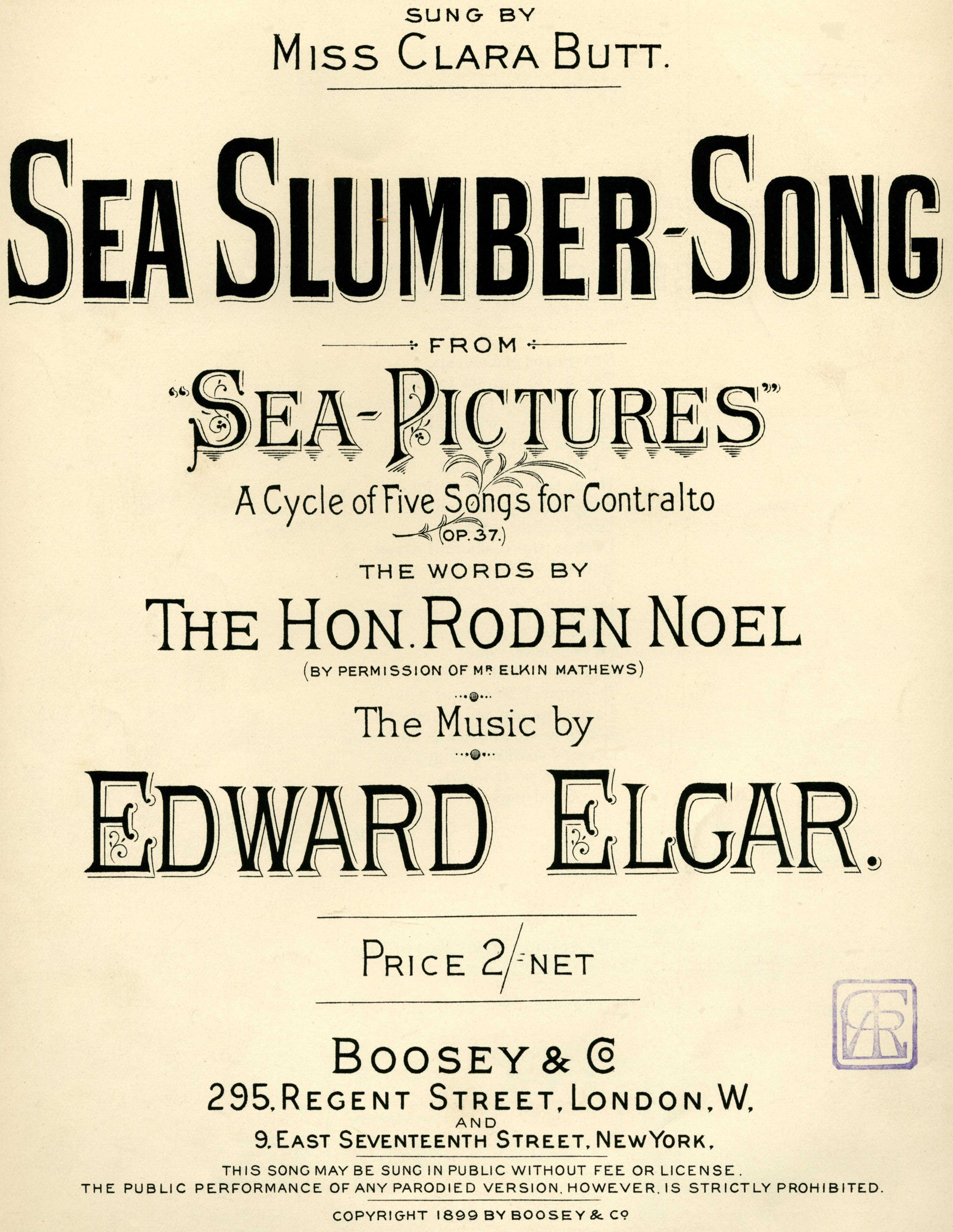

"Sea Slumber Song" is a 19th-century poem by Roden Noel set to music by Edward Elgar as the first song in his song-cycle Sea Pictures (1899).

== Lyrics ==
The poem here is as sung in Sea Pictures.

Italicised text indicates lines repeated in the song but not in the original poem.

Sea Slumber Song

Sea-birds are asleep,
The world forgets to weep,
Sea murmurs her soft slumber-song
On the shadowy sand
Of this elfin land;
"I, the Mother mild,
Hush thee, O my child,
Forget the voices wild!
Isles in elfin light
Dream, the rocks and caves,
Lulled by whispering waves,
Veil their marbles bright,
Foam glimmers faintly white
Upon the shelly sand
Of this elfin land;
Sea-sound, like violins,
To slumber woos and wins,
I murmur my soft slumber-song,
Leave woes, and wails, and sins,
Ocean's shadowy might
Breathes good-night,
Good-night!"

== Elgar's setting ==
The sea's lullaby ("I, the Mother mild") is evoked by bass drum and tam-tam and strings repeating a phrase that reappears later in the song cycle. At "Isles in elfin light" the music changes key to C major before returning to the oceanic theme.
