= Oh, soft was the song =

1910 song with words by Gilbert Parker

Edward Elgar in 1917

Oh, soft was the song is a song with words by Gilbert Parker set to music by the English composer Edward Elgar in 1910, as his Op. 59, No. 3. It is the second and last verse of a poem At Sea which Parker published in Volume I of a series of poems called Embers. The Opus 59 songs were part of a song-cycle of six romantic songs by Parker that was never completed – Nos 1, 2 and 4 were never composed. The other songs were Was it some Golden Star? and Twilight. The songs were originally written with piano accompaniment, but this was later re-scored by the composer for full orchestra.

The songs were composed between December 1909 and January 1910, and published by Novello's in 1910. Elgar's friend Edward Speyer sent him as a Christmas present some music scores of Beethoven String Quartets, and when Elgar thanked Speyer he added to his letter a quotation from Beethoven's Op.59 No.3.

The first performance was by Muriel Foster at the Jaeger Memorial Concert in the Queen's Hall on 24 January 1910.

== Lyrics ==
OH, SOFT WAS THE SONG

Oh, soft was the song in my soul, and soft beyond thought were thy lips,

And thou wert mine own, and Eden re-conquered was mine:

And the way that I go is the way of thy feet, and the breath that I breathe

It hath being from thee, and life from the life that is thine.

== Recordings ==
- Songs and Piano Music by Edward Elgar has "Oh, soft was the song" performed by Mark Wilde (tenor), with David Owen Norris (piano).
- Elgar: Complete Songs for Voice & Piano Amanda Roocroft (soprano), Reinild Mees (piano)
- The Songs of Edward Elgar SOMM CD 220 Christopher Maltman (baritone) with Malcolm Martineau (piano), at Southlands College, London, April 1999
