= Twilight (Elgar) =

1910 song with music by Edward Elgar

Edward Elgar in 1917

Twilight is a song with music by the English composer Edward Elgar written in 1910 as his Op. 59, No. 6. Elgar set the words of the poem The Twilight of Love, from Volume 2 of a series of poems called Embers by Sir Gilbert Parker. The Opus 59 songs were part of a song-cycle of six romantic songs by Parker that was never completed – Nos 1, 2 and 4 were never composed. The other songs were Oh, soft was the song and Was it some Golden Star?. The songs were originally written with piano accompaniment, but this was later re-scored by the composer for full orchestra.

The songs were composed between December 1909 and January 1910, and published by Novello's in 1910. The first performance was by Muriel Foster at the Jaeger Memorial Concert in the Queen's Hall on 24 January 1910.

== Lyrics ==
TWILIGHT

Adieu! and the sun goes awearily down,
The mist creeps up o'er the sleepy town,
The white sails bend to the shuddering mere,
And the reapers have reaped, and the night is here.

Adieu! and the years are a broken song,
The right grows weak in the strife with wrong,
The lilies of love have a crimson stain,
And the old days never will come again.

Adieu! Some time shall the veil between
The things that are, and that might have been,
Be folded back for our eyes to see,
And the meaning of all be clear to me.

== Recordings ==
- Elgar: Complete Songs for Voice & Piano Amanda Roocroft (soprano), Reinild Mees (piano)
- The Songs of Edward Elgar SOMM CD 220 Christopher Maltman (baritone) with Malcolm Martineau (piano), at Southlands College, London, April 1999
