= Was it some Golden Star? =

Edward Elgar in 1917

Was it some Golden Star? is a poem written by Gilbert Parker, published in Volume I of a series of poems called Embers. It was set to music by the English composer Edward Elgar in 1910, as his Op. 59, No. 5.

The Opus 59 songs were part of a song-cycle of six romantic songs by Parker that was never completed – strangely Nos 1, 2 and 4 were never composed. The other songs were Oh, soft was the song and Twilight. The songs were originally written with piano accompaniment, but this was later re-scored by the composer for full orchestra.

The songs were composed between December 1909 and January 1910, and published by Novello's in 1910. The first performance was by Muriel Foster at the Jaeger Memorial Concert in the Queen's Hall on 24 January 1910.

== Lyrics ==
WAS IT SOME GOLDEN STAR?

Once in another land,

Ages ago,

You were a queen, and I,

I loved you so:

Where was it that we loved--

Ah, do you know?

Was it some golden star

Hot with romance?

Was it in Malabar,

Italy, France?

Did we know Charlemagne,

Dido, perchance?

But you were a queen, and I

Fought for you then:

How did you honour me-–

More than all men!

Kissed me upon the lips;

Kiss me again.

Have you forgotten it,

All that we said?

I still remember though

Ages have fled.

Whisper the word of life,--

"Love is not dead".

== Recordings ==
- Elgar: The Collector's Edition, CD 29 Robert Tear (tenor), City of Birmingham Symphony Orchestra, Vernon Handley (conductor)
- The Songs of Edward Elgar SOMM CD 220 Christopher Maltman (baritone) with Malcolm Martineau (piano), at Southlands College, London, April 1999
