= The Deep Purple =

The Deep Purple may refer to:

- The Deep Purple (play), a 1910 stage play by Paul Armstrong and Wilson Mizner
- The Deep Purple (1915 film), a 1915 film directed by James Young
- The Deep Purple (1920 film), a 1920 film directed by Raoul Walsh

== See also ==
- Deep Purple (disambiguation)
