= Going Some (play) =

1908 play by Paul Armstrong and Rex Beach

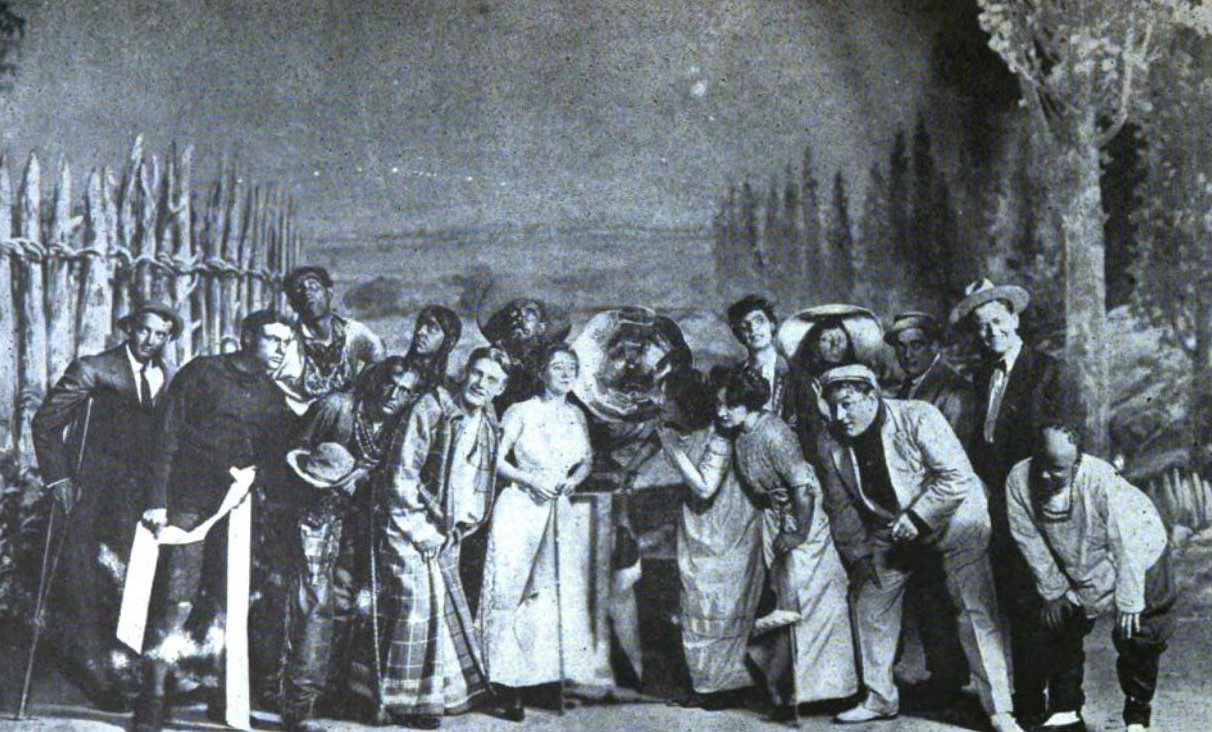
- Original language: English
- Written by: Paul Armstrong and Rex Beach
- Based on: Short stories by Rex Beach
- Subject: Cowboys and college men
- Genre: Farce
- Setting: Two ranches in New Mexico

Premiere
- Date: April 12, 1909
- Place: Belasco Theatre
- Directed by: George F. Marion and Paul Armstrong

Going Some is a 1908 play written by Paul Armstrong and Rex Beach, based on some short stories by Beach. It is a farce with four acts, three settings, and fast pacing. The play's action covers one week, and concerns a Yale man with no athletic ability roped into running a footrace for the honor of New Mexico ranch hands and the affection of a Smith College girl.

The play was first produced by Liebler & Company in March 1908, with staging by George F. Marion. The Shuberts bought the rights a year later and Paul Armstrong re-staged it. It had a short tryout in New Haven, Connecticut before premiering on Broadway in April 1909. Its first season on Broadway ended in late June 1909, after 96 performances.

The play was later adapted for a silent film of the same title in 1920.

== Characters ==
Listed in order of appearance within their scope.

Lead

- Helen Blake is from Smith College, (Note: The published play says "Smither College" in the cast of characters then Smith College in the text.) who has an understanding with Speed.
- Berekley Fresno is a young tenor from the Glee Club of Stanford University, who knows only two songs.
- J. Wallingford Speed called Wally, is from Yale (Note: The published play says "Kid College" in the cast of characters then Yale in the text.) where he was Varsity Head Yeller.
- Lawrence Glass called Larry was a trainer and football coach at Yale, who is now Speed's valet.

Supporting

- Aurelio Maria Carara is a Mexican cowboy at the Flying Heart, tormented by Mariedetta's coquetry.
- Willie is a spectacle-wearing cowboy at the Flying Heart, wanted by three sheriffs, and Mariedetta.
- Jeane Chapin is from Smith College, Helen's friend, and girl-friend to Culver Covington.
- "Still Bill" Stover is foreman of the Flying Heart Ranch.
- Roberta Keap called Bert, is business manager of Smith College Athletic Association. (Note: This character is inconsistently referred to as "Mrs." and "Miss" in the published play, while a cast list from 1909 also shows it as "Mrs.")

Featured

- Jack Chapin is a Yale alumni, Jeane's older brother, manager of the Flying Heart, fond of Roberta Keap.
- Cloudy is a Navajo cowboy at the Flying Heart, who played football with Carlisle. (Note: This character is the only cowboy who speaks in an educated manner, without dialect or drawl.)
- Skinner is cook at the Centipede Ranch whose speed captured the Flying Heart phonograph.
- Gabby Gallagher is foreman of the Centipede Ranch.
- Culver Covington is the Intercollegiate hundred-yard champion from Yale.

Bit player

- Mariedetta is a lovely Mexican domestic and resident butterfly at the Flying Heart. (Note: This character has only two lines but is often present on stage, indulging in background antics with various male characters.)
- Ah Sing Ho called Sing, is cook at the Flying Heart, and another of Mariedetta's conquests.

== Synopsis ==
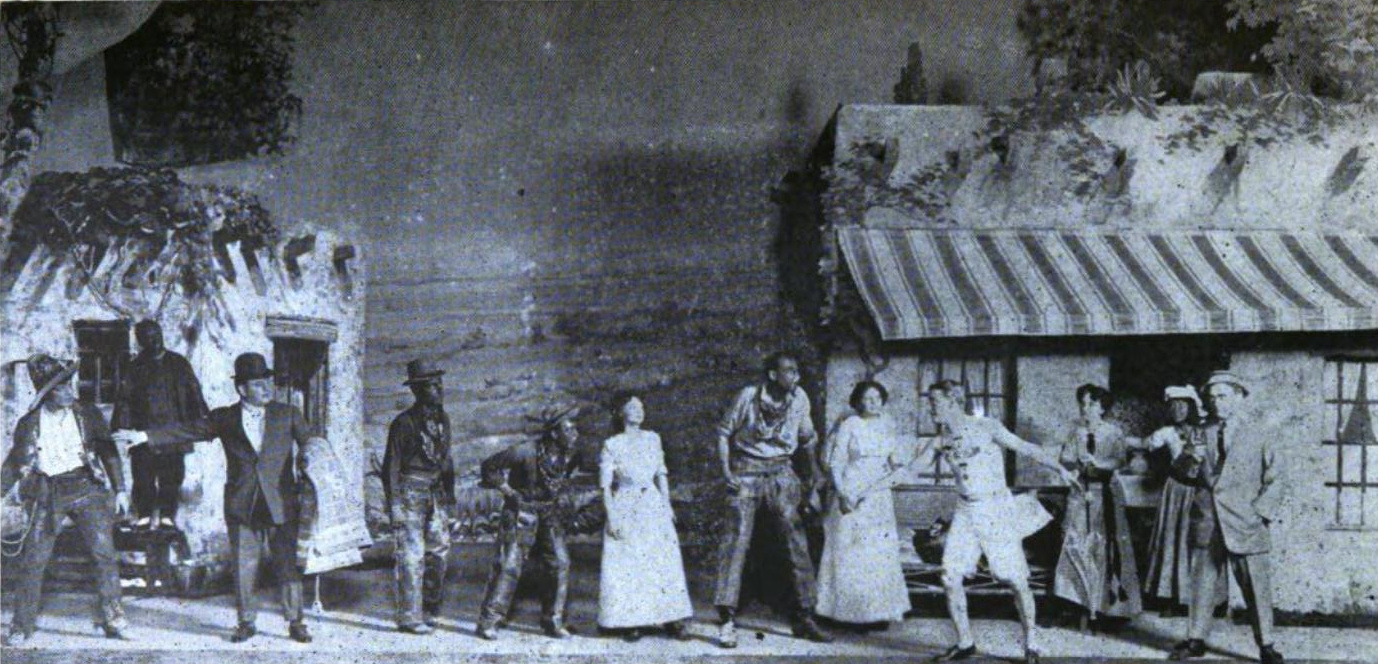

Act I (The Flying Heart Ranch in New Mexico, on a Monday.) Mariedetta flirts with Aurelio, Sing, and Willie. Jeane and Stover tell Helen how the Flying Heart lost its prize phonograph to the Centipede Ranch in a footrace. Jeane assures Stover that a man coming to the ranch will win it back. The girls hear Fresno singing and cover their ears. Jack and Bert enter, plainly in love. Jack tells Bert that Speed can't do sports. Jack leaves for a few days, after which Stover introduces the cowboys to Helen, and tells them about the new runner. Speed and Glass arrive to tumult of cowboy enthusiasm. Fresno is annoyed that Helen dotes on Speed. Glass adds himself to the number of Mariedetta's pursuers. Helen persuades Speed to win back the phonograph for the cowboys, while Glass warns him not to try. Speed's plan though is to win Helen's attention then withdraw in favor of Culver when he arrives. Jeane advances the cowboys' wages so they can challenge Centipede Ranch for the phonograph. As Fresno tries to time Speed in a trial, Glass knocks the stopwatch from his hands, breaking it. (Fast curtain)

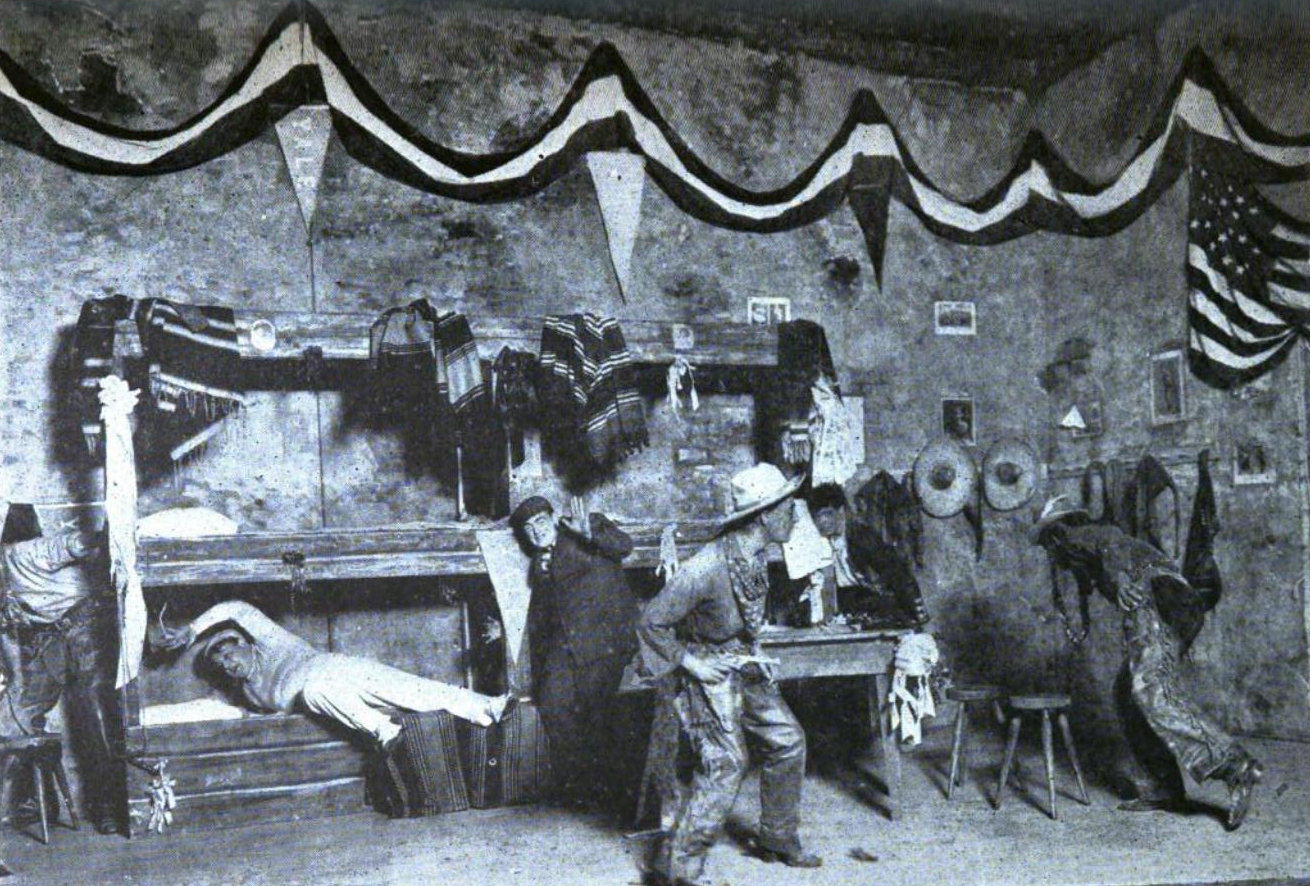

Act II (Interior of the bunkhouse at the Flying Heart Ranch.) Helen, Jeane, and Bert decorate the bunkhouse like a training gym. Fresno spars with Speed over Helen. Later, Fresno tells the cowboys that Speed is no athlete. The girls leave for town, and the cowboys corner Speed and Glass. Speed reassures them of his ability. He leaves, but the cowboys tell Glass his man better win or else. Willie threatens Glass with his gun, showing him all the notches. The cowboys leave, Speed returns to find Glass in a fit. Cloudy brings them a telegram, and reminds them how Carlisle beat Glass's Yale team. Mariedetta again draws Glass, but Carara stops him at knifepoint. Speed reads the telegram: Culver is in jail at Omaha! (Fast curtain)

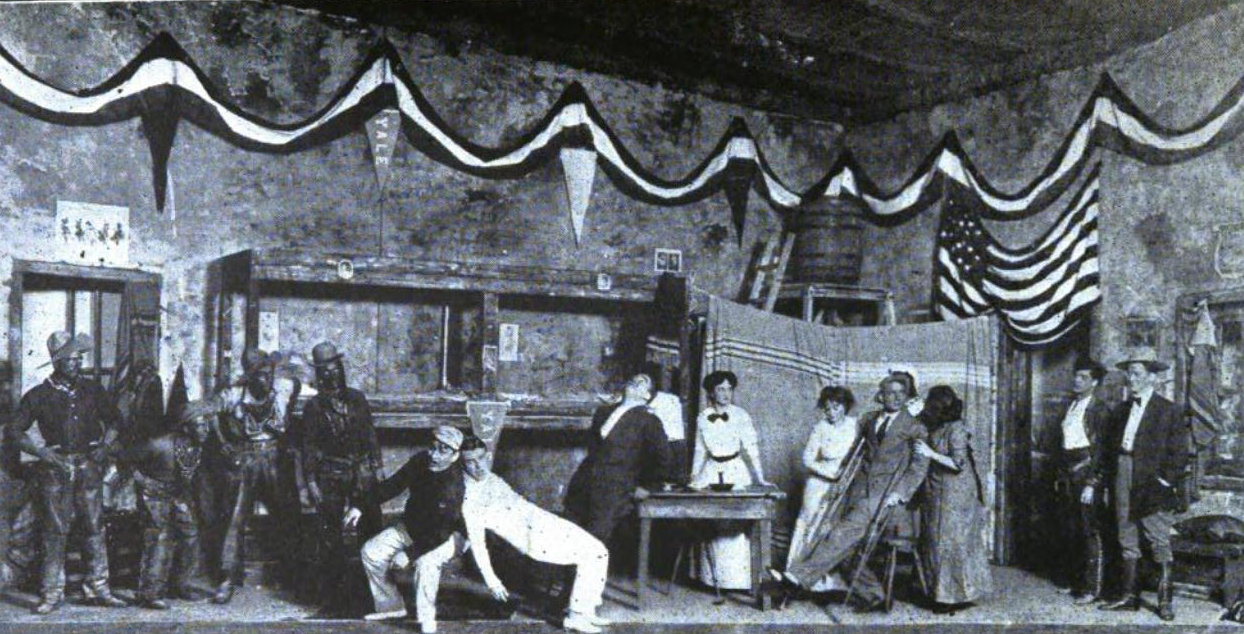

Act III (Same as Act II, Friday morning.) Glass rouses Speed for a morning run. Stover wakes the sleeping cowboys, and tells Willie to mount guard over Speed again today. Fresno says it will help Speed's training to take an ice shower and eat raw meat, eggs, and onion. They leave, and Skinner slips in through the window, hoping to see Speed. He vamooses when the cowboys return with an ice block for the shower barrel. They leave, and Speed and Glass return from the run. Speed takes a shower and is frozen. As he dries off, the cowboys return with Sing, who brings Speed's raw breakfast. Helen drops in, but she and Speed are unable to talk due to the hovering presence of Willie: Girls interfere with training. A telegram arrives: Culver is coming! Gabby Gallagher drops by to pry more bets from the cowboys. The bunkhouse gym fills with everyone on the ranch, as Jack enters bringing Culver... on crutches! (Fast curtain)

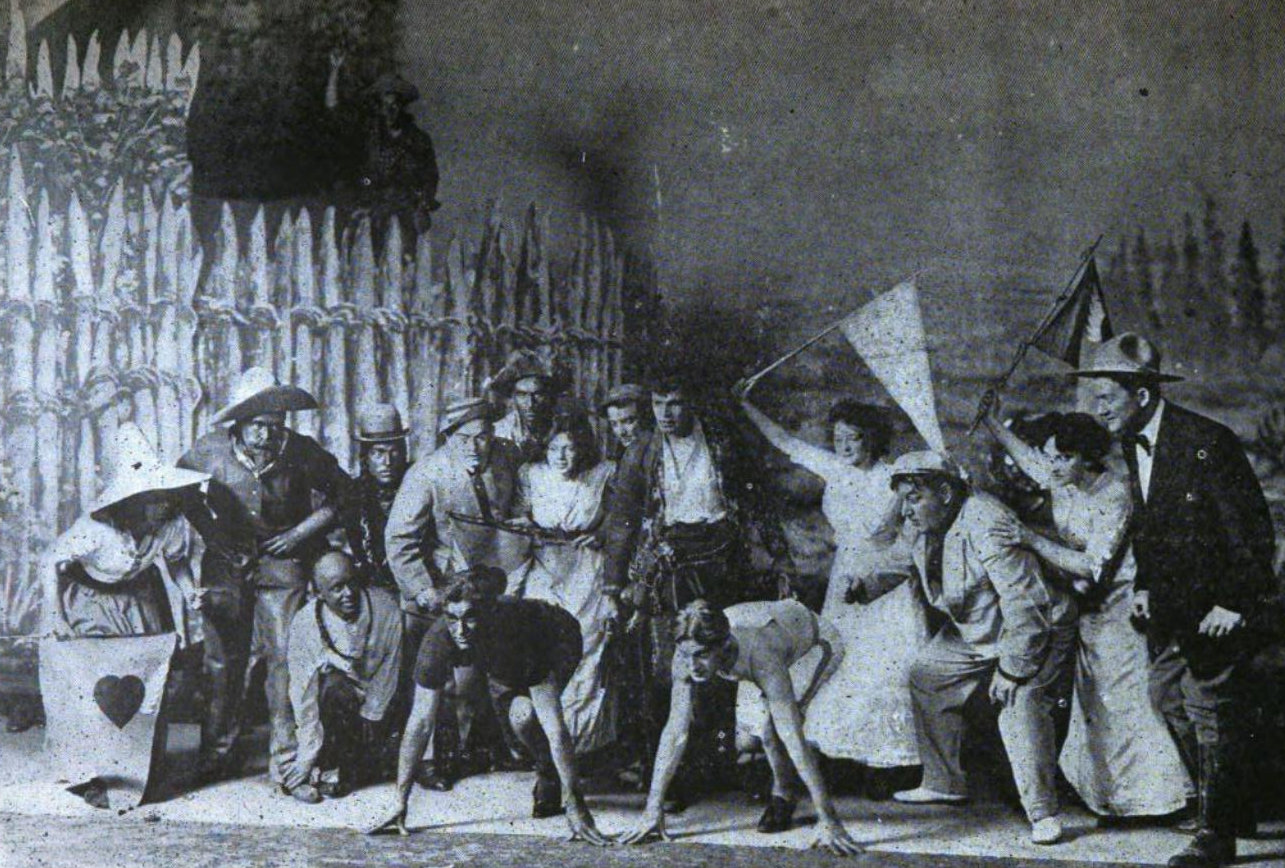

Act IV (Scene 1:Same as Act III. (Note: The scene is described in the published play as using the Act I setting, but the text and instructions within scene indicate the bunkhouse setting of Acts II and III. Newspaper reviews from 1909 also suggest the scene was the ranch exterior of Act I. This may represent a revision in the play done at an unknown date.)) A threeway confusion of couples comes to a head; when sorted out, everyone but Speed departs the bunkhouse. Skinner enters through the window again. He says the last race was fixed, and so can this one be if the price is right. They agree on $500 for Skinner to let Speed win. Skinner leaves as everyone else returns. Speed proclaims his impending victory. (Fast curtain)

(Scene 2:Corral of the Centipede Ranch in New Mexico, on Saturday.) Gabby and Skinner enter, checking the race course. Fresno enters and asks Gabby to place a secret $500 bet for him on Skinner to win. As others arrive, a flurry of bets and counter-bets ensues. The cowboys from both ranches cheer as Willie fires the starting pistol. Skinner and Speed race twice around the corral, and on the second pass Skinner falls down. Speed wins the race, and the Flying Heart cowboys set the phonograph going. (Curtain)

== Original production ==
=== Background ===
Armstrong had previously written Salomy Jane (1907) which George C. Tyler had successfully produced for Liebler & Company. This new play was based on some short stories by Rex Beach about fake runners. Tyler later wrote that Armstrong and Beach quarrelled and stopped speaking; they kept cutting each other's lines out of the script and inserting their own. Nevertheless, Liebler & Company bought a part interest in the play, and gave it a few tryouts at small theaters in Connecticut during March 1908, with staging by George F. Marion. It was well-enough received that a second tryout in Washington D.C. was undertaken in April 1908. This was also successful, but the play was "withdrawn" supposedly due to casting issues.

Armstrong and Beach then sold the play during February 1909 to the Shuberts. By mid-March 1909, Armstrong was leading rehearsals for the production he was staging. During late March the title was announced to be Mr. Speed, but within a few days was reverted back to Going Some. This phrase came out of sports journalism, which had been Armstrong's profession before playwriting, and was considered slang.

The Shuberts owned fourteen venues in Manhattan for both vaudeville and the legitimate stage; no other theatrical management company owned more than two. In early April 1909, Lee Shubert quit the Managers' Association, known as the Theatrical Syndicate, that was led by Klaw and Erlanger and Charles Frohman. He intended to found his own association. Independent managers like David Belasco, who had not yet declared, were courted by both sides. Lee Shubert's choice of Belasco's theater for this production, and their joint trip to New Haven for the tryout, was weighed as part of the coming campaign.

=== Cast ===
Principal cast for the New Haven tryout and Broadway run
Role	Actor	Dates	Notes and sources
Helen Blake	Oza Waldrop	Apr 08, 1909 - Jun 26, 1909	Oza Waldroy Meyer from Santa Rosa had her stage name misspelt as "Waldorp", or "Waldorf".
Berekley Fresno	Herbert Corthell	Apr 08, 1909 - Jun 26, 1909	
J. Wallingford Speed	Lawrence Wheat	Apr 08, 1909 - Jun 26, 1909	
Lawrence Glass	Walter Jones	Apr 08, 1909 - Jun 26, 1909	
Aurelio Carara	Escamilo L. Fernandez	Apr 08, 1909 - Jun 26, 1909	
Willie	George Leach	Apr 08, 1909 - Jun 26, 1909	
Jeane Chapin	Muriel Starr	Apr 08, 1909 - Jun 26, 1909	
"Still Bill" Stover	George K. Henery	Apr 08, 1909 - Jun 26, 1909	
Roberta Keap	Laura Lemmers	Apr 08, 1909 - Jun 26, 1909	
Jack Chapin	Thomas J. Karrigan	Apr 08, 1909 - Jun 26, 1909	This may be Thomas J. Carrigan though the only available cast list specifies "Karrigan".
Cloudy	Augustus Glassmeir	Apr 08, 1909 - Jun 26, 1909	
Skinner	William Harrigan	Apr 08, 1909 - Jun 26, 1909	
Gabby Gallagher	Hugh Cameron	Apr 08, 1909 - Jun 26, 1909	
Culver Covington	Charles H. West	Apr 08, 1909 - Jun 26, 1909	
Mariedetta	Crosby Little	Apr 08, 1909 - Jun 26, 1909	
Ah Sing Ho	W. Tammany Young	Apr 08, 1909 - Jun 26, 1909	

=== New Haven tryout ===
Going Some had a tryout on April 8, 1909, at the Hyperion Theatre in New Haven, Connecticut. Newspapers mentioned only that it was "successfully presented" and "well received".

=== Broadway premiere ===
The production premiered at the Belasco Theatre on April 12, 1909. The reviewer for The Brooklyn Daily Eagle said the audience laughed from start to finish, and praised Walter Jones as the trainer, Lawrence Wheat as the "bogus athlete", and Herbert Corthell as the "fat tenor". The New York Times critic said: "...the play has merriment enough to ensure it popular success", and also praised Walter Jones as "most amusing". The reviewer for The Brooklyn Citizen thought Escamilio Fernandez the best actor, and had praise for Herbert Corthell's tenor and Crosby Little as the silent flirt, but slighted lead Lawrence Wheat and said: "the other women in the cast had not much to do and didn't do that over well". The Brooklyn Times critic suggested the play would "stay just as long as it likes", liked actors Wheat, Jones, Fernandez, Corthell, and William Harrigan, and thought Oza Waldrop and Crosby Little the best of the actresses.

By the end of April, the Shuberts announced a second company for Going Some would be formed to present the play on tour.

=== Change of venue and closing ===
Going Some had its last performance at the Belasco Theatre on June 19, 1909, moving to Maxine Elliott's Theatre on June 21, 1909. The Sun reported that Paul Armstrong came from Virginia and Rex Beach from Chicago to attend the re-opening. The engagement was to continue all summer, but a sudden announcement by the Shuberts came on June 26, that the production would "temporarily" end that night for four weeks vacation at request of the leading players. Supposed to re-open on August 2, 1909, at Maxine Elliott's Theatre, instead the Shuberts presented a new play there, The Ringmaster, with Oza Waldrop, the female lead of Going Some in the cast.

== Adaptations ==
=== Film ===
- Going Some (1920 silent film)

== Bibliography ==
- George C. Tyler and J. C. Furnas. Whatever Goes Up. Bobbs Merrill, 1934.
