= Salomy Jane =

Salomy Jane may refer to:

- "Salomy Jane's Kiss", an 1889 western short story by Bret Harte, included in Stories of Light and Shadow (1898)
- Salomy Jane (play), a 1907 stage adaptation by Paul Armstrong
- "Salomy Jane", a 1910 western novel by Bret Harte
- Salomy Jane (1914 film), a 1914 silent film adaptation starring Beatriz Michelena and House Peters
- Salomy Jane (1923 film), a 1923 silent film adaptation from Paramount Pictures starring Jacqueline Logan
- Wild Girl (film), a 1932 pre-Code film adaptation of Salomy Jane's Kiss from Fox Film starring Joan Bennett
