= Wild Girl (film) =

1932 film directed by Raoul Walsh

- Lantern slide
- Directed by: Raoul Walsh
- Written by: Doris Anderson; Edwin Justus Mayer
- Based on: Salomy Jane by Paul Armstrong
- Starring: Charles Farrell; Joan Bennett; Ralph Bellamy; Eugene Pallette
- Cinematography: Norbert Brodine
- Edited by: Jack Murray
- Music by: Peter Brunelli (uncredited); R. H. Bassett (uncredited); J.S. Zamecnik
- Distributed by: Fox Film Corporation
- Release date: October 9, 1932 (United States)
- Running time: 78 minutes
- Country: United States
- Language: English

Wild Girl is a 1932 American pre-Code historical drama Western film directed by Raoul Walsh and starring Charles Farrell, Joan Bennett, Ralph Bellamy, and Eugene Pallette. The film was based on a play by Paul Armstrong Jr., which in turn was based on the 1889 short story, Salomy Jane's Kiss, and 1910 novel, Salomy Jane's Kiss, by Bret Harte. The story had been previously filmed as Salomy Jane (1914) and Salomy Jane (1923).

== Plot ==
Walsh's only Western between The Big Trail (1930) and Dark Command (1940) is an affectionate parody of the silent westerns Walsh himself made as a young director at Mutual that evolves into a lyrical romance filmed with tenderness and sincerity. Joan Bennett is "the eponymous irrepressible tomboy, who bewitches card sharps and escaped murderers in equal measure in the Redwood forests of the Sierra Nevada mountains".

== Cast ==
During the opening credits all the main characters are presented in a few sentences by the actors that portray them.

- Charles Farrell as The Stranger/Billy
- Joan Bennett as Salomy Jane
- Ralph Bellamy as Jack Marbury
- Eugene Pallette as Yuba Bill
- Irving Pichel as Rufe Waters
- Minna Gombell as Millie
- Willard Robertson as Red Pete
- Sarah Padden as Lize
- Morgan Wallace as Phineas Baldwin

== Production ==
Pre-production began in July, 1932, with members of the Fox company visiting locations in Sequoia National Park. Most of the cast was announced by early August. Shooting began in Sequoia on August 7, and lasted two weeks that same month. The primary farm set, built at picnic ground, became a brief tourist attraction while it stood. Upon the crew's return to Los Angeles on August 31, director Raoul Walsh told the press that he was very excited about Joan Bennett's performance: "Joan Bennett's came alive in this film... And I think I am a lucky guy to have directed her in it." An additional Western set was built at the Fox Studios.

== Reception ==
"Beautifully photographed and robustly directed adventure set in the West, centering around a backwoods girl, delightfully played by Joan Bennett, and her dealings with several men: a good-hearted gambler, a hypocritical, lecherous politician, a two-faced rancher, and a young stranger..." — Peter Bogdanovich

== Restoration and legacy ==
The film was restored by the MoMa in 2015.

It was part of the 2023 Walsh retrospective at the Cinémathèque française.

== See also ==
- Salomy Jane (disambiguation)
