= The Greyhound (play) =

1909 play by Paul Armstrong and Wilson Mizner

- Original language: English
- Written by: Paul Armstrong and Wilson Mizner
- Subject: Blackmail and confidence tricks on an ocean liner
- Genre: Melodrama
- Setting: San Francisco rooming house and the Mauretania

Premiere
- Date: February 29, 1912
- Place: Astor Theatre
- Directed by: Collin Kemper

The Greyhound is a 1911 play written by Paul Armstrong and Wilson Mizner. It is a melodrama with four acts, six settings, a large cast and fast pacing. The story is episodic, following four criminals working likely victims on an ocean liner, and showing how they are thwarted. Although containing elements of a thriller, comedy dominates, as a glance at names of featured characters suggests. The title comes from the contemporary description of fast transatlantic passenger ships as "ocean greyhounds".

The play was first produced by the Wagenhals & Kemper Company, and staged by Collin Kemper. There was a tryout in Indianapolis during January 1912, followed by an open run in Chicago. The Broadway premiere came during late February 1912. The production ran on Broadway up to June 1912, for over 100 performances.

The play was later adapted for a silent film of the same title in 1914.

== Characters ==
The characters are as given in theatre programs, newspaper cast lists and reviews from 1912.

Lead

- Louis Fellman alias The Greyhound is a criminal, supposedly reformed but still reprobrate. (Note: His alias refers to his preferred hunting ground, the transatlantic liners.)
- Jack Fay alias The Pale-Faced Kid is a roughneck and card sharp, with a beet-red countenance.
- J. Crawford Alexander alias Whispering Alex is a dapper forger and pickpocket.
- Kitty Doyle alias Deep Sea Kitty is a lively blackmailer posing as the Baroness Von Hilde. (Note: The term "deep sea blackmailer" had come in vogue some years earlier to describe those who took advantage of unwary passengers' confidences.)
- McSherry is a true reformed crook who acts as an agent of "The Eye", an anti-crime group.
- Claire Fellman is the wife of Louis Fellman, an honest woman married to a crook.

Supporting

- Murray is a detective.
- Henry Fenmore Watkins is a banker and hometown booster from Lima, Ohio, and an innocent abroad.
- Nettie Watkins is Henry's wife. (Note: Before the Broadway run this character was called Tillie.)
- Etta Watkins is the daughter of Henry and Nettie.
- Mrs. Foster Allen is a multimillionaire widow, whose older daughter is engaged to a duke.
- Porter Allen is Mrs. Allen's elder son.
- Percival Allen is Mrs. Allen's younger son, just twenty-years-old and naive.
- Bess Allen is Mrs. Allen's younger daughter, engaged to Bob Kirk.
- Bob Kirk is a former athlete and now a struggling young architect unable to afford marriage.

Featured

- Mrs. Fagin
- Maid
- Smoking Room Steward
- Ying Lee
- Steve (wireless operator)
- Isedore Knobb
- Montmorency Smith
- Van Rennsselaer Jones
- Truly Ewers
- Meta Train
- Mini Opals

Bit players

- Officers, Passengers, Sailors, Stewards, etc.

== Synopsis ==
The play may have been published as The Greyhound: A Play in Four Acts, date and publisher unknown. This synopsis is compiled from 1912 newspaper reviews.

Act I (A room in a lodging house at San Francisco, March 15.) J. Crawford Alexander, Kitty Doyle, and Jack Fay meet at the room of their leader, Louis Fellman. He tells them that wealthy Mrs. Allen will be sailing with her children on the Mauretania. They will make excellent targets for a variety of sly approaches. The gang plans to make their way across country to New York and board the vessel. Just outside, McSherry has been sent by "The Eye", which suspected Louis of backsliding. The three henchmen having departed, Louis is confronted by his wife Claire. She reproaches him for returning to crime. Worried she will shop him to police, he agrees to a joint suicide pact by poison. Louis fakes drinking while Claire collapses to the floor. He leaves, but McSherry enters and saves Claire by summoning an ambulance. (Curtain)

Act II (Hurricane deck of the steamship Mauretania, just underway from New York, June 5.) Passengers, stewards, and others mill about the deck. The gang covertly scouts their intended victims. Henry Watkins attracts attention for his obvious wealth and by calling the Hurricane deck the "roof" of the ship. The Allen matriarch and her brood come in for close scrutiny: they note Mrs. Allen's dissatisfaction with Bob Kirk as a suitor for Bess, and Percival's naive fascination with fashionable women. Among many other passengers, though, they miss seeing McSherry bring aboard Claire with a nurse to tend her. (Curtain)

Act III (Scene 1:Promenade deck of the Mauretania, mid-ocean, on June 9.) Kitty in her role of Baroness has bewitched young Percival, to the consternation of his mother. Later, Louis Fellman approaches Mrs. Allen with a note, supposedly from Bob Kirk but forged by Whispering Alex, suggesting he can be bought off for $50,000. (Two minutes intermission)

(Scene 2:The Smoking Room, mid-ocean, on June 9.) Jack Fay induces McSherry and Henry Watkins into a card game, under the misapprehension the former is a rich rube. Bob Kirk is also in the game, trying to win enough to marry Bess. When the deal comes around to McSherry, he deals Jack four aces, but gives Bob a Queen-high straight flush. Jack bets everything, but with the pot at $10,000 is busted by Bob's hand. (Two minutes intermission)

(Scene 3:The Grand Salon, mid-ocean, on June 9.) Mrs. Allen has given Louis a check for $50,000, unaware of Bob's new fortune. He promises not to cash it until the ship reaches France. She then catches Percival with the "Baroness" and sends him to his stateroom. The "Baroness" and her "attorney" Alex demand a settlement for "alienation", a subtle hint of blackmail to prevent a scandal. But Steve the wireless operator brings a radiogram at McSherry's behest, confirming there is no Baroness Von Hilde. (Curtain)

Act IV (Off the Irish coast, the hurricane deck at night, June 9.) Distraught by repeated glimpses of his "dead" wife, Louis has been drinking heavily. He still has the check for $50,000, but his confederates have been defeated and are penniless. Now Claire approaches Louis in the moonlight, appearing ghostly in all white. Louis backs away, then jumps over the railing into the ocean. With the ship's alarm sounding and cries of "Man overboard!", the play ends. (Curtain)

== Original production ==
=== Background ===
Paul Armstrong was a former journalist who turned to playwriting. However, his first career was in steamship navigation; he qualified for his Master's license in 1890. He managed a passenger line on the Great Lakes before taking up newspaper work around 1896. Wilson Mizner told reporters that a model for the criminal called The Greyhound was Bud Hauser. Hauser died on board the RMS Olympic, where he was traveling under an assumed name, during April 1912, while The Greyhound was still running on Broadway.

The play originally had a first act character called Dr. Dunn, which was eliminated by the time the production moved to Broadway. The early cast lists show this was acted by W. A. Lincoln, a play on producer Lincoln A. Wagenhals name. Wagenhals was an early graduate of the American Academy of Dramatic Arts and an experienced actor before joining up with Collin Kemper to form the Wagenhals & Kemper Company in early 1895.

=== Cast ===
Principal players only for the Indianapolis tryout, the Chicago opening, and the Broadway run
Role	Actor	Dates	Notes and sources
Louis Fellman	Henry Kolker	Jan 08, 1912 - Jun 01, 1912	
Jack Fay	Jay Wilson	Jan 08, 1912 - Jun 01, 1912	
J. Crawford Alexander	Douglas J. Wood	Jan 08, 1912 - Jun 01, 1912	
Kitty Doyle	Elita Proctor Otis	Jan 08, 1912 - Jun 01, 1912	
McSherry	Robert McWade	Jan 08, 1912 - Jun 01, 1912	
Claire Fellman	Louise Woods	Jan 08, 1912 - Jun 01, 1912	
Murray	Carl Harbaugh	Jan 08, 1912 - Jun 01, 1912	Harbaugh also played minor character Ying Lee.
Henry Watkins	Elmer Grandin	Jan 08, 1912 - Jun 01, 1912	
Nettie Watkins	Gladys Murray	Jan 08, 1912 - Jun 01, 1912	Murray also played minor character Mrs. Fagin, billed as "G. Fairbanks Murray". (Note: The Chicago run had both parts credited to Gladys F. Murray.)
Etta Watkins	Crosby Little	Jan 08, 1912 - Jun 01, 1912	
Mrs. Foster Allen	Jennie Eustace	Jan 08, 1912 - Jun 01, 1912	
Porter Allen	Edward Longman	Jan 08, 1912 - Feb 24, 1912	
Porter Allen	William S. Lyons	Feb 29, 1912 - Jun 01, 1912	
Percival Allen	David Burton	Jan 08, 1912 - Jun 01, 1912	
Bess Allen	Suzanne Willa	Jan 08, 1912 - Feb 24, 1912	
Bess Allen	Bernice Golden	Feb 29, 1912 - Jun 01, 1912	
Bob Kirk	Carl Eckstrom	Jan 08, 1912 - Jun 01, 1912	

=== Tryout and Chicago run ===
The production was given a week-long tryout starting January 8, 1912 at English's Opera House in Indianapolis, Indiana. Clarence J. Bulleit of The Indianapolis Star thought the play weaker than Armstrong's Alias Jimmy Valentine and The Deep Purple. He said there was no central plot, just loosely connected episodes of varying interest and quality. However, he praised the characterizations, which gave the work what strength it had. Bulleit also reported that Governor Marshall and Mayor Shank were present at the first night. The reviewer for The Indianapolis News felt the authors' "...incidents were too many; they are not nicely joined and uneven exposition is the result... it stands in need of compression, unity, and concentration".

The playwrights started making revisions during the tryout week, enhancing the performances appeal according to a local newspaper. The Greyhound closed in Indianapolis on January 13, 1912, and re-opened at Chicago's Studebaker Theatre on January 15, 1912. A Chicago Examiner reporter, evidently dismissing Indianapolis, described the opening as the play's "first appearance in any big city". Percy Hammond of the Chicago Tribune nearly echoed The Indianapolis News reviewer about the play's incidents: "...in their present form they are diffuse... They need pushing together, knitting, elimination, and speed."

The play closed in Chicago on February 24, 1912.

=== Broadway premiere ===
The Greyhound was originally scheduled to premiere at the Astor Theatre on February 26, 1912, but was delayed several days for "scenic and mechanical rehearsals". The delay was not an issue, for Wagenhals & Kemper owned (Note: They had purchased the property, next door to the Astor Hotel, in September 1905. Construction of the theater was completed a year later.) the Astor Theatre at this time, where their recent successes of Paid in Full and Seven Days had been performed. The premiere occurred on Leap Day, February 29, 1912, with The Sun explaining the title's dual reference to an "ocean greyhound" and the criminal who hunted thereupon. The critic for the New-York Tribune mentioned a special encore setting after the closing curtain of Act IV. The curtains re-opened showing the ship at dock; the actors strolled along the ship's railing to the open gangway, took their bow amid applause, then exit.

Charles Darnton of The Evening World thought the play weaker than the authors' earlier The Deep Purple but admired some of their "clever lines" and the acting of Elita Proctor Otis as Kitty and Jay Wilson as the Pale-Faced Kid. The reviewer for The Standard Union said: "Although abounding in thrills, the comedy element predominates and the laughter was almost incessent...". The critic for The Sun added: "It was potent to make the audience laugh, it kept its hearers absorbed, and occasionally it could impart a genuine thrill of suspense". The New York Times reviewer was enthusiastic: The Greyhound "...is, in spite of its rank sensationalism, an extremely clever thing in many ways... As an exposition of the illuminating qualities and directness of the vernacular, it is a remarkable exhibit".

By April 14, Wagenhals & Kemper had cancelled all other bookings at the Astor, since The Greyhound was still playing to capacity audiences. On April 27, 1912, the production got a foretaste of the labor strife that would soon engulf acting, when ten "supers" (Note: Supernumeraries, another term for extras or bit players.) portraying ship's stokers went on strike for higher pay, preventing the curtain from being raised. The theater manager replaced them with costumed stagehands and used other crew members to drive the strikers out of the theater.

=== Closing ===
On May 15, 1912, Wagenhals & Kemp Company signed an agreement with Cohan & Harris, giving the latter partnership a ten-year lease on the Astor Theatre, in return for $250,000. Cohan & Harris would assume control of the venue from September 1, 1912; until that time, or until Summer heat closed its season, The Greyhound would continue running. However, while not planning to retire from producing, (Note: They would continue producing Broadway plays up through The Joker in 1925.) Kemper and Wagenhals were looking forward to a long vacation, including a world tour. Despite mild temperatures, The Greyhound closed at the Astor Theatre on June 1, 1912.

== Adaptations ==
=== Film ===
- The Greyhound (1914) - This was a silent film produced by the Life Photo Film Corporation, which acquired the film rights to the play in early May 1914. Elita Proctor Otis reprised her stage role as Deep Sea Kitty, with David Wall as McSherry and William T. Koker as The Greyhound. Instead of the Mauretania, her newer sister ship, the Lusitania, was the liner represented in the film.

== In popular culture ==
Jack Finney's 1995 novel From Time to Time features a detailed description of The Greyhound as experienced by the time-traveling protagonist, Simon Morley, during his visit to 1912 New York. Simon attends a performance of the play and is struck by its staging — particularly Act III, Scene 2, depicting the card game followed by a series of onstage encores, and the climactic final scene in which a character leaps overboard from the deck of the Mauretania. Simon remarks on the realism of the production’s stage effects and the impressively loud sound of the ship’s horn.
