= The Deep Purple (1920 film) =

1920 film by Raoul Walsh

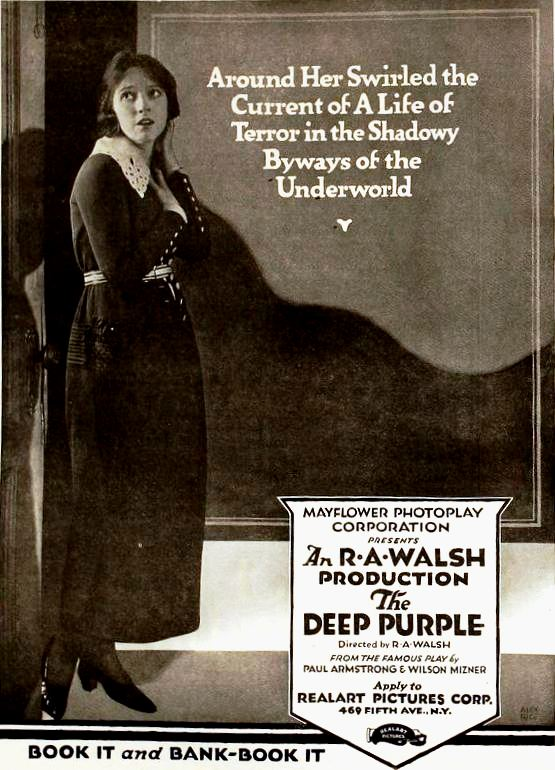
- Ad for film
- Directed by: Raoul Walsh
- Written by: Earle Browne (adaptation, scenario)
- Based on: The Deep Purple by Paul Armstrong and Wilson Mizner
- Produced by: Raoul Walsh
- Starring: Miriam Cooper; Helen Ware
- Cinematography: Jacques Bizeul (fr)
- Production company: Mayflower Photoplay Company
- Distributed by: Realart Pictures Corporation
- Release date: May 2, 1920
- Running time: 6 reels
- Country: United States
- Language: Silent (English intertitles)

The Deep Purple is a 1920 American silent crime drama film directed by Raoul Walsh from a 1910 play, The Deep Purple, co-written by Paul Armstrong and Wilson Mizner. The picture stars Miriam Cooper and Helen Ware and is a remake of the 1915 lost film The Deep Purple. It is not known whether the 1920 film currently survives.

== Plot ==
As described in a film magazine, country village maiden Doris Moore listens intently to the wooing of Harry Leland, a crook who is in the neighborhood with Pop Clark, another professional crook.

Believing in his promise of marriage, Doris goes with Harry and Pop when they return to the city. Kate Fallon, a boarding house keeper, protects Doris from Harry, but she becomes involved in a plot to rob William Lake, a wealthy westerner. Doris swings around to the right side when she meets William and love springs into being.

The crooks are defeated in their designs and William and Doris are then brought into happiness.

== Cast ==
- Miriam Cooper as Doris Moore
- Helen Ware as Kate Fallon
- Vincent Serrano as Harry Leland
- William J. Ferguson as Pop Clark
- Stuart Sage as William Lake
- William B. Mack as Gordon Laylock
- Lincoln Plumer as Connelly
- Ethel Hallor as Flossie
- Lorraine Frost as Phyllis Lake
- Louis Mackintosh as Mrs. Lake
- Amy Ongley as Christine
- Walter Lawrence as Finn
- J.C. King as Inspector George Bruce
- Eddie Sturgis as Skinny
- C.A. de Lima as Balke
- Bird Millman as High-Wire Performer
