= Deep Purple (disambiguation) =

Deep Purple are an English rock band.

Deep Purple or deep purple may also refer to:

- Deep Purple (album), 1969
- Deep Purple (Sun Ra album) (1973)
- "Deep Purple" (song), a 1933 song written by Peter DeRose and recorded in 1963 by Nino Tempo & April Stevens
- certain shades of purple

== See also ==
- The Deep Purple (disambiguation)
