= Romance of the Underworld =

1928 film

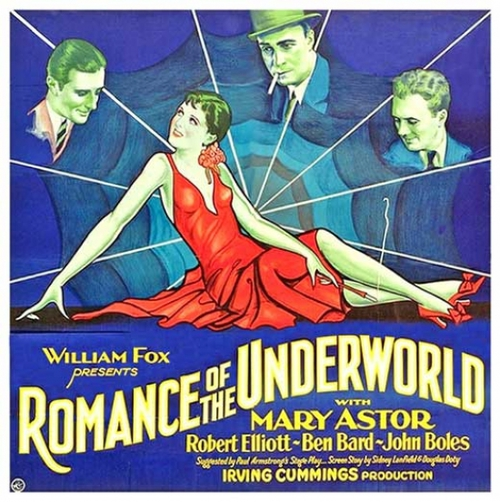
- Theatrical release poster
- Directed by: Irving Cummings
- Written by: Douglas Z. Doty (screenplay); Garrett Graham (intertitles)
- Story by: Douglas Z. Doty; Sidney Lanfield
- Based on: A Romance of the Underworld by Paul Armstrong
- Produced by: William Fox
- Starring: Mary Astor
- Cinematography: Conrad Wells
- Edited by: Frank Hull
- Distributed by: Fox Film Corporation
- Release date: November 11, 1928
- Running time: 68 minutes; 7 reels (6,162 feet)
- Country: United States
- Languages: Sound (Synchronized) (English intertitles)

Romance of the Underworld (1928)

Romance of the Underworld is a 1928 American synchronized sound drama film produced and distributed by Fox Film Corporation. While the film has no audible dialog, it was released with a synchronized musical score with sound effects using the sound-on-film movietone process. Directed by Irving Cummings and starring Mary Astor, it was based upon the 1911 stage play A Romance of the Underworld by Paul Armstrong. A previous version of the story was filmed as A Romance of the Underworld in 1918 by director James Kirkwood with Catherine Calvert in Astor's part.

== Plot ==
Judith Andrews, once a sweet country girl, comes to the city only to fall on hard times. Unable to find respectable work, she reluctantly accepts employment as a “hostess” in a seedy night club — a thinly disguised dance-hall dive. Though she hides her distaste, she dreams of escaping the life.

One night, during a police raid, Detective Edwin Burke singles her out. Seeing she is different from the others, he questions her briefly, advises her to “keep on running,” and lets her go. Meeting her again outside as she cries, he hands her a handkerchief — and inside it she finds a ten-dollar bill, a small act of kindness that stays with her.

Determined to change, Judith leaves the night club for work in a laundry, then as a waitress, and finally studies typing and stenography. She earns a respectable office position. In time she attracts the attention of Stephen Ransome, the young vice president of the firm. Unaware of her past, Stephen falls in love with her. Judith agrees to marry him, on the condition he never ask about her former life.

Their wedding is to be held in a judge's chambers. By coincidence, that same day Stephen's friend Derby Dan Manning is brought before the judge and sentenced to two years in prison. Dan is an old underworld acquaintance of Judith's.

Upon his release, Dan tracks Judith to her home, posing as a radio repairman. He confronts her, revealing he knows her past, and steals a bracelet and ring. He offers to return them only if she brings him $5,000 in cash that night.

Rather than submit, Judith turns to Detective Burke, whom she hasn't seen since the raid. Burke's manner remains calm, almost bored, but his mind is working quickly. He knows that Champagne Joe, a criminal associate, has a score to settle with Dan, who once stole Joe's sweetheart Flossie.

Burke discreetly sets Joe against Dan, letting one crook deal with another. Off-screen, Joe eliminates Dan — only a single gunshot is heard, with no melodramatic death scene shown. Burke thus spares Judith from blackmail without implicating her.

Stephen Ransome learns of Judith's past. At first stunned, he quickly realizes his love outweighs the revelations and forgives her. The danger removed, Judith's happiness is secure. Burke returns quietly to his ordinary home life, a family man once more.

== Cast ==
- Mary Astor as Judith Andrews
- Ben Bard as Derby Dan Manning
- Robert Elliott as Edwin Burke
- John Boles as Stephen Ransome
- Oscar Apfel as Champagne Joe
- Helen Lynch as Blonodie Nell
- William H. Tooker as Asa Jenks

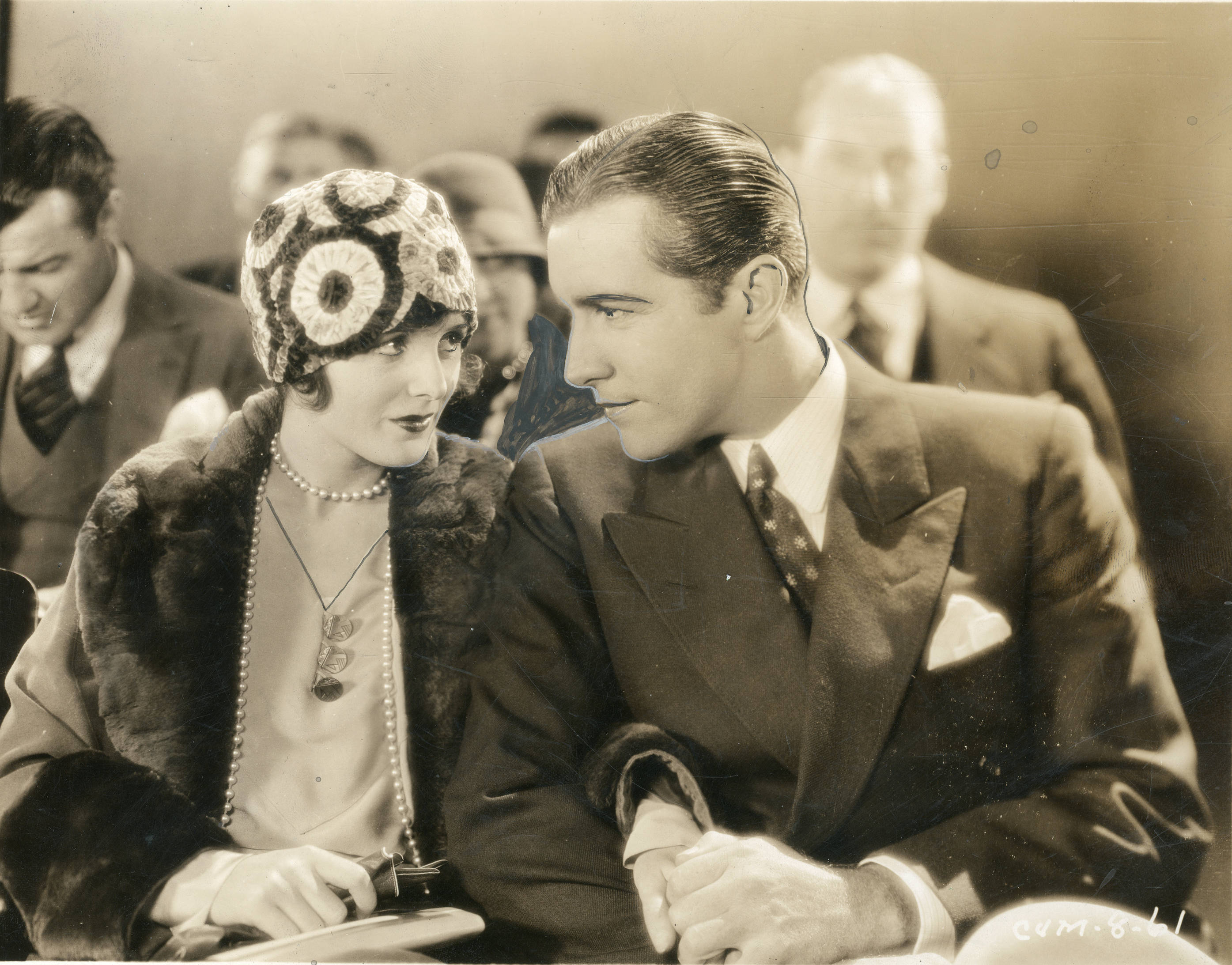
Scene from the movie

=== Uncredited ===
- William Benge as Bartender
- Maurice Black as Maitre D'
- Sherry Hall as Pianist
- John Kelly as window cleaner

== Music ==
The film featured a theme song titled "Judy", which was composed by Irving Kahal, Sammy Fain, and Pierre Norman.

== Censorship considerations ==
The Motion Picture Producers and Distributors of America, formed by the film industry in 1922, regulated the content of films through a list of subjects that were to be avoided. While Mary Astor portrayed a prostitute in Romance of the Underworld, this was acceptable as prostitution was not explicitly barred so long as it was not forced (i.e., white slavery) and aspects of her work were not shown in the film. Here the work of Astor's character is ambiguously described as being a "hostess."

== Preservation ==
Romance of the Underworld is extant at the Museum of Modern Art and in a European archive.

== See also ==
- List of early sound feature films (1926–1929)
