= Going Some =

1920 film

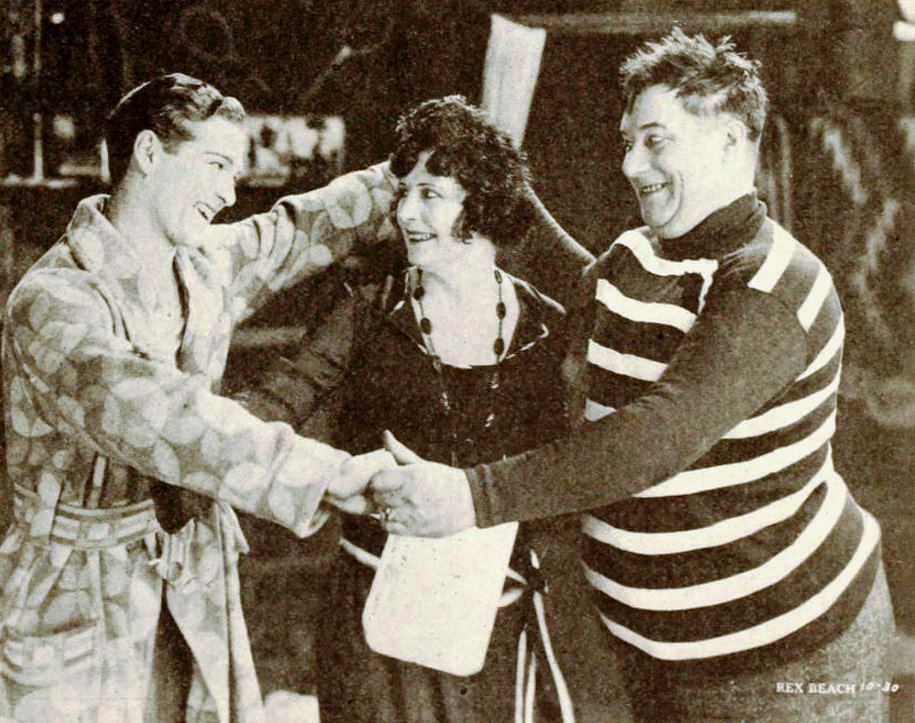
- Directed by: Harry Beaumont
- Written by: Laurence Trimble
- Based on: Going Some by Paul Armstrong and Rex Beach
- Produced by: Eminent Authors Pictures; Rex Beach; Samuel Goldwyn
- Starring: Cullen Landis; Helen Ferguson
- Cinematography: Norbert Brodine
- Distributed by: Goldwyn Pictures
- Release date: July 1920
- Running time: 50mins.
- Country: USA
- Language: Silent..English titles

Going Some is a lost 1920 silent film directed by Harry Beaumont. It stars Cullen Landis, Helen Ferguson, Kenneth Harlan and Lillian Hall. It was released by Goldwyn Pictures.

== Cast ==
- Cullen Landis - J. Wallingford Speed
- Helen Ferguson - Jean Chapin
- Lillian Hall - Helen Blake
- Lillian Langdon - Miz Gallagher
- Kenneth Harlan - Donald Keap
- Ethel Grey Terry - Mrs. Roberta Keap
- Willard Louis - Larry Glass
- Walter Hiers - Berkeley Fresno
- Frank Braidwood - Culver Covington
- Nelson McDowell - Still Bill Stover
- Snitz Edwards - Willie
- Hayward Mack - Laden
- Maurice Flynn - Skinner
