= One Way Passage =

1932 romantic pre-Code film

- Theatrical film poster
- Directed by: Tay Garnett
- Screenplay by: Wilson Mizner; Joseph Jackson
- Story by: Robert Lord
- Starring: William Powell; Kay Francis
- Cinematography: Robert Kurrle
- Edited by: Ralph Dawson
- Music by: Music and lyrics "If I Had My Way": James Kendis; Lou Klein
- Production company: Warner Bros. Pictures
- Distributed by: Warner Bros. Pictures
- Release date: October 22, 1932
- Running time: 68 minutes
- Country: United States
- Language: English
- Budget: $350,000
- Box office: $1,108,000

One Way Passage is a 1932 American pre-Code romantic film starring William Powell and Kay Francis as star-crossed lovers, directed by Tay Garnett and released by Warner Bros. Pictures. The screenplay by Wilson Mizner and Joseph Jackson is based on a story by Robert Lord, who won the Academy Award for Best Story.

== Plot ==
Dan Hardesty is an escaped murderer, sentenced to hang and on the run. In a Hong Kong bar, he literally bumps into Joan Ames, a terminally ill woman whose friends are wishing her bon voyage. It is love at first sight. In what will become a signature gesture for the couple, they share a Paradise cocktail, then Dan breaks the bowl of his glass, followed by Joan; they leave the stems crossed on the bar.

San Francisco Police Sergeant Steve Burke captures Dan at gunpoint when he leaves the bar (though out of sight of Joan) and escorts him aboard an ocean liner bound for San Francisco. Dan jumps into the water, dragging Steve with him. He takes the handcuff key from Steve's pocket and frees himself. Then he spots Joan among the passengers looking over the rail at them. He rescues floundering non-swimmer Steve rather than escape. Once the ship is underway, he persuades Steve to remove the handcuffs.

Dan and Joan fall in love on the month-long cruise, neither knowing that the other is under the shadow of death.

By chance, two of Dan's friends are also aboard, pickpocket Skippy and con artist "Barrel House Betty", masquerading as "Countess Barilhaus". The countess distracts Steve as much as she can to help Dan. Just before the only stop, at Honolulu, Steve has Dan put in the brig, but Dan gets out with their help and goes ashore to arrange escape on a steamer leaving that night. Joan intercepts him as he leaves the ship, and they spend an idyllic day together. When they drive back to the dock that evening, Dan starts to tell her why he cannot return to the ship, but she faints. Dan carries her aboard for medical help and stays by her side, forfeiting his chance at escape. Later, Joan's doctor tells Dan about her condition and that the slightest excitement or shock could be fatal. Dan tells the doctor the truth about himself.

Meanwhile, a romance blooms between Steve and the countess. When they near the end of the voyage, he awkwardly proposes to her. He wants to give up being a cop and live on a chicken ranch he owns. (Earlier in the film, Betty told Skippy that she dreamed of giving it all up and buying herself a chicken ranch.) She starts to tell him her true identity, but her confession is interrupted when a steward delivers a telegram to Steve. It is from his boss, telling him to find notorious con-woman Barrelhouse Betty and bring her in. He says nothing, as he still wants to marry her. They kiss, and Steve throws the telegram overboard.

Steve and Dan get ready to disembark, an overcoat draped over the handcuffs that link them. On an impulse, Joan goes to their cabin, where a steward who overheard the grim truth tells her about it. She frantically searches for Dan, and finds him with Steve. The two lovers part for the last time without letting on that they know each other's secret, and Joan collapses after Dan is out of sight.

They had agreed to meet again a month later, on New Year's Eve, at a bar in Agua Caliente, Mexico. At the appointed time and place, the dance floor is full, but the long bar is empty except for Skippy, standing solemnly at one end, and two bartenders at the other. The bartenders are startled by the sound of glass breaking. They turn to find the crossed stems and shattered pieces of two cocktail glasses lying on the bar. They glisten there for a moment and then vanish.

== Cast ==
- William Powell as Dan [Hardesty]
- Kay Francis as Joan [Ames]
- Aline MacMahon as "Barrel House Betty"
- Frank McHugh as Skippy
- Warren Hymer as Steve [Burke]
- Frederick Burton as the Doctor

Uncredited:

- Douglas Gerrard as Sir Harold
- Herbert Mundin as steward
- Roscoe Karns as ship's bartender
- Dewey Robinson as bartender in Hawaii
- Stanley Fields as captain in Hawaii
- Willie Fung as Chinese merchant
- Mike Donlin as bartender in Hong Kong

== Production ==
As the ship draws near San Francisco, Dan and Joan talk about the Golden Gates, remembering the words of a hymn. Dan says that when he was a little boy growing up in San Francisco, he thought the gates in the hymn were the Golden Gate of San Francisco. He is referring to the Golden Gate Strait at the mouth of San Francisco bay, not the Golden Gate Bridge. Construction on the bridge would begin in January 1933.

The film's working title was S.S. Atlantic.

This was the sixth time that Powell and Francis appeared together, and it was their biggest moneymaker.

Francis' gowns were created by Orry-Kelly, who had just joined Warner Bros. in 1932. He went on to win three Academy Awards for costume design.

James Kendis and Lou Klein are credited as composers. The pervasive love theme was reportedly written by W. Franke Harling, uncredited. Aloha O'e by Hawai'i's Queen Lili'uokalani, also figures prominently in the soundtrack.

Wilson Mizner and Joseph Jackson are credited as screenwriters. Critic Ken Hanke gave credit to director Garnett's role in honing the final screenplay: "The comedy content – involving unscrupulous but lovable con artists – has all the earmarks of being the work of noted cynic and part-time con artist Mizner."

Warner Bros. chartered the steamship Calawaii, along with a skeleton crew, for six days of intensive filming in May 1932. The ship was filmed at her dock, and at sea off the coast of Los Angeles.

== Reception ==
Mordaunt Hall wrote in The New York Times, "In its uncouth, brusque and implausible fashion, 'One Way Passage' ... offers quite a satisfactory entertainment. ... Tay Garnett's direction is clever. He keeps the story on the move with its levity and dashes of far-fetched romance."

Leonard Maltin gives the film 3 1/2 out of 4 stars, high praise for a "tender shipboard romance of fugitive Powell and fatally ill Francis, splendidly acted, with good support by MacMahon and McHugh".

Writing in 2013 in the Mountain Xpress, Ken Hanke described the film as:

The classic doomed lovers/shipboard romance movie... a perfect blend of romantic tragedy and hard-boiled comedy... The two elements perfectly complement each other in a way you find in very few films... A strange and strangely magical film from the very uneven filmmaker Tay Garnett, One Way Passage is a movie that once seen is unlikely to be forgotten... the film's brilliant balance of cynical comedy (provided by Frank McHugh and the wonderful Aline MacMahon) and tragic – ultimately mystical – romance.

In his autobiography Looking for a Street, writer Charles Willeford describes seeing the movie as a thirteen-year-old: "One Way Passage is still my all-time favorite movie, but I have never risked seeing it again. I cried so hard when the movie ended the usher took me out of the lobby and gave me a glass of water."

President Ronald Reagan wrote in his diary on January 8, 1982, that he and his wife Nancy watched the film at Camp David, writing: "We ran an old movie, One Way Passage – Kay Francis, Wm. Powell. It was wonderful."

=== Box office ===
According to Warners records, the film earned $791,000 in the US and Canada and $317,000 elsewhere. This success led the studio to remake the film in 1940.

=== Awards and honors ===
Robert Lord won an Oscar for his original story.

== Remake ==
One Way Passage was remade in 1940 as 'Til We Meet Again, featuring Merle Oberon, George Brent, Pat O'Brien, Binnie Barnes and Geraldine Fitzgerald. Although some scenes strongly echo the original, it is not a word-for-word, shot-for-shot remake, and there are new characters. Frank McHugh reprises his role as Dan's pickpocket friend; his state of perpetual inebriation is a pose in the later film.

== Radio adaptations ==
- One Way Passage was presented on Warner Brothers Academy Theater April 3, 1938. Ronald Reagan and Gloria Dickson starred in the 30-minute adaptation.
- "One Way Passage” was presented on Lux Radio Theatre March 6, 1939. Original stars William Powell and Kay Francis reprised their roles, although Kay Francis filled in for Norma Shearer who bowed out due to illness. The production was 60 minutes in three acts.
- One Way Passage was presented on Philip Morris Playhouse September 12, 1941.
- One Way Passage was presented on The Screen Guild Theater April 5, 1948 starring Barbara Stanwyck, Robert Taylor, and Ward Bond.
- One Way Passage was presented on Hollywood Sound Stage February 14, 1952. The 30-minute adaptation starred Ruth Roman and Frank Lovejoy.
