= The Deep Purple (play) =

1910 play by Paul Armstrong and Wilson Mizner

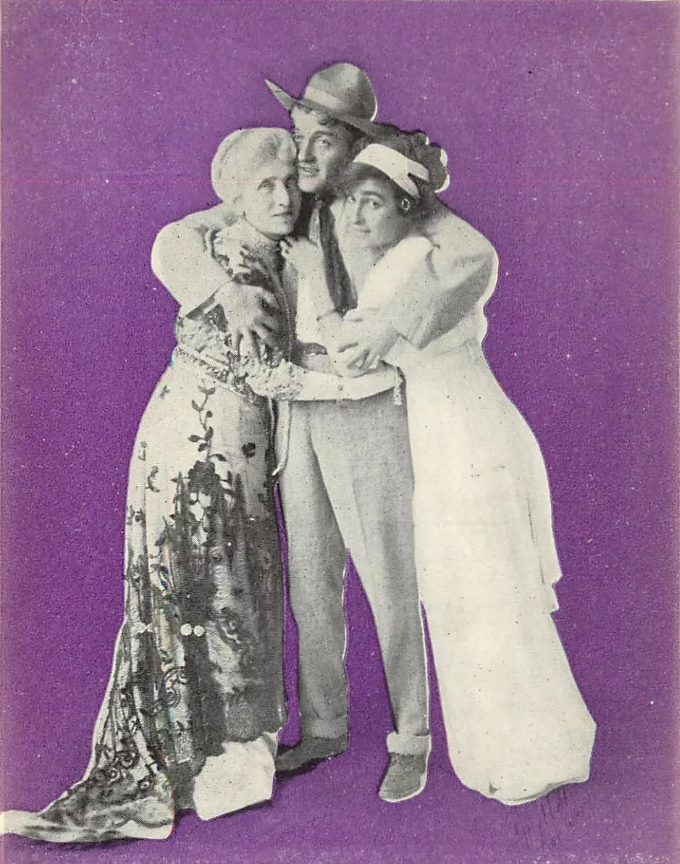
- Isabel Waldron, Richard Bennett, and Mabel Morrison in The Deep Purple
- Original language: English
- Written by: Paul Armstrong and Wilson Mizner
- Subject: Badger game
- Genre: Melodrama

Premiere
- Date: January 9, 1911
- Place: Lyric Theatre
- Directed by: Hugh Ford

The Deep Purple is a 1910 play written by Paul Armstrong and Wilson Mizner. It is a melodrama with four acts, a large cast, three settings, and fast pacing. The story concerns an attempted badger game broken up by the intended victim who rescues the unwitting female lure from a gang. The title refers to the nobility of the protagonist's character, that he was "bred in the deep purple".

The play was first produced by Liebler & Company, staged by Hugh Ford, and starred Richard Bennett. It had a short tryout in Rochester, New York, during September 1910, followed by a fourteen-week run in Chicago, before premiering on Broadway in January 1911. Its first season on Broadway ended in May 1911, after 152 performances.

The play was later adapted for silent films of the same title in 1915 and 1920.

== Characters ==
The play was never published, so characters are described as depicted in 1910-1911 reviews.

Lead

- William Lake is a young, wealthy, western-born mining engineer visiting Manhattan.

Supporting

- Gordon Laylock is a western train robber, fond of Kate, looking for a second chance at life.
- Harry Leland is a charming, debonair, and unrepenetant criminal, a man without scruples or sympathy.
- Kate Fallon called Frisco Kate is a reformed thief now running a boarding house.
- Doris Moore is a clergyman's daughter from Buffalo, New York, an unwitting lure for the badger game.
- Pop Clark is an older erudite crook, "a lean Falstaff" to the gang, who discerns weakness in others.

Featured

- Flynn
- Connolly is a shady hotel detective working with the gang.
- Mrs. Lake is William's widowed mother, who lives in a luxury apartment in Manhattan.
- Ruth Lake is William's younger sister, who lives with her mother.
- George Bruce is a New York police captain, honest, and a friend of William Lake.
- Christine

Bit Players

- Valet
- Organ Grinder
- Page
- Bell Boy
- Messenger
- Postman

== Synopsis ==
The play was never published, so the following is compiled from contemporaneous newspaper reviews.

Act I (Basement parlor of Frisco Kate's boarding house in the West Forties of Manhattan.) Harry Leland has enticed Doris Moore to Manhattan with a promise of marriage. Harry and his partner Pops Clark have inserted their gang into Frisco Kate's boarding house by threatening to expose her past crimes to police. When Doris arrives, Kate determines to protect her from Leland. Also staying at Kate's is Gordon Laylock, a western train robber with four notches on his gun. He and Kate are both trying to go straight. They overhear Harry and Pops coaching Doris on how to lure a wealthy man to the boarding house. Realizing Gordon is a danger, the gang has him arrested by Connolly and taken to Riker's Island. (Curtain)

Act II (Scene 1: A parlor in a Manhattan hotel.) William Lake, just returned from the west, greets his mother and sister at the hotel. Doris contrives to run into William and solicits his help valuing some mining stock. He agrees to go with Doris to visit her mother at their apartment. However, Kate has followed Doris and now warns William that its a trap. When his own mother and sister return, William sends them off to the Broadway theatres. He then arms himself and escorts Doris out.

(Scene 2: Same as Act I.) When Doris and William return to the boarding house, Harry and Pop Clark are waiting. They threaten William's life unless he coughs up a large sum of money. But William draws his gun and promises to kill Harry right there. Doris, still under Harry's charms, begs for his life. William relents, and takes Doris away with him.(Curtain)

Act III (Mrs. Lake's apartment.) William brings Doris to his mother's apartment. He summons his friend Captain George Bruce and tells him the story of the gang's plot. George warns his friend that the girl is likely to be a bad one. William tests her by leaving her alone with a large sum of money. Meanwhile, Harry has traced Doris to the Lake apartment. Spying the money, he makes a grab for it, but Doris blocks his attempt at it. William then comes out of hiding to chase off Harry. Later, while waiting alone at the apartment, Doris receives a telephone call saying her father has come to town and will meet her at the boarding house. (Curtain)

Act IV (Same as Act I.) Frisco Kate has managed to get Gordon set loose from Riker's.They return to the boarding house. Doris arrives, thinking to find her father, but it was a trick. William enters, in search of Doris. He and Gordon denounce Harry and Pop Clark as conmen, which Doris in a last spasm of feeling tries to refute. Harry threatens to shop Kate and Gordon, then turns on Doris. He will tell her family that she is a criminal, too. Incensed by the threats, Gordon pulls out a pistol and kills Harry. When Capt. Bruce and the police arrive, William persuades them to treat it as suicide. William then gives Gordon and Kate money for travel to Algiers, where a job in William's company awaits. Doris will return to her family, her honor intact. As he takes leave of William, Gordon says "I've met many game men in my time, but you-- you were bred in the deep purple". (Curtain)

== Original production ==
=== Background ===
Armstrong and Mizner sold the play, originally entitled In the Deep Purple, during March 1910 to Liebler & Company. This was a partnership between investor T. A. Liebler and producer-manager George C. Tyler. Though not a member of the Theatrical Syndicate, Tyler had a good working relationship with its leaders, including Charles Frohman. He convinced Frohman to let him sign away Richard Bennett for The Deep Purple and future productions.

Armstrong had previously written Salomy Jane (1907) and Alias Jimmy Valentine (1909), both of which Tyler had successfully produced for Liebler & Company. Their streak of collaboration would end with The Deep Purple, when Armstrong filed for an injunction to halt performances of The Deep Purple, then in its third week at Chicago. He asserted the play was being hurt by unauthorized changes to lines. The temporary injunction was granted, but performances continued. (Note: It is presumed that Liebler & Company filed for a stay of the injunction, but no source is available to confirm this.) Armstrong stopped speaking with Tyler directly, communicating through intermediaries. A newspaper reported that Armstrong left Chicago in November 1910, having apparently dropped the litigation. When a reporter later asked whether Tyler's casting was responsible for the success of The Deep Purple, Armstrong replied: "Any village quartet can sing The Larboard Watch". (Note: An 1859 song by Thomas E. Williams.)

=== Cast ===
Principal cast only for the Rochester opening, the Chicago run and first Broadway season
Role	Actor	Dates	Notes and sources
William Lake	Richard Bennett	Sep 24, 1910 - May 20, 1911	Despite being recruited by Tyler, Bennett did not get star billing in ads.
Gordon Laylock	Emmett Corrigan	Sep 24, 1910 - May 20, 1911	
Harry Leland	Jameson Lee Finney	Sep 24, 1910 - May 20, 1911	
Kate Fallon	Ada Dwyer	Sep 24, 1910 - May 20, 1911	Dwyer had been managed by Liebler & Company for eleven years.
Doris Moore	Catherine Calvert	Sep 24, 1910 - May 20, 1911	Calvert was Armstrong's discovery, and would eventually become his second wife.
Pop Clark	W. J. Ferguson	Sep 24, 1910 - May 20, 1911	
Flynn	George M. Fee	Sep 24, 1910 - May 20, 1911	
Connolly	George T. Meech	Sep 24, 1910 - May 20, 1911	
Mrs. Lake	Isabel Waldron	Sep 24, 1910 - May 20, 1911	
Ruth Lake	Mabel Morrison	Sep 24, 1910 - May 20, 1911	Morrison was the wife of Richard Bennett, who played Walter Lake, and mother of his three daughters. (Note: The actresses Joan Bennett, Constance Bennett, and Barbara Bennett.)
George Bruce	William A. Norton	Sep 24, 1910 - May 20, 1911	
Christine	Rosamond O'Kane	Sep 24, 1910 - May 20, 1911	

=== Rochester opening and Chicago run ===
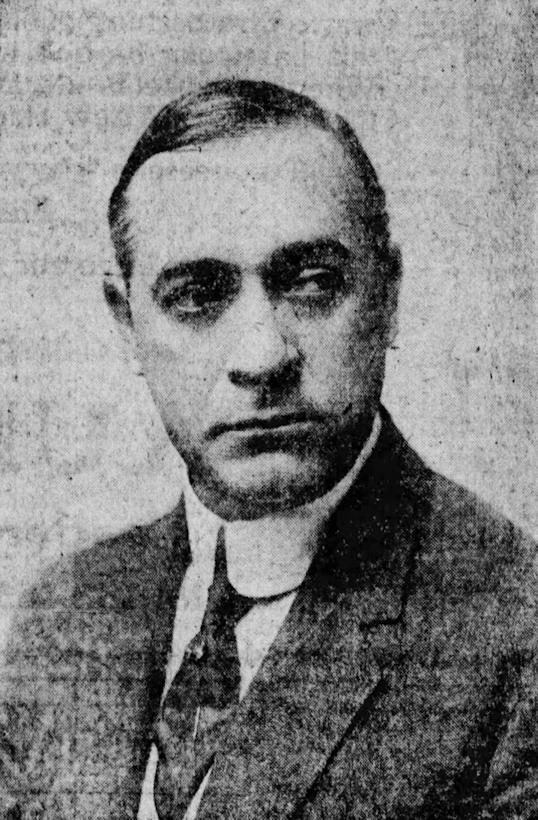
Emmett Corrigan

The Deep Purple opened at the Shubert Theatre in Rochester, New York on September 26, 1910. It was a limited run of three days, a tryout before the production went to an open engagement in Chicago. The local reviewer said: "As a play, The Deep Purple is a sample of excellent melodramatic construction. It introduces its characters with descriptive clarity and it proceeds to unfold its action and plot with directness and coherence". They also remarked on the "refreshing excellence" of the cast, in which even the bit players exhibit aptitude.

The production then moved to the Princess Theater in Chicago, opening there on October 3, 1910. Percy Hammond of the Chicago Tribune echoed the Rochester reviewer in praising Armstrong's (Note: Most reviewers of this play, after an initial mention of Wilson Mizner, thereafter referred only to Armstrong in relation to the writing.) construction of the play: "But in The Deep Purple he does little for which there is no excuse, and the play, therefore, is the most reasonable of his interesting output". Hammond also praised Hugh Ford's staging, Tyler's casting, and gave credit for interesting performances to the six principals (Note: Richard Bennett, Emmett Corrigan, Ada Dwyer, Jameson Lee Finney, Catherine Calvert, and W. J. Ferguson.)

Eric DeLamarter, writing for The Inter Ocean, was a little more critical about two plot points, and while praising Emmett Corrigan, seemed to slight the lead: "In the role of William Lake was Richard Bennett, pleased with his part and his own interpretation". He concluded that while the play was melodrama, it was also "mighty fascinating".

After its run in Chicago was twice extended, Percy Hammond offered a fourteenth-week ode to The Deep Purple for "idol-smashing achievements". Hammond reflected "We now know that a man may be turned from the duty of living a man's life, in Mr. Pinero's phrase, without getting maudlin about it; that a woman may reform because she feels like it... that one man may kill another who needs killing without explaining that he was animated by other than motives of personal vengeance".

=== Broadway premiere ===
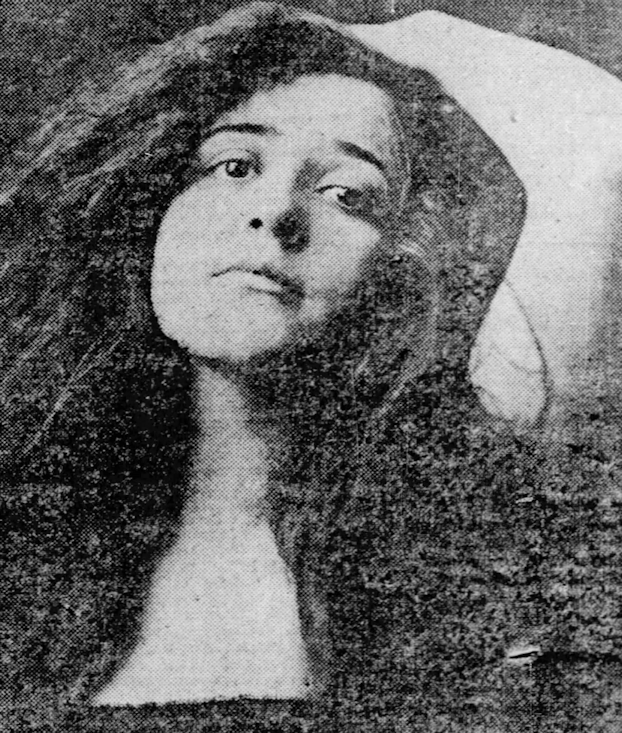
Catherine Calvert

The play had its Broadway premiere on January 9, 1911, at the Lyric Theatre. Where Chicago reviewers had been positive, the trend of Broadway criticism was negative. The New York Times review sub-heading called it a "Crudely Contrived Melodrama Without Plausibility to Create Much Illusion". The reviewer did compliment the acting of Richard Bennett, Ada Dwyer, and Emmett Corrigan, and thought whatever merit the production had was due to the cast, with the exception of Catherine Calvert.

The Times review was generous compared to that of The Sun, which blasted the play as "stupid", "amateurish and tiresome", and which decried in separate paragraphs "vulgarity", "crude vulgarity", and "crass vulgarity". But the reviewer did admit that "Some of the actors helped the play along", particularly Jameson Lee Finney and Ada Dwyer. The critic for The Brooklyn Daily Eagle knocked the play for being a weak version of a melodrama, and said if it did attract audiences it would mean Manhattan playgoers are "gullible". They ascribed the play's failings to the writers, and expressed sympathy for the "capable players" who "waste their efforts" in the production.

A contrary opinion came from Charles Darnton of The Evening World, who said: "It is rough, but seldom crude, and weak only when it grows sentimental. The truth of its type cannot be questioned, and its dialogue rings equally true... Moreover, the acting is the best I've seen in many a night." Darnton was most impressed with Ada Dwyer's performance, and just as underwhelmed by another: "Miss Catherine Calvert is so bad she is funny. She is ridiculously amateurish."

=== Change of venue and closing ===
The Deep Purple closed at the Lyric Theatre on April 22, 1911, and moved to Maxine Elliott's Theatre on April 24, 1911. It then closed at Maxine Elliott's Theatre on May 20, 1911, after 152 (Note: The total includes a matinee and evening performance on the final day.) performances.

== Adaptations ==
=== Film ===
- The Deep Purple (1915 film)
- The Deep Purple (1920 film)

== Bibliography ==
- George C. Tyler and J. C. Furnas. Whatever Goes Up. Bobbs Merrill, 1934.
