= The Deep Purple (1915 film) =

1916 film by James Young

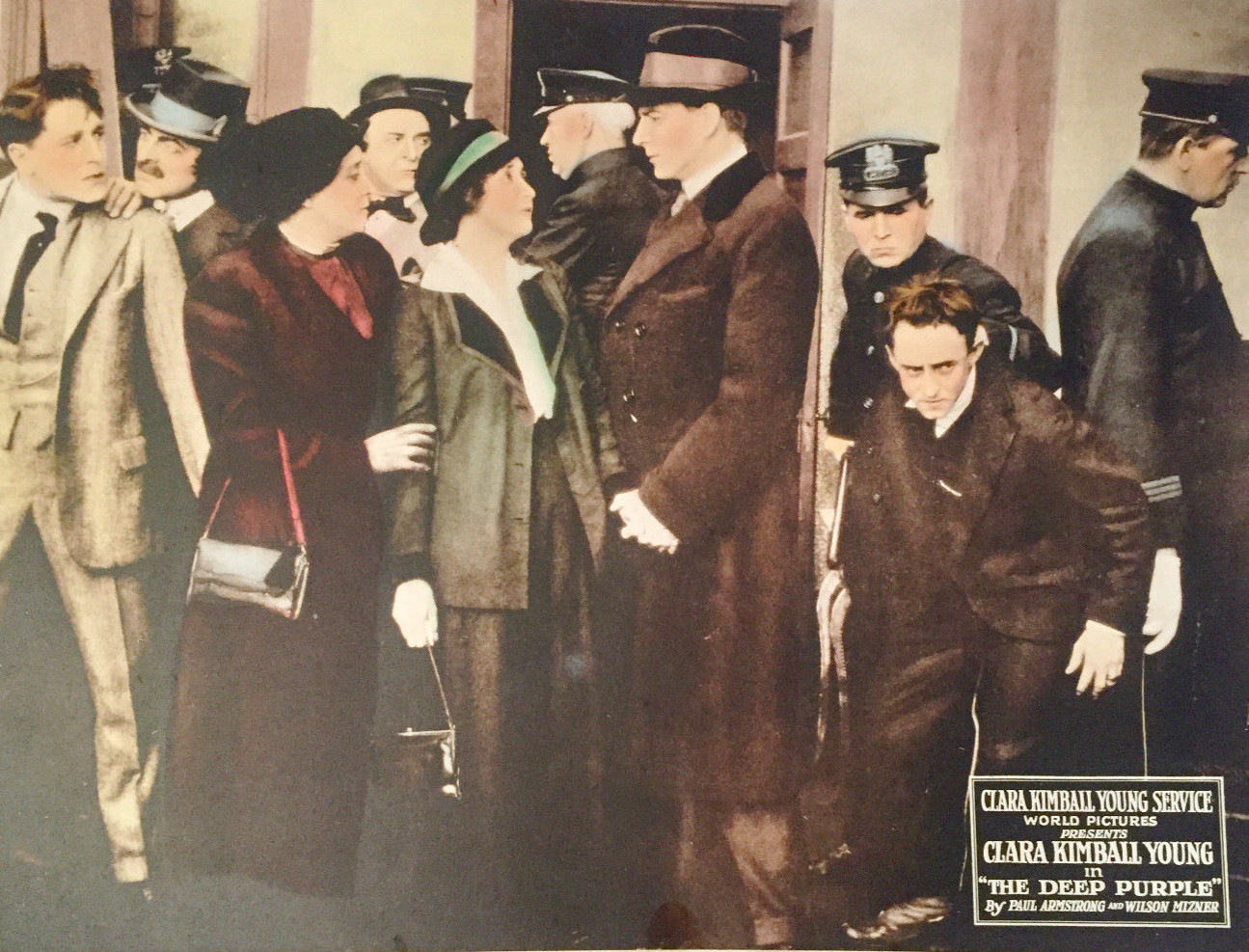
- Directed by: James Young
- Produced by: Peerless Productions
- Starring: Clara Kimball Young; Milton Sills
- Cinematography: Arthur Edeson
- Distributed by: World Film Corporation
- Release dates: January 11, 1915; December 4, 1916 (re-released)
- Running time: 5 reels
- Country: USA
- Language: Silent (English intertitles)

The Deep Purple is a lost 1915 silent film directed by James Young. The film stars Clara Kimball Young and Milton Sills, and was remade in 1920 again titled The Deep Purple by director Raoul Walsh.

The film is based on a 1910 play, written by Paul Armstrong and Wilson Mizner, produced on Broadway in 1911, starring Richard Bennett.

This is the first film of actress Esther Ralston, then 13 years old, who has a bit role.

== Cast ==
- Clara Kimball Young - Doris Moore
- Edward Kimball - Rev. William Moore
- Milton Sills - William Lake
- Mae Hopkins - Ruth Lake
- Mrs. E.M. Kimball - Mrs. Lake
- William J. Ferguson - 'Pop' Clark
- Grace Aylesworth - 'Fresno' Kate Fallon
- Crauford Kent - Harry Leland
- Frederick Truesdell - Inspector Bruce
- DeWitt Jennings - Gordon Laylock
- Walter Craven - Pat Connelly

unbilled cast

- Esther Ralston - Bit, Angel
- Bert Starkey - Bit
