= Wilson Mizner =

American writer (1876–1933)

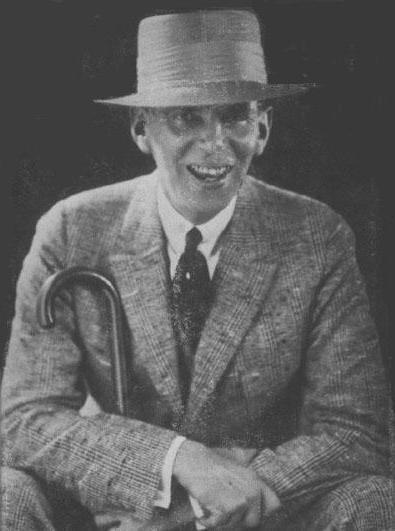
- Born: May 19, 1876; Benicia, California, U.S.
- Died: April 3, 1933 (aged 56); Los Angeles, California, U.S.
- Resting place: Cypress Lawn Memorial Park, Colma, California
- Occupations: Writer, entrepreneur, con man
- Relatives: Lansing Bond Mizner, Ella Watson (parents); Addison Mizner (sibling); John Kemp Mizner (first cousin once removed)
- Writing career
- Years active: 1908–1933; 1909–1912 (as playwright); 1931–1933 (in Hollywood)
- Notable works: One Way Passage; 20,000 Years in Sing Sing; The Little Giant

Wilson Mizner (/ˈmaɪznər/ MIZE-ner) (May 19, 1876 – April 3, 1933) was an American playwright, raconteur, and entrepreneur. His best-known plays are The Deep Purple, produced in 1910, and The Greyhound, produced in 1911. He was manager and co-owner of the restaurant The Brown Derby in Los Angeles, California, and was part of the failed project of his older brother Addison to create a new resort in Boca Raton, Florida. He and Addison are the protagonists of Stephen Sondheim's musical Road Show (alternately known as Wise Guys, Gold!, and Bounce).

== Biography ==
Wilson ("Bill") Mizner was born in Benicia, California, one of eight children, including brothers William, Edgar, Murray, Addison, Henry, and Lansing and sister Mary. Portrait painter Sir Joshua Reynolds was their great-great-uncle. Their father, Lansing Bond Mizner, was named Benjamin Harrison's Envoy Extraordinary and Minister Plenipotentiary to the Central American states, and the family relocated to Guatemala for a year, the brothers allegedly spending their free time robbing churches, as they later claimed (both brothers recounted unverifiable details about their foreign experiences).

In 1897, Addison and Wilson, with brothers William and Edgar, traveled north to the Klondike Gold Rush in Canada, where he allegedly bilked miners rather than looking for gold. He claimed later that he operated badger games, managed fighters, robbed a restaurant to get chocolate for his girlfriend "Nellie the Pig" Lamore (saying "Your chocolates or your life!"), and grub-staked prospector Sid Grauman, later of Grauman's Chinese Theatre. He also claimed to have met Wyatt Earp, who became a lifelong friend. In Skagway, Alaska, Wilson met Jefferson Randolph "Soapy" Smith, whom Wilson considered his mentor.

He followed gold seekers to Nome, Alaska when the Nome Gold Rush started in 1899. As he told it (there is no confirmation), he was known as the "Prince of Nome", established McQuestion, a saloon/casino, and was appointed deputy sheriff, where his "primary duty" was "to warn Eskimos that they'd have to smell better".

After leaving Alaska, he claimed to have managed a banana plantation in Honduras for a few months, but returned to San Francisco to resume his career as a professional gambler. Once Addison had established himself in New York, Wilson joined him, and became a New York dilettante, raconteur, and Broadway playwright. He married Mary Adelaide Yerkes, widow of industrialist Charles Tyson Yerkes, in 1906. Wilson was penniless (and 29 years old), while his new wife, aged 48, brought between $2 million and $7.5 million to the marriage and a $4 million mansion on Fifth Avenue, as well as several artistic masterpieces by Rembrandt, Van Gogh, and others, that Wilson duplicated, selling the copies as originals. The marriage did not last long, as the publicity generated "numerous" letters from California and Alaska warning the new Mrs. Mizner about her husband's past criminal activities; their divorce was finalized in May 1907.

He then made his living by gambling on luxury liner boats between New York and London, until the companies prohibited it. Wilson then managed the Rand Hotel on West Forty-ninth Street in New York, posting signs that read "Carry out your own dead" and "No opium smoking in the elevators". He managed several boxers, fixing the fights to enhance his gambling revenues. One of his fighters, Stanley Ketchel, the greatest middleweight of his time, was murdered, and Wilson joked, "Tell 'em to start counting ten over him, and he'll get up."

Wilson's playwriting career was undermined by his laziness and an opium addiction that started when he was prescribed painkillers after an assault. He was convicted in 1919 for operating a gambling den on Long Island, and received a suspended sentence. After he was nearly beaten to death – the details are unknown – at Addison's invitation he followed him to Palm Beach, Florida, where Addison and other investors were announcing a new resort, Boca Raton, Florida. Wilson was secretary and treasurer of the Mizner Development Corporation created in 1925, in effect working for his brother. Unfortunately Addison's plans were unsound financially and the Corporation was forced into receivership within a year, and bankruptcy soon afterward.

Addison could no longer pay Wilson, so he returned to California. There, he obtained backing from Jack L. Warner and Gloria Swanson and bought into and managed the Brown Derby restaurants, and wrote screenplays for some of the early talk movies. His best known movie work is the screenplay for the Michael Curtiz movie 20,000 Years in Sing Sing. Wilson called his Hollywood years "a trip through a sewer in a glass-bottomed boat". Several of the brothers' friends from New York, including Marie Dressler and Ben Hecht, helped him in his later escapades.

Wilson Mizner is noted for several bons mots such as, "Be nice to people on the way up because you'll meet the same people on the way down", "Never give a sucker an even break" (also attributed to W. C. Fields), and "When you steal from one author, it's plagiarism; if you steal from many, it's research". When President Calvin Coolidge died in 1933, Mizner's comment was "How do they know?" (Coolidge was known as taciturn.) Mizner has suffered the same fate as Dorothy Parker; both are remembered today mainly for their witty repartee rather than for specific literary works.

Irving Berlin (a friend of Addison) wrote a song about Wilson: "Black Sheep Has Come Back to the Fold". He began but did not complete a musical based on Wilson's life.

Anita Loos and Robert Hopkins based the character played by Clark Gable in the movie San Francisco on Wilson Mizner, whom Loos described as "America's most fascinating outlaw".

Biographer Alva Johnston wrote:

[Wilson] Mizner had a vast firsthand criminal erudition, which he commercialized as a dramatist on Broadway and a screenwriter in Hollywood. At various times during his life, he had been a miner, confidence man, ballad singer, medical lecturer, man of letters, general utility man in a segregated district, cardsharp, hotel man, songwriter, dealer in imitation masterpieces of art, prizefighters, prizefight manager, Florida promoter, and roulette-wheel fixer. He was an idol of low society and a pet of high. He knew women, as his brother Addison said, from the best homes and houses.

That Wilson Mizner was a ballad singer, medical lecturer, "general utility man in a segregated district", songwriter, and roulette-wheel fixer are all undocumented except in his own unreliable words.

=== Warner Bros. ===
Around 1931, Warner Bros. chief producer Darryl Zanuck hired Mizner to work as a screenplay writer for the studio's First National movies. While at the studio, Mizner had hardly any respect for authority and found it difficult to work with studio boss Jack Warner. Mizner, however, would indeed become a valuable asset to the studio's movies. As time went by, Warner became more tolerant of Mizner and invested in the Brown Derby restaurants.

=== Death ===
Mizner died from a heart attack on April 3, 1933.

== Writings ==
=== Plays ===
- The Only Law, 1909
- The Deep Purple, 1910, with Paul Armstrong.
- The Greyhound, 1911, with Paul Armstrong.

=== Stories ===
- "The Discord of Harmony", The All-Story Magazine, November 1908
- "Three Saved!", Collier's, December 26, 1908
- The Cock-Eyed World, (1929)
- "You're Dead!", Liberty, May 3, 1930 and Argosy (UK), May 1937 (posthumous reprint)

== Filmography ==
Taken from IMDb:

Year	Film	Activity (if not main writer)
1914	The Greyhound	from his play
1915	The Deep Purple (lost)	from his play
1917	The Law of Compensation	story
1920	Outlaws of the Deep (short)	scenario
1920	The Five Dollar Plate (short)	scenario
1920	The Deep Purple (survival unknown)	from his play
1929	The Cock-Eyed World	story
1932	The Dark Horse	
1932	Winner Take All	adaptation
1932	One Way Passage	
1932	Lawyer Man	uncredited
1932	20,000 Years in Sing Sing	
1932	Frisco Jenny	
1933	Hard to Handle	
1933	Strictly Personal	story
1933	The Mind Reader	story
1933	The Little Giant	original screenplay
1933	Heroes for Sale	
1934	Merry Wives of Reno	uncredited
1957	"One Way Passage" (episode of Lux Video Theatre)	original screenplay
