= William J. Ferguson =

American stage and silent film actor

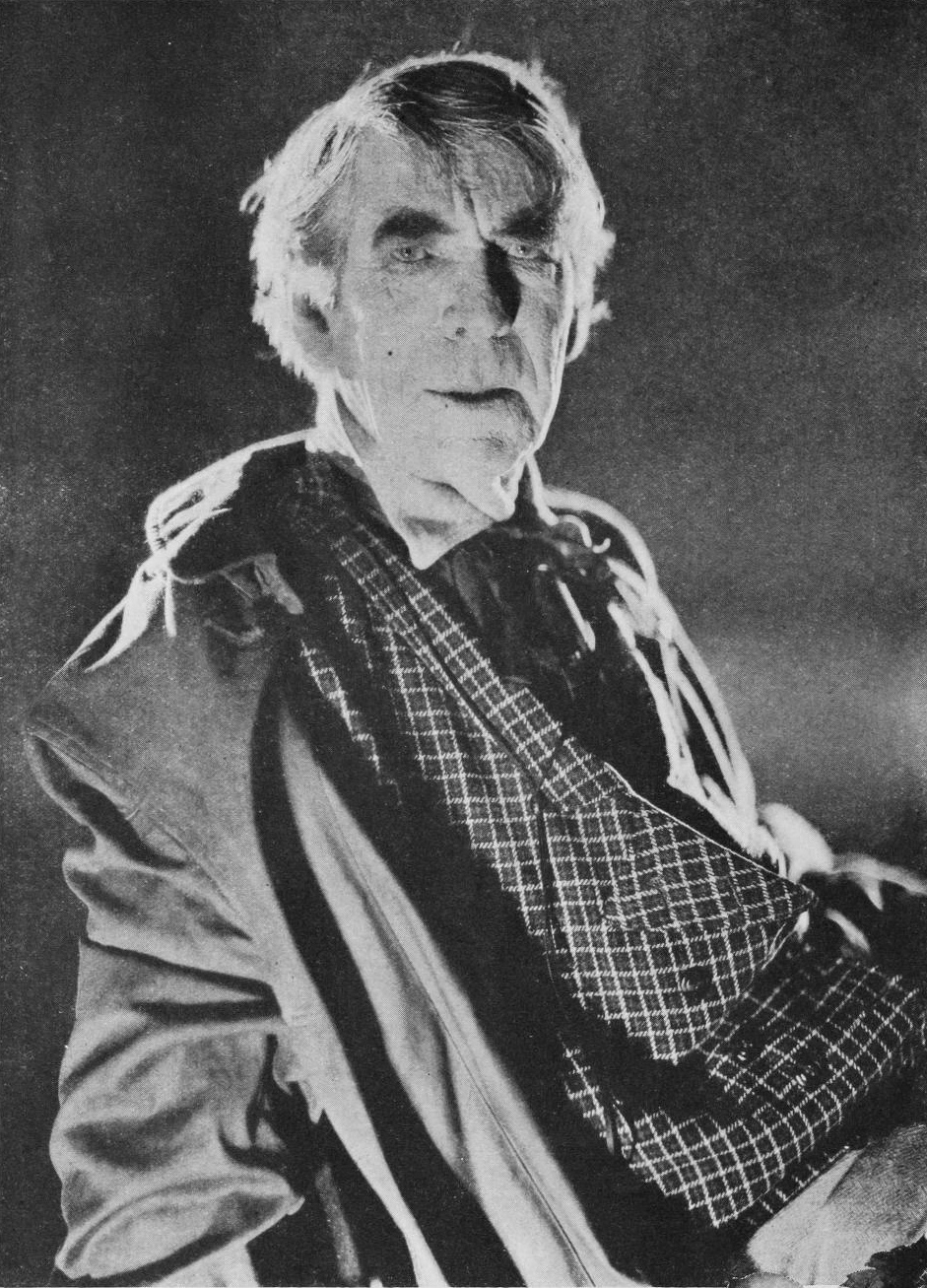
William J. Ferguson

William J. Ferguson, also known as W. J. Ferguson, (June 8, 1845, Baltimore – May 3, 1930, Pikesville, Maryland) was an American stage and silent film actor. Ferguson was an actor on Broadway from 1885 through 1920 after having already worked in the theatre in other American cities for the two decades prior. He appeared in films from 1914 until 1922 when injuries sustained from an accidental fall ended his career as a performer. At the time of his death in 1930, he was the last surviving cast member of Ford's Theatre's 1865 production of Tom Taylor's Our American Cousin. At the age of 19, Ferguson witnessed the assassination of Abraham Lincoln on April 14, 1865, while performing on stage in this production. Fifty years later Ferguson portrayed President Lincoln in the 1915 film The Battle Cry of Peace.
