= Paul Armstrong (playwright) =

American playwright

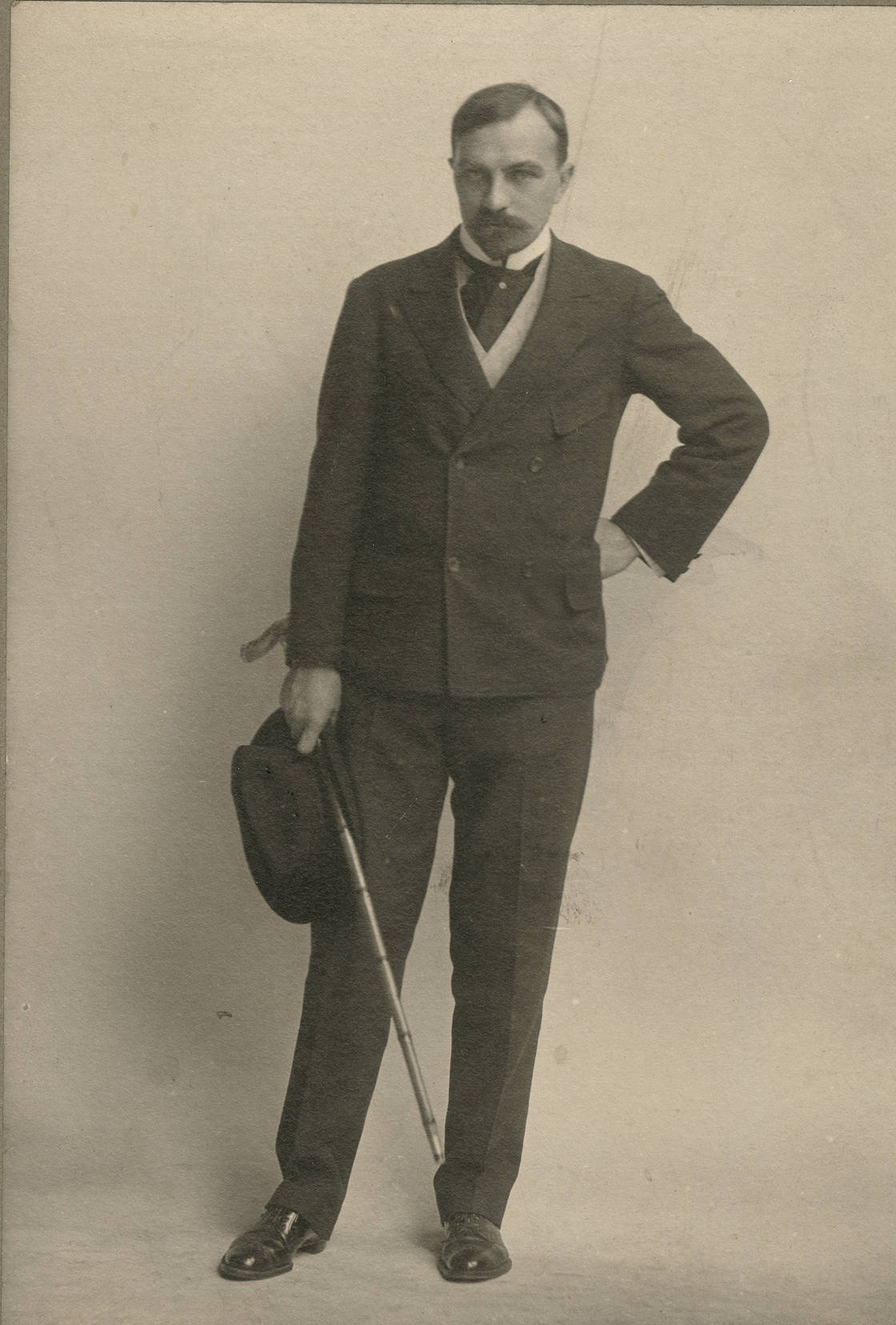
- Armstrong in 1905
- Born: April 25, 1869; Kidder, Missouri, U.S.
- Died: August 30, 1915 (aged 46); Manhattan, New York City, U.S.
- Occupation: Playwright
- Spouses: Rella Abell (m. 1899; div. 1913); Catherine Calvert (m. 1913–1915)
- Children: 4
- Relatives: Robert Armstrong (nephew)
- Writing career
- Language: English
- Years active: 1899-1915
- Genre: Melodrama
- Notable works: Salomy Jane, Going Some, Alias Jimmy Valentine, The Deep Purple

Paul Armstrong (April 25, 1869 – August 30, 1915) was an American playwright, whose melodramas provided thrills and comedy to audiences in the first fifteen years of the 20th century. Originally a steamship captain, he went into journalism, became a press agent, then a full time playwright. His period of greatest success was from 1907 through 1911, when his four-act melodramas Salomy Jane (1907), Via Wireless (1908), Going Some (1909), Alias Jimmy Valentine (1909), The Deep Purple (1910), and The Greyhound (1911), had long runs on Broadway and in touring companies. Many of his plays were adapted for silent films between 1914 and 1928.

== Early years ==
Armstrong was born April 25, 1869, in Kidder, Missouri. He was the youngest of three children for Richard Armstrong, an Irish-Canadian sailor, and his wife Harriet. When he was six-months old the family left Missouri, and moved to West Bay City, Michigan where Armstrong grew up and went to school. After high school he took up steam navigation on the Great Lakes, earning his Master's license in 1890. Armstrong acted as manager for a steamship line, and helped skipper their excursion vessels from 1890 to 1895.

== Journalism and press agent ==
Armstrong started newspaper work in spring 1896, supplying special features to The Buffalo Sunday Morning News. By January 1897 he was at the Chicago Herald. He then jumped to the New York Journal, where he wrote about prize-fighting under the byline "Right Cross". Having met an art student named Rella Abell from Kansas City, Armstrong carried on a long-distance courtship when she went to Paris for art school. They became engaged in April 1899, and were married in London during July 1899.

Jim Corbett hired Armstrong as press agent for his brief excursion into baseball. Armstrong had Corbett arrested in Boston during October 1900 for refusing to pay (Note: Newspaper consensus of the time held that Corbett was a notorious deadbeat.) the agreed salary and expenses. After Armstrong's one-act plays were produced in vaudeville, he became press agent for the White Rats of America during their February 1901 strike. He fell out with the White Rats when he tried to lease the Circle Theater in May 1901, and by July was fired.

== Playwriting ==
=== Early works ===
Armstrong's first play was a four-act comic melodrama called Just a Day Dream, produced by William A. Brady. Armstrong had shown it to Joseph Jefferson who suggested some changes. First performed at Boston's Castle Theatre in June 1899, it was revived twice at the same venue. He then wrote a one-act play called My June, that dealt with the ongoing Philippine–American War. It was well-received but commercially unviable for vaudeville. He had more success with a one-act farce, Like Mother Used to Make, which Crimmins and Gore played to good effect.

Armstrong finished the four-act St. Ann by late June 1902. The story concerned Ann Lamont, a bohemian artist from New York who follows her ideal love to the leper colony at Kalawao, Hawaii. Armstrong produced and staged the play, with Barton Pittman from Kirke La Shelle's organization joining as business manager. Armstrong assembled a company for rehearsals in August 1902, with Laura Nelson Hall as lead.

St. Ann opened for a week at the Columbia Theatre in Washington, D.C., on September 1, 1902. It received mixed reviews from critics, but its bookings at Baltimore and Philadelphia went awry, the female lead quit, and thereafter the company performed only a few scattered one-night engagements (Note: A newspaper columnist had suggested this course of events would occur weeks before the play opened. See "The World of Amusement" in The Washington Post of August 17, 1902 on page 28.) before collapsing at Newport News. Pittman claimed that Armstrong's loathing of the Theatrical Syndicate, which controlled bookings, undid their production. The failure led to a brawl in Armstrong's New York office, with Pittman pulling a gun and Armstrong decking him. Armstrong was arrested on an assault charge, which a judge dismissed after hearing about the gun.

=== Rise to fame ===
After the St. Ann failure, Armstrong took on managing the Liberty Theatre, but quit after a season of disappointing productions. Armstrong's one-act play The Blue Grass Handicap was used by Willis P. Sweatnam in vaudeville during 1904. It was a three-character turf racing piece, the lead being played in blackface by a white actor. It was also used as a "curtain-raiser" for Armstrong's new three-act farce. The Superstition of Sue premiered at the Savoy Theatre on April 4, 1904, starring Walter E. Perkins, Wilfred Lucas, and Helen Lackaye. Sue rejects Adrian's proposal, having been made on Friday the 13th. Unwilling to live, Adrian seeks death but fails repeatedly. New York critics were nearly unanimous in panning Sue, with only The Brooklyn Times calling it "interesting". (Note: The Sun called it "drivel", while The Evening World said audience members were gripped by "indecision as to whether they should run shrieking into Thirty-fourth Street or climb up on the stage and kill the performers".) Surprisingly, the production went on to a second week, The Sun speculating the two plays "have been so thoroughly abused that a great many people want to see how bad they are".

The four-act melodrama, The Heir to the Hoorah, premiered April 10, 1905 at the Hudson Theatre. This was Armstrong's first success with a longer work; it ran for 112 performances on Broadway before going on tour. Produced and staged by Kirk La Shelle, its box-office appeal suggested Armstrong's plays were better off being implemented by others. Armstrong was delighted with having written a winner, and even more so when St. Ann, now renamed Ann Lamont, was revived by producer John Cort for Florence Roberts in October 1905.

During March 1906 Armstrong's new four-act Blue Grass (Note: A sequel to events in The Blue Grass Handicap.) was performed in Philadelphia. A horse-racing story, about a Kentucky Colonel fallen on hard times, it had six settings and seven live horses on stage. After a three-week run it was withdrawn, reportedly because the producers wanted to make changes to which Armstrong objected.

=== Broadway ups and downs ===
Producer George C. Tyler of Liebler & Company hired Armstrong in November 1906 to write a play for Eleanor Robson. The resulting Salomy Jane, based on a Bret Harte story, was completed in a week, enabling a premiere at the Liberty Theatre on January 19, 1907. Its 19-week run made it one of the ten most successful plays of the year by the time it closed in May 1907. Armstrong had proven he was more than a one-hit wonder, and for the next seven years would have plays in production every season on Broadway.

Armstrong next wrote the three-act comedy Society and the Bulldog, which was first presented at Albaugh's Theatre in Baltimore, on November 25, 1907. (Note: The play gained notoriety when actress Clara Bloodgood left the matinee performance she was attending, returned to her hotel room and shot herself.) Its Broadway premiere came on January 18, 1908, with Armstrong producing and staging it. The New York Times called the story of a newly rich Nevada miner who tries to buy his daughter a place in New York society "commonplace and uninteresting", while Charles Darnton in The Evening World pointed out failures in casting, settings, and staging that suggested Armstrong had once again taken on too much. Armstrong later recognized as much, saying he had "gone back to being a playwright".

During March and April 1908 Liebler & Company produced tryouts for a new play by Armstrong and Rex Beach called Going Some, but the work, though well-received, was withdrawn over casting issues. In May, Armstrong signed a contract with Klaw and Erlanger to deliver a play called In Time of Peace by September 1, 1908. It was completed a month late, never produced, and later became the subject of a lawsuit as Klaw and Erlanger attempted to get their advance payment to Armstrong returned.

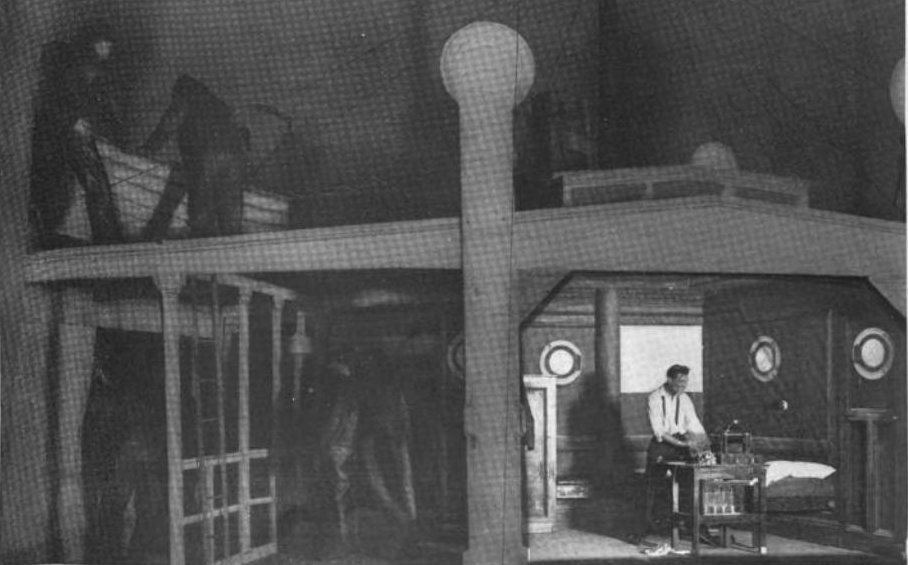
Via Wireless

Frederic Thompson asked Armstrong and Winchell Smith to dramatize an old story of his, which they did in Via Wireless. The plot concerned the sabotage of a new naval artillery gun, and the rescue of passengers from a wrecked yacht using wireless sets during a storm at sea. A four-act melodrama, its first presentation in Washington, D.C. was attended by President Roosevelt. The production premiered on Broadway in November 1908, running through mid-January 1909 before going on tour.

One week after Via Wireless debuted, Armstrong's Blue Grass was given its own Broadway premiere by Liebler & Company at the Majestic Theatre. Armstrong had achieved a rare success in having two of his plays running simultaneously on Broadway. The first night was nearly derailed when feminine lead Irene Moore came down with tonsilitis, but Olive Wyndham learned the role in time. Some rewriting had been done, since the play was now three acts instead of four as in 1906. But Armstrong wasn't through tinkering; after the first week, he added a new character and new scenes. However, the production closed after three weeks, to make way for DeWolf Hopper in The Pied Piper.

The Renegade had been written by Armstrong for actor William Farnum. As Farnum was now under contract to Liebler & Company, they mounted the first production at Chicago's Studebaker Theatre on February 2, 1909. Sub-titled "A Tragi-Comedy in Four Acts", it told the story of a Harvard-educated Native American, whom the US government employs as a bridge to his unpacified tribe, but who falls afoul of a flirtatious white widow. Burns Mantle summed it up: "It is not a well built play", while Charles W. Collins was wholly dismissive of Armstrong's clumsy attempt to dramatize the tragedy of Native Americans. After two weeks the play was withdrawn with the explanation that Armstrong was rewriting it.

=== Heyday ===
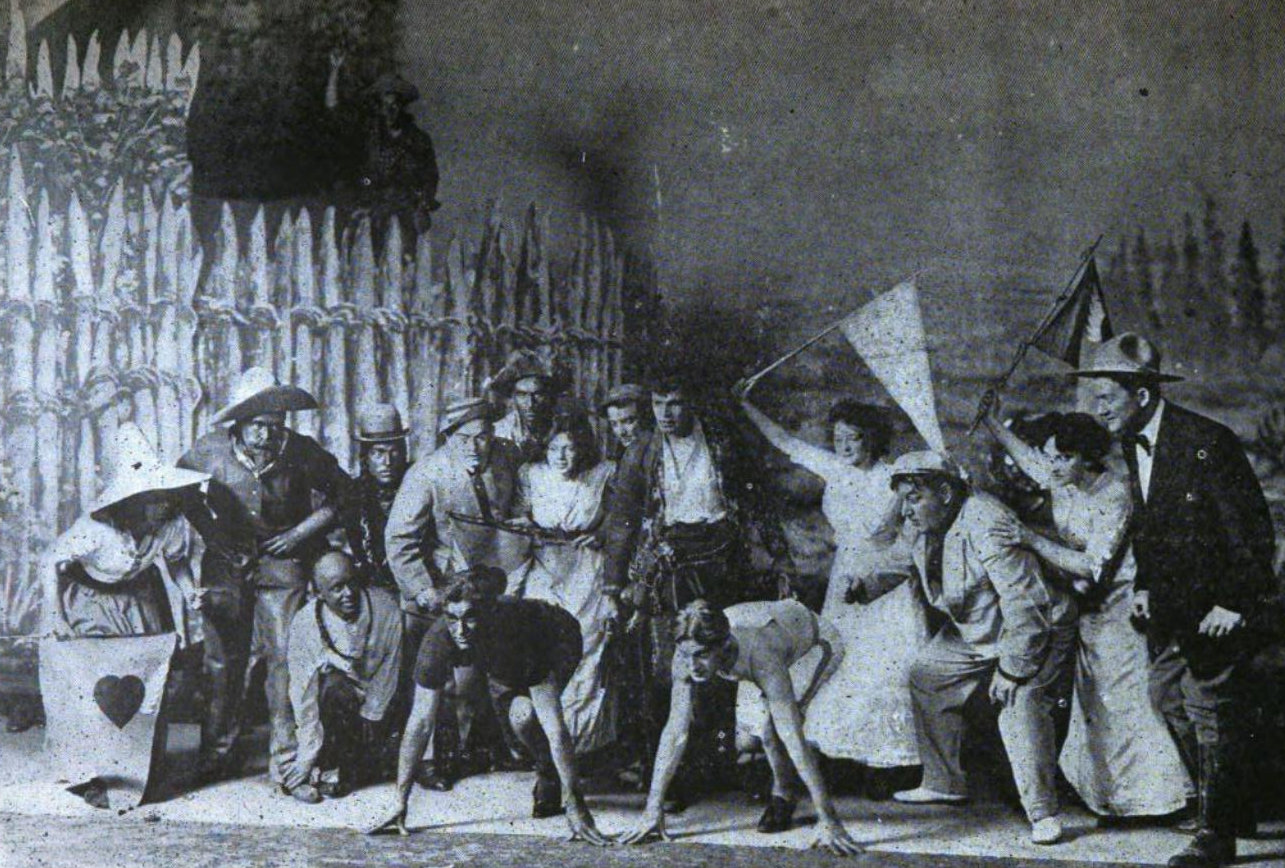
Going Some

By April 12, 1909, Armstrong was back on Broadway with a recast Going Some at the Belasco Theatre. It was an immediate success, and by the end of April the Shuberts, who produced it, announced a second company for Going Some would be formed to present the play on tour. The Broadway production ran for 96 performances until June 26, 1909.

Later that year Armstrong had an even bigger hit with Alias Jimmy Valentine, which opened in Chicago on Christmas night starring H. B. Warner and Laurette Taylor. Liebler & Company, who had commissioned it based on an O. Henry short story, moved the production to Broadway's Wallack's Theatre on January 21, 1910. It ran there for five months, closing June 11, 1910. Alias Jimmy Valentine was Armstrong's most lasting legacy: it had a brief Broadway revival starting December 8, 1921, at the Gaiety Theatre, was adapted for motion pictures in 1915, 1920, 1928, 1936 and 1942, was adapted into a radio program during 1938–1939, and adapted into a radio episode of CBS Radio Mystery Theater as Jimmy Valentine's Gamble on January 16, 1977.

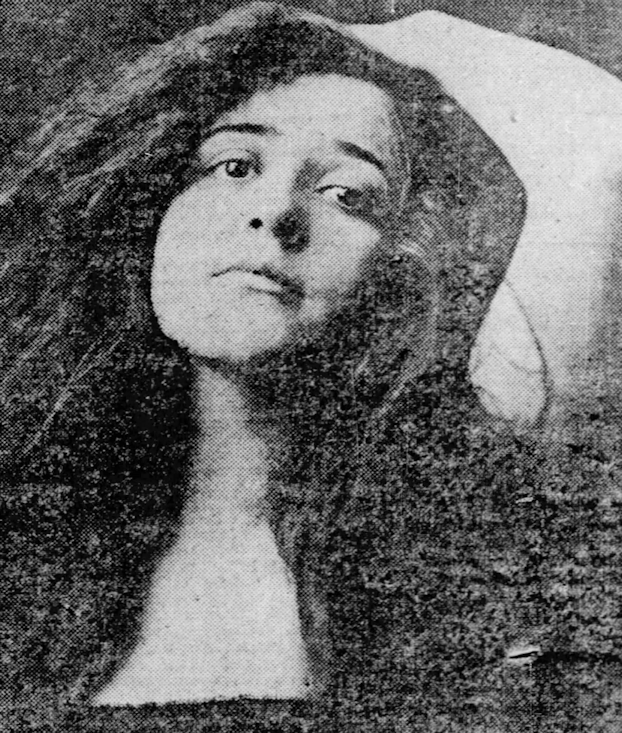
Catherine Calvert

The first of two successful collaborations with Wilson Mizner, The Deep Purple was also the last Paul Armstrong play produced by Liebler & Company. (Note: George C. Tyler was the only producer to work more than once with Armstrong.) It also marked the start of a personal crisis, as Armstrong's marriage began to unravel over his obsession with actress Catherine Calvert, an Armstrong discovery. After a tryout in Rochester, the play had an open engagement in Chicago at the Princess Theatre starting October 3, 1910, with Richard Bennett as the lead. The play ran fourteen weeks in Chicago, before moving to Broadway on January 9, 1911, at the Lyric Theatre. The Deep Purple closed May 20, 1911, after 152 (Note: The total includes a matinee and evening performance on the final day.) performances.

The Greyhound was the second collaboration between Armstrong and Mizner. Written in 1911, it was produced by the Wagenhals & Kemper Company. After a January 1912 tryout in Indianapolis, and an open run in Chicago, its Broadway premiere came on February 29, 1912, at the Astor Theatre. It ran for 112 performances, closing on June 1, 1912.

With The Greyhound, Armstrong had four straight successes on Broadway; their touring companies joined those of Salomy Jane, The Heir to the Hoorah, and Via Wireless which were still playing on the road, as were his one-act plays for vaudville. The most prominent of the latter was A Romance of the Underworld, which had three scenes and 23 speaking parts; it premiered at the Fifth Avenue Theatre on March 27, 1911. It was later made into a silent film in 1918, and Romance of the Underworld in 1928.

=== Later works ===
Armstrong didn't use Catherine Calvert in The Greyhound, but in September 1913 he made her the star of The Escape in its Broadway premiere. He had once again decided to produce and stage his own work, despite his dismal record in doing so. The New York Times reviewer said "Mr. Armstrong appears to be the sort of playwright who when he does go wrong covers the whole distance", while Calvert's performance was that of "a carefully drilled amateur". The Escape closed after two weeks.

Rella Abell Armstrong, who had discontinued her initial suit for divorce, now won a final decree in December 1913, giving her custody of their three young daughters and $7,500 annual support. Ten days later Armstrong married Calvert in New Haven, Connecticut.

During September 1914 Armstrong produced and staged his new work, The Bludgeon, another four-act melodrama. It starred Maude Hanaford and premiered on Broadway at Maxine Elliott's Theatre. The Standard Union called it "a disappointment", with "an unwholesome theme" and characters who were either "vicious" or "weaklings". It also closed after two weeks, just weeks before another new Armstrong play, The Heart of a Thief premiered at the Hudson Theatre on October 5, 1914. This was produced by Charles Frohman and starred Martha Hedman. The New York Times called it "tiresome", while The Sun said of the play's run "The end cannot be far off".

Armstrong's final work was a one-act play called The Bank's Half Million, written and performed for the first time during July 1915, which featured his nephew, Robert Armstrong.

== Personal character ==
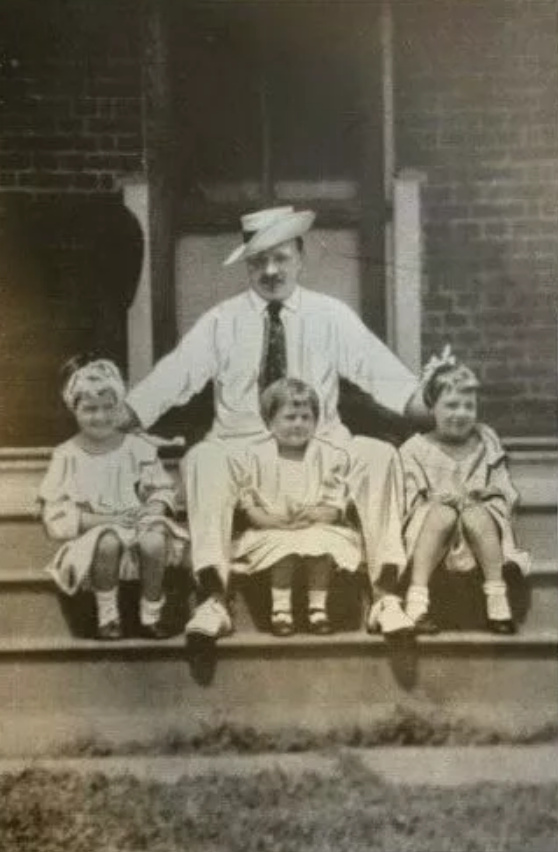
Armstrong with his daughters

A journalist interviewed Armstrong at his home "Acton Manor" in Annapolis during summer 1907. They noted his great interest in horses, of which he had several in his stables. He also had a dock and boathouse on the river where he tinkered with marine engines.

H. L. Mencken said in 1908 that "In spite of his train robber aspect... Paul Armstrong is the gentlest of men. I have seen him moved to tears by a Kipling ballad, and his worse vice is an indecent passion for shelled walnuts".

Charles W. Collins wrote a profile of Armstrong for The Green Book Magazine in April 1914. He described Armstrong as having "a personality which stands out in any kind of company... A bull-dog tenacity of purpose, a truculence in demanding punctilious observance of his rights, and a sardonic humor are the traits written on his face". Collins also said of Armstrong: "His talk is pungent and picturesque; he has a wealth of fascinating anecdote about things seen and heard in the rough romantic world; and his humor is often grim".

Producer George C. Tyler of Liebler & Company mentioned three personal traits of Paul Armstrong: an ability to write plays in a speedy manner, a fondness for making curtain speeches, and a tendency to stop speaking with someone after a disagreement. On at least three occasions Armstrong was formally charged with assault over theatrical disputes: by business manager Barton Pittman, by reporter Henry M. Friend, and by actor James Young.

== Death and legacy ==
Armstrong was treated for heart trouble at Johns Hopkins Hospital in Baltimore in spring 1915. On August 30, 1915, he had gone with two friends to Penn Station in Manhattan to greet his wife and young son, back from a visit to her mother in Baltimore. On the journey home to Park Avenue from the station, he fell ill in Central Park. After arriving home, two doctors were summoned, but Armstrong was soon pronounced dead. Newspaper obits reported the cause as heart disease. His funeral service was held at his home, with just family and a few others in attendance, among whom were Rex Beach and Wilson Mizner, the latter having escaped from a sanitorium a few weeks earlier.

The New York Times said that as a playwright Armstrong "was unusually successful, and many of his plays enjoyed long runs. Starting with 1907, there was seldom a season that one of his plays was not running at a New York theatre". The Boston Globe described him as "one of the prominent figures on the American stage during the last ten years". Motion picture producers found enough potential in his plays to serve as the basis for films made years after his death. From a more distant vantage, Alan Havig in the Dictionary of Missouri Biography said of him: "A financially successful storyteller, Armstrong wrote nothing of permanent importance".

== Plays ==
Dates reflect the year of first performance, or if unproduced the year of writing. The phrase "with" identifies a collaborator in the writing.

- Just a Day Dream (1899)
- My June (1900)
- Like Mother Used to Make (1901)
- St. Ann aka Ann Lamont (1902)
- The Blue Grass Handicap (1904)
- The Superstition of Sue (1904)
- The Heir to the Hoorah (1904)
- Under the Green Lamps aka A Night in a Police Station (1904) with Newton M. Macmillan: One-act play for a NY police band benefit.
- Laska aka Lasca (1905) Unproduced play about Texas and Mexico.
- Blue Grass (1905)
- In a Blaze of Glory (1906) One-act play written for Nat Goodwin.
- The Man from the West (1906) One-act play.
- Salomy Jane (1907)
- Society and the Bulldog (1907)
- The Renegade (1908)
- Going Some (1908) with Rex Beach.
- In Time of Peace (1908) Unproduced four-act play about the US Navy.
- Via Wireless (1908) with Winchell Smith
- The Terrorist (1909) Unproduced; an unsuccessful attempt by Armstrong to placate Klaw and Erlanger over In Time of Peace.
- Trimmed (1909) One-act play for vaudeville
- Alias Jimmy Valentine (1909)
- The Deep Purple (1910) with Wilson Mizner
- A Romance of the Underworld (1911) One-act play.
- The Greyhound (1911) with Wilson Mizner
- The Escape (1913)
- Woman Proposes (1913) One-act satire on women proposing marriage to men.
- The Bludgeon (1914)
- The Heart of a Thief (1914)
- The Bank's Half Million (1915) One-act play with seven characters.

== Films based on Armstrong plays ==
- The Greyhound (1914) - Silent film produced by the Life Photo Film Corporation.
- The Escape (1914)
- Salomy Jane (1914)
- Alias Jimmy Valentine (1915)
- The Deep Purple (1915)
- Via Wireless (1915)
- The Heir to the Hoorah (1916)
- A Romance of the Underworld (1918)
- Going Some (1920)
- The Deep Purple (1920)
- Alias Jimmy Valentine (1920)
- Salomy Jane (1923)
- Paths to Paradise (1925)
- Romance of the Underworld (1928)
- Alias Jimmy Valentine (1928)
- The Affairs of Jimmy Valentine (1942)
- Hold That Blonde! (1945)

== Bibliography ==
- George C. Tyler and J. C. Furnas. Whatever Goes Up. Bobbs Merrill, 1934.
- Lawrence O. Christensen, William E. Foley, Gary R. Kremer, and Kenneth H. Winn, eds. Dictionary of Missouri Biography. University of Missouri Press, 1999.
- Court of Appeals of the State of New York, Marc Klaw and Abraham L. Erlanger, plaintiffs, against Paul Armstrong, defendant, 1912.
