= Salomy Jane (play) =

1907 play by Paul Armstrong

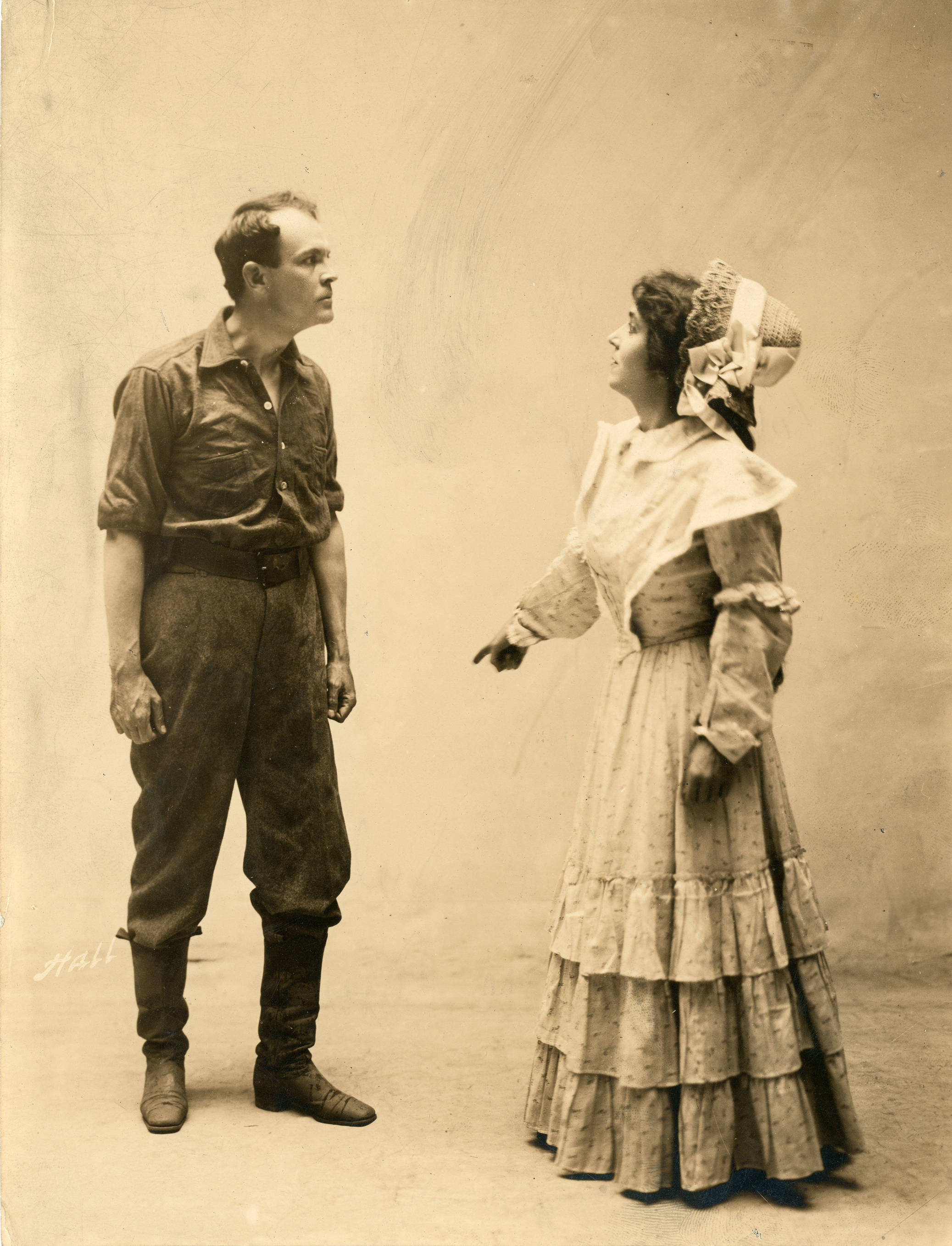
- Original language: English
- Written by: Paul Armstrong
- Based on: Salomy Jane's Kiss (1889) by Bret Harte
- Music by: Robert Hood Bowers
- Subject: Romance amidst the Redwoods
- Genre: Melodrama
- Setting: Calaveras County, California circa 1855

Premiere
- Date: January 19, 1907
- Place: Liberty Theatre
- Directed by: Hugh Ford

Salomy Jane, is a 1907 play by Paul Armstrong. It was loosely based on the short story Salomy Jane's Kiss by Bret Harte, but also pulled in characters from other Harte works. It has four acts and five scenes, taking place over sixteen hours in Calaveras County, California around 1855.

The play was produced by Liebler & Company, with staging by Hugh Ford, sets by Gates and Morange, incidental music by Robert Hood Bowers, and electrical effects by the Kliegl Brothers. It starred Eleanor Robson, with H. B. Warner, Holbrook Blinn, and Ada Dwyer. It ran on Broadway from January through May 1907, returned in September 1907 for a month then went on tour.

Paul Armstrong later expanded his drama into a screenplay for a 1914 silent film.

== Characters ==
Lead

- Salomy Jane Clay is a proud young woman with a cool manner towards suitors.
- The Man is a young stranger who has come to the camp to avenge a woman. (Note: The original Bret Harte story revealed his name to be Jack Dart.)

Supporting

- Colonel Starbottle is a Kentucky Colonel, a Bret Harte character from other stories.
- Yuba Bill is another Bret Harte stock character, a rambunctious stage driver.
- Jack Marbury is a third Bret Harte stock character (Jack Hamlin in other stories), a gambler.
- Rufe Waters is a young stockman interested in Salomy Jane who fails to show mettle.

Featured

- Madison Clay is Salomy Jane's widower father, a stockraiser from Kentucky with a quarter section of land.
- Phil Larrabee is an enemy of Madison Clay who has carried a feud from their Kentucky home.
- Red Pete Heath is a good-for-nothing drunken husband who turns to stagecoach robbery.
- Seth Low is the "Sheriff", leader of the vigilantes.
- Willie Smith is about 10, antecedents unclear, who wants to become a stage driver like Yuba Bill.
- Lize Heath is Red Pete's long-suffering wife and mother of his two girls.
- Mary Ann Heath is about 8, the older daughter of Lize Heath and Red Pete, friend to Willie Smith.
- Anna May Heath is about 6, the younger daughter of Lize Heath and Red Pete.

Walk-on

- Vigilantes

Off-stage

- Baldwin betrayed the Man's sister, and later accosted Salomy Jane.

== Synopsis ==
The play was never published; this synopsis is based on newspaper reviews from 1907.

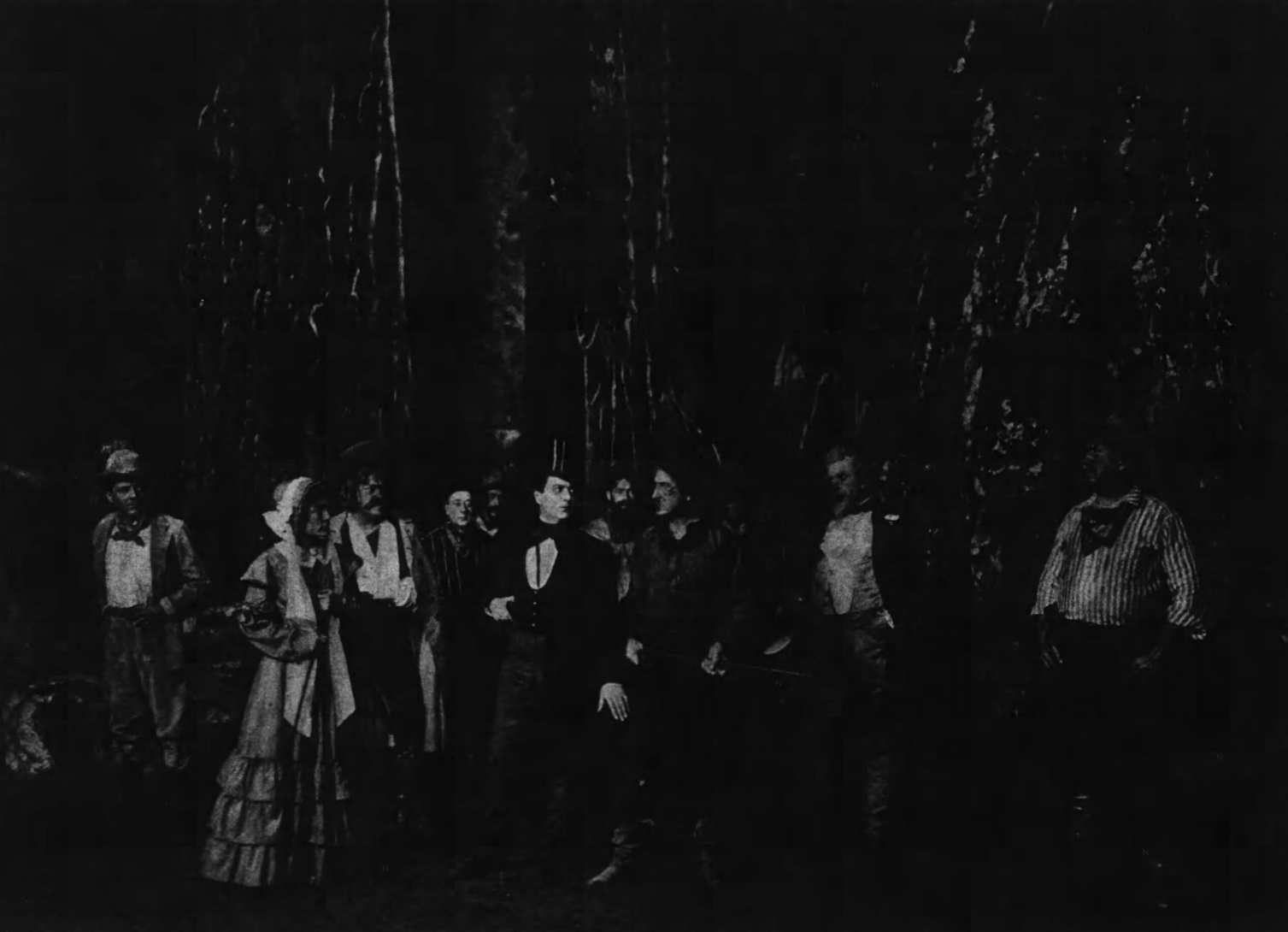

Act I (Afternoon, meeting place of the Vigilantes in the Redwoods.) The vigilantes have called a meeting about some stagecoach robbers that held up and wounded Yuba Bill. At the meeting Larrabee and Madison Clay confront each other, but are separated and warned by Seth Low not to start a feud in California. Salomy Jane urges would-be beau Rufe Waters to avenge her honor upon Baldwin, but he hesitates. Later Baldwin is found dead, and Rufe secretly tells Salomy Jane that he slew him. She then allows him to put a ring on her finger. Anna May wanders in with a bangle that Yuba Bill recognizes from the robbery. The vigilantes now know they are hunting Red Pete. As they go out, Salomy Jane encounters the Man, and learns he was avenging his sister when he slew Baldwin. She brings him food and lets him go.

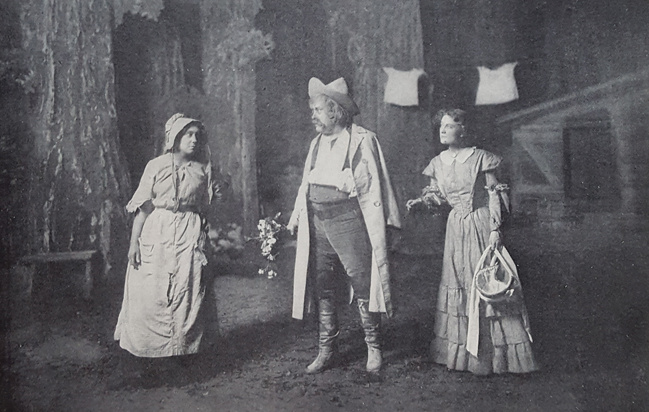

Act II (Evening, exterior of Red Pete's shack.) Yuba Bill tells Lize Heath that her husband Red Pete was one of the robbers who held up his stagecoach. Yuba Bill figures that means Red Pete will be abandoning her, since he is known to the vigilantes. But the vigilantes bring Red Pete and the young Man, who was also caught, into the clearing, so Pete can say goodbye to his family. Lize, despite Red's abuse of her, rails against vigilante justice until Pete stops her. Both men are to be hung for robbery, but Pete says the Man had nothing to with it. The vigilantes start to free him, when Rufe accuses him of Baldwin's murder. They decide to hang him, and Seth Low invites Salomy Jane to say goodbye to the young fellow who has no one else. Salomy Jane, impressed by the Man's stoicism and sense of honor, kisses him in front of the gathering. As they depart with their captives, Jack Marbury quietly slips some gold coins into Lize's apron while she sobs unaware.

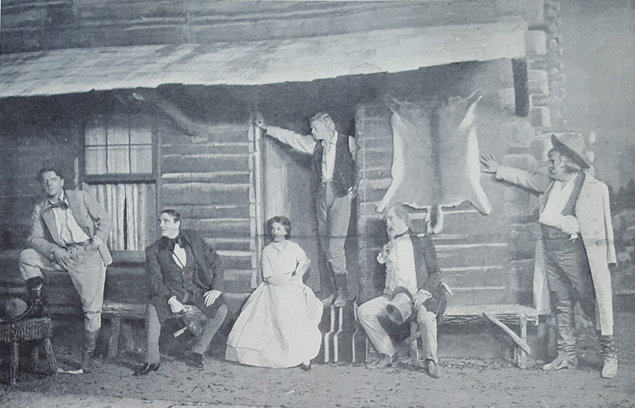

Act III (Night, exterior of Madison Clay's home.) Returning home, Salomy Jane and her father learn Red Pete was hung, but the young stranger escaped. Col. Starbottle warns Madison that Larrabee is goning to ambush him. Starbottle, like Yuba Bill and Jack Marbury, are all trying to court Salomy Jane. She fends off the older men with humor, and tells Jack Marbury she likes but doesn't love him. However, she is scathing with Rufe when he reproaches her for kissing the Man: "When you hang, I'll kiss you too". Later, Salomy is awakened by a noise outside the cabin. Taking her father's shotgun with her in case its Larrabee, she finds the Man. He tells Salomy Jane he's come back to thank her. When Rufe comes by, stalking the Man, Salomy disguises him with her father's hat and duster. The disguise doesn't fool Jack Marbury, who holds the Man at gunpoint. Salomy Jane persuades Jack to let him go.

Act IV (Scene 1: Dawn, same as Act III.) Larrabee, mistaking the Man for Madison Clay tries to shoot him, but is himself shot by the Man using Madison's shotgun. Roused by the shots, neighbors come running. Salomy tries to hide the gun, but Madison see her with it and tells everyone he shot Larrabee. Soon Madison, Salomy, and the Man are all fugitives. Madison leads the vigilantes in one direction, to give Salomy time to get a horse.

(Scene 2: Dawn, at the Corral of Madison Clay.) At the corral Salomy Jane tells the Man to pick out a horse for their escape. They are caught by Rufe, who holds them at gunpoint. The Man calls Rufe's bluff, knowing he doesn't have to nerve to fire. He further frightens Rufe by saying he'll strangle him like he did Baldwin. Rufe fades away and the couple make their escape. (Curtain)

== Original production ==
=== Background ===
Liebler & Company was a partnership between investor Theodore A. Liebler and producer-manager George C. Tyler. After Robson's success in Merely Mary Ann, they leased the Liberty Theatre for the 1906–1907 season, in order to showcase her in several new plays. These were Nurse Marjorie by Israel Zangwill; Susan in Search of a Husband by Eugene Presbray, based on a Jerome K. Jerome story; (Note: This was double-billed with a one-act play, A Tenement Tragedy by Clotilde Graves, written especially for Eleanor Robson.) and The Girl Who Has Everything by Clyde Fitch. According to Tyler's 1934 memoir, none of the three was very successful, so he commissioned Paul Armstrong to write another. Armstrong completed Salomy Jane in one week.

=== Cast ===
Principal cast during the original Broadway run.
Role	Actor	Dates	Notes and sources
Salomy Jane	Eleanor Robson	Jan 19, 1907 - May 18, 1907	
The Man	H. B. Warner	Jan 19, 1907 - May 18, 1907	The day after the play closed Warner married Mrs. Fred R. Hamlin, widow of a theatrical manager.
Col. Starbottle	Reuban Fax	Jan 19, 1907 - May 18, 1907	
Yuba Bill	Ralph Delmore	Jan 19, 1907 - May 18, 1907	
Jack Marbury	Holbrook Blinn	Jan 19, 1907 - May 18, 1907	
Rufe Waters	Earl Browne	Jan 19, 1907 - May 18, 1907	
Madison Clay	James Seeley	Jan 19, 1907 - May 18, 1907	
Phil Larrabee	Henry Harmon	Jan 19, 1907 - May 18, 1907	
Red Pete	Stephen Wright	Jan 19, 1907 - May 18, 1907	
Seth Low	Hoarce Vinton	Jan 19, 1907 - May 18, 1907	
Willie Smith	Donald Gallaher	Jan 19, 1907 - May 18, 1907	Gallaher, age 11, told an interviewer he wanted to be a civil engineer, not an actor.
Lize Heath	Ada Dwyer	Jan 19, 1907 - May 18, 1907	
Mary Ann Heath	Frances Golden Fuller	Jan 19, 1907 - May 18, 1907	Fuller, about 10 years old during the production, had memorized all of Eleanor Robson's lines.
Anna May Heath	Ruth Abbott Wells	Jan 19, 1907 - May 18, 1907	

=== Premiere and reception ===
The play had no tryouts; its first public performance was its Broadway premiere at the Liberty Theatre on January 19, 1907. This was a Saturday, so the producers announced ahead of time there would be no matinee that day. (Note: In Broadway theaters, Wednesdays and Saturdays were the traditional days for matinees.) Eleanor Robson had top billing. Producer Tyler said the premiere was nearly derailed when playwright Paul Armstrong became tipsy on champagne and gave a third act curtain speech. (Note: A traditional prerogative of playwrights at this time, which fell out of fashion after 1910.) Armstrong gave the audience a narcissistic version of the play's writing that had the first-nighters starting to snicker, but redeemed himself by abruptly ending the speech proclaiming he owed it all "to the great soul of Bret Harte".

The New York Times critic thought the first two acts went smoothly, but the melodrama lost its punch in the third through obviousness, while the fourth act was weak. The Brooklyn Daily Eagle reviewer singled out the playwright's use of a backstory in the first act to explain Salomy Jane's reason for kissing the stranger. They also cited the playwrights characterization, saying the play "is melodrama with human beings in it instead of theatrical stock figures".

One month after the premiere, The Brooklyn Times reported "attendance at the Liberty Theatre is nightly increasing and seats are already at a premium". Beginning February 27, 1907, Wednesday matinees at the Liberty Theatre were devoted to a revival of Merely Mary Ann, with Eleanor Robson and Ada Dwyer reprising their roles in that 1903 hit, and H. B. Warner playing the male lead.

These matinees led to a minor contremps when Paul Armstrong protested the playing of Merely Mary Ann in conjunction with Salomy Jane, claiming long tradition would ascribe weakness to a new work if an older play supported it. George C. Tyler replied that Armstrong's contract with Liebler & Company was for an indefinite period and the playwright couldn't expect Miss Robson to go on playing Salomy Jane forever and nothing else.

=== Closing ===
The initial Broadway run of Salomy Jane finished at the Liberty Theatre on May 18, 1907. It would return September 2, 1907 as the first of several works in repertory, previous hits of Eleanor Robson such as Merely Mary Ann and Nurse Marjorie.

== Adaptations ==
=== Film ===
- Salomy Jane (1914)
- Salomy Jane (1923)
- Wild Girl (1932)

== Bibliography ==
- George C. Tyler and J. C. Furnas. Whatever Goes Up. Bobbs Merrill, 1934.
