= Historical pageant =

Form of historical drama

Poster for the Pageant of Empire at the British Empire Exhibition. A scene featuring Queen Elizabeth I is shown.

A historical pageant is a form of historic theatre which recounts, in a series of separate scenes, the history of a specific geographic area, a city, settlement, or country. They were a common form of popular cultural and historical engagement in local communities, particularly in Edwardian Britain. Largely popularised by Louis N. Parker, the form took elements from medieval pageants and the chronicle plays popular in Elizabethan times. The term is also used critically to describe films of similar format.

== History ==
=== Emergence ===
Pageants of the late 19th-century in England consisted largely of costumed celebrations, with the Lord Mayor's Show a prime example, but did not generally have a historical aspect to them. Centenary celebrations had also emerged as a popular form of public entertainment and engagement with history. The Alfred Millenary, celebrations to mark the 1000th anniversary of King Alfred's death in Winchester a notable example.

Louis N. Parker who popularised the modern form of the historical pageant based them largely on the Medieval pageant, a form of procession which was often used as a dramatic retelling of history with both secular and historical themes. Parker's pageants focused more on a secular narratives, although they remained dramatic retelling of history. The format was also notably different in generally omitting the processional nature of the medieval pageant, which was one of its key features. In format it was perhaps more similar to the chronicle plays popular in Elizabethan England.

=== Development ===
Cover of an album for the Sherborne Pageant of 1905, the first of its kind

Parker held his seminal Sherborne Pageant in 1905, which brought immediate popularity and interest in pageants. In the following years, Parker was asked to organise others in Warwick (1906), Bury St Edmunds (1907), Dover (1908), Colchester (1909) and York (1909). Parker was not the sole proprietor of the form however, with Frank Lascelles, another prominent pageant master, staging his first pageant in Oxford in 1907. Pageants became popular attractions which brought great crowds, including audiences from across the British Empire and visitors from the United States of America. The Oxford Pageant for example was lauded in the American press, and Mark Twain, who had been in attendance, stated that "it was worth crossing the Atlantic again and again to see it". Lascelles' style, characterised by symbolism and allegory was much more adaptable to the wishes of American pageant masters, with his pageant for the Quebec Tercentenary deemed by them the pinnacle of the form. Lascelles also went on to be known for his staging of pageants with imperial themes, such as his 1911 Pageant of London for the Festival of Empire. For this he came to be known as the "man who staged the Empire". Most pageants however remained focused on local or at most national history in their character and scope.

The period after their Edwardian nascency saw a divergence of the forms and purposes of the pageants, imperial pageants being one such example. The First World War also saw the emergence of peace pageants, and pageants began being held for more explicitly political purposes, including the 1934 Pageant of Parliament and those held by the League of Nations and Women's Institute. Historical pageants also spread more broadly throughout the world.

=== Popularity ===
From their inception, historical pageants were a particularly popular form of engagement with visual culture in the first half the 20th century, with times of peak popularity coining the terms "pageant fever" or "pageantitis". This was particularly used to describe their height in the Edwardian period, although they remained popular until at least the Second World War. Pageants could often involve large numbers of performers, the original Sherborne Pageant had 800, but the 1911 Pageant of London had 15,000, consisting of volunteers from every borough of London as well as representatives from the colonies. Viewership was also extensive, 50,000 attended the Sherborne Pageant, while the Pageant of Empire at the 1924 Empire Exhibition was seen by at least a million total audience members. The significance of such events meant they were rarely performed more than once in a generation in the same place.

Performances were also incredibly widespread within the United Kingdom, with a 2016 study suggesting that "practically every town and city" as well as a great number of smaller community institutions held historical pageants in the 20th century. Their popular engagement was a sort of performed heritage which aimed to bring together the community of which they told the history. Notable examples are also seen throughout the British Empire which attempt to encourage a deeper affinity with the metropole, such as the celebrations of the centenary of South Australia in 1936, where a pageant involving 13,000 schoolchildren was held. In America, attempts to create a single unifying narrative which was coherent and inclusive was a particular challenge, leading to individual pageants by Irish, Jewish and African-American communities. Viva! El Paso is a notable modern example of the form in Texas. The popularity of historical pageants gradually diminished over the course of the 20th century, more readily outside the United Kingdom than within.

== In popular culture ==
Novels which include scenes of pageants include:

- More William by Richmal Crompton (1922)
- William the Outlaw by Richmal Crompton (1927)
- Mapp & Lucia by E. F. Benson (1931)
- Murder at the Pageant by Victor L. Whitechurch (1930)
- The Man Without a Face by Clifton Robbins (1932)
- Between the Acts by Virginia Woolf (1941)
- Party Shoes by Noel Streatfield (1948)
- Festival at Farbridge by J. B. Priestly (1951)
- Dragon in Danger by Rosemary Manning (1959)

== See also ==
- Medieval pageant
- History (theatrical genre)
- Historical drama
