= Pageant of London =

Historical pageant of the Festival of Empire

Coordinates: 51.424563°N 0.070434°W

Programme for the Pageant of London

The Pageant of London was a historical pageant held as part of the Festival of Empire around the Crystal Palace in 1911. A successful and widely advertised attraction of the event, it was held beyond its originally expected run . It was staged by Pageant Master Frank Lascelles, a prolific organiser of historical pageants, sometimes known as the "man who staged the Empire".

== Background ==
Historical pageants, a form of dramatic theatre based on Medieval pageants, had largely been popularised in Britain by Louis Napoleon Parker, who held a number of historical pageants for cities and towns in the early 20th century. The Pageant of London was devised as a similar pageant for the history of London, but was affected by its association with the Festival of Empire, and Frank Lascalles the Pageant Master who came to be known for his Pageants of Empire.

== Description ==
The pageant served as an attraction for the festival, as well as a celebration of the "magnificence, glory and honour of the Empire and the Mother Country". It involved scenes representing the history of Britain, with specially modelled sets provided by prominent architects such as Edward Poynter and Aston Webb. Advertised as "2,000 years of History Visualised", it covered British history from pre-Roman times up to the present day. The festival opened on the 12th of may with the first performance held on the 8th of June. They were originally intended to finish in July, but were continued due to their popularity and ran until the 2nd of September.

=== Music ===
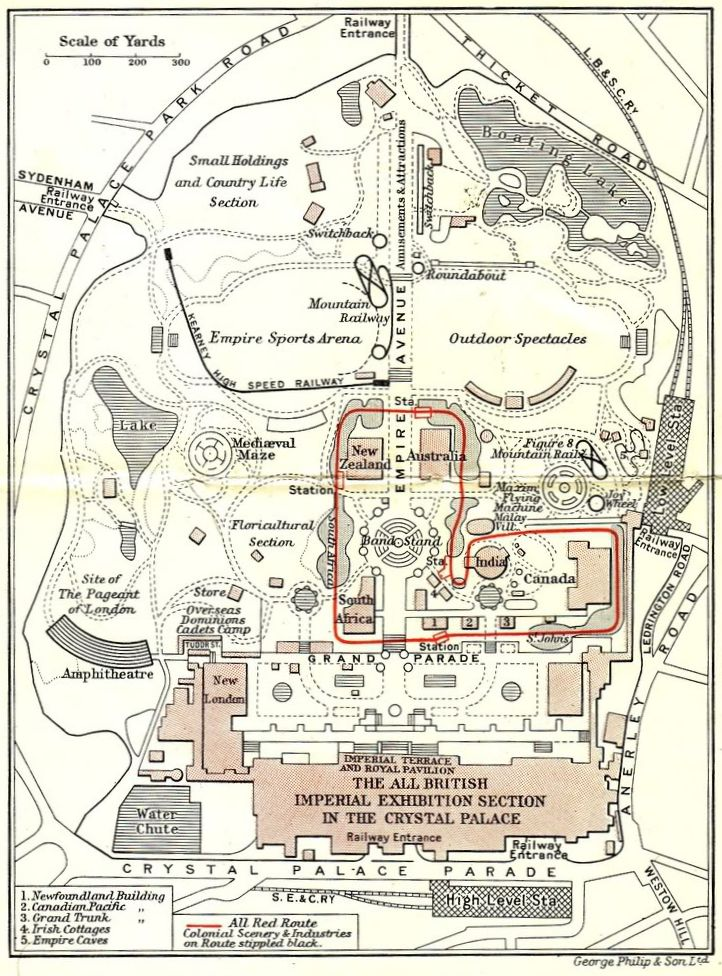
Map of the Festival of Empire, with the site of the Pageant of Empire on the left

The accompanying music was directed by W. H. Bell, with a number of prolific composers of the day contributing. Music was provided for the pageant by composers including Ralph Vaughan Williams, Gustav Holst, Frank Bridge, Cecil Forsyth, Henry Balfour Gardiner, Edward German, John Blackwood McEwen and Haydn Wood. Many of the composers were of a newer generation of British musicians, and a number focused on patriotic music which was noted by an observer to have only recently come to such popularity.

=== Programme ===
The pageant was held where the Concert Bowl now stands in Crystal Palace Park. It involved four parts each run on a separate day. The first three parts drew on volunteer actors from all the boroughs of London, with the total number of costumed actors numbering 15,000. The fourth part was dedicated to the connection of London with the rest of the British Empire. The final scene, the Masque Imperial, was "An Allegory of the Advantages of Empire" and represented a climax of the entire pageant. In it, the Genius of the World addresses Britannia and describing her duty to the Empire and the world. Britannia is then declared worthy of celebration by the "Pageant of the Gain of Empire" where the performers of all parts process into the Temple. The Masque was scripted by Francis H. Markoe and the music composed by Frederick Corder. Corder provided a version of Rule, Britannia! to the Pageant of the Gain of Empire.

Scene list:

Part I

- Scene I. The Dawn of British History. Primitive London
- Scene II. Roman London. The Triumph of Carausius
- Scene III. King Alfred and London
- Scene IV. Danish Invasion
- Scene V. The Norman Conquest
- Scene VI. Return of Richard I
- Scene VII. Edward I and Dreams of Unity
- Scene VIII. Days of Chivalry. Tournament in Smithfield

Part II

- Scene I. The Age of Chaucer
- Scene II. Return of Henry V after Agincourt
- Scene III. The Passing of Medievalism
- Scene IV. Early Discoveries
- Scene V. Merrie England. May Day Revels
- Scene VI. Field of the Cloth of Gold. English side
- Scene VII. The Spacious Days of Queen Elizabeth

Part III

- Scene I. Eastward and Westward Ho
- Scene II. Meeting of the Old World and the New
- Scene III. The Fall of the Monarchy
- Scene IV. The Restoration
- Scene V. A Mourning Triumph
- Scene VI. Old Customs and New Adventures
- Scene VII. The Great War

Part IV

- Scene I. Newfoundland. Landing of Sir Humphrey Gilbert
- Scene II. Australia. Capt. Cook lands in Botany Bay
- Scene III. South Africa
- Scene IV. New Zealand
- Scene V. Canada
- Scene VI. India
- The Masque Imperial

== See also ==
- Pageant of Empire
- Warwick Pageant
