= Drake of England (play) =

Play by Louis N. Parker

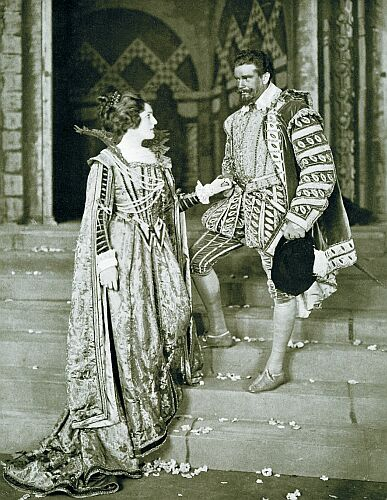
- Amy Brandon Thomas and Lyn Harding
- Written by: Louis N. Parker
- Original language: English
- Genre: Historical

Premiere
- Date premiered: 3 September 1912
- Place premiered: His Majesty's Theatre, London

Drake of England is a British play by Louis N. Parker which was first staged in 1912. It is a pageant-like work celebrating the career of the Elizabethan sailor Sir Francis Drake, particularly his role in the defeat of the Armada of 1588. It was originally written for Sir Herbert Tree to play the role of Drake. It ran for 221 performances at His Majesty's Theatre in London's West End, produced by Herbert Tree. The cast included Lyn Harding as Drake, and also featured Philip Merivale and Phyllis Neilson-Terry, Amy Brandon Thomas.

== Adaptation ==
In 1935 the play served as the basis for the film Drake of England, directed by Arthur B. Woods and starring Matheson Lang as Drake.

== Bibliography ==
- Richards, Jeffrey. The Age of the Dream Palace: Cinema and Society in 1930s Britain. I.B. Tauris, 2010.
