= Frank Lascelles =

Frank Lascelles may refer to:

- Frank Lascelles (diplomat) (1841–1920), British diplomat
- Frank Lascelles (pageant master) (1875–1934), British pageant master
