= Drake of England =

1935 British film by Arthur B. Woods

- Directed by: Arthur B. Woods
- Written by: Marjorie Deans; Clifford Grey; Ákos Tolnay; Norman Watson
- Based on: Drake of England by Louis N. Parker
- Produced by: Walter C. Mycroft
- Starring: Matheson Lang; Athene Seyler; Jane Baxter; Henry Mollison
- Cinematography: Claude Friese-Greene; Ronald Neame
- Edited by: Edward B. Jarvis
- Music by: G. H. Clutsam; Idris Lewis
- Production company: British International Pictures
- Distributed by: Wardour Films
- Release date: 16 May 1935
- Running time: 99 minutes
- Country: United Kingdom
- Language: English

Drake of England is a 1935 British drama film directed by Arthur B. Woods and starring Matheson Lang, Athene Seyler and Jane Baxter. It depicts the life of Francis Drake and the events leading up to the defeat of the Armada in 1588.

== Plot ==
In 1567, Francis Drake and his cousin John Hawkins set sail from Plymouth, watched by Elizabeth Sydenham, soon to be a lady-in-waiting to Queen Elizabeth. The following year, the queen is most displeased when Drake brings news that the expedition to the West Indies has ended in disaster, a venture in which the queen's own ship, the Jesus of Lubeck, has been captured. Drake reports that their trading was successful, but then a Spanish fleet, commanded by Don Enriquez, sailed into the harbor. Despite assurances that the English would be left alone, the following day, the Spanish attacked without warning and captured the treasure the English had earned. Drake recommends they recoup their losses by seizing Spanish ships forced into Plymouth to shelter from French privateers, ships which carry King Philip II of Spain's bullion. Elizabeth enthusiastically accepts his proposal, and also does not oppose his plan to attack Nombre de Dios, where treasure from the New World is gathered to send to Spain. After the queen departs, Elizabeth Sydenham introduces herself to Drake ...

== Cast ==
- Matheson Lang as Francis Drake
- Athene Seyler as Queen Elizabeth
- Jane Baxter as Elizabeth Sydenham
- Henry Mollison as John Doughty
- Donald Wolfit as Thomas Doughty
- George Merritt as Tom Moone
- Amy Veness as Mother Moone
- Ben Webster as Lord Burghley
- Sam Livesey as Sir George Sydenham
- Margaret Halstan as Lady Sydenham (credited as Margaret Halston)
- Charles Quatermaine as Parson Fletcher (as Charles Quartermaine)
- Allan Jeayes as Don Bernardino
- Gibb McLaughlin as Don Enriquez
- Helen Haye as Lady Lennox
- Arthur Goullet as Pedro (as Arthur Goulett)
- George Moore-Marriott as Bright

== Production ==
The film was made at Elstree Studios, as part of the boom in historical films that followed the global success of The Private Life of Henry VIII. The film was based on the play of the same title by Louis N. Parker. The art direction was by Duncan Sutherland who designed the film's sets. It was given an American release in 1936, when it was distributed by Grand National Pictures.

The film has generally been overshadowed by two slightly later releases, Fire Over England (1937) and The Sea Hawk (1940), which deal with much the same story.

Ronald Neame was assistant camera man. He said Matheson Lang's "fifty-five years and overly generous girth flew somewhat in the face of the slim, historical figure he was portraying." He said during the shoot Claude Friese-Greene, the cinematographer, was drinking heavily and fell ill and wound up in hospital, meaning Neame had to take over. The film was crucial in Neame's career. Filming finished May 1935.

== Reception ==
=== Box office ===
British International admitted this film and Mimi lost money even though they each cost less than $500,000.

=== Critical ===
Variety declared the film "makes for exciting entertainment" with the romance subplot "creates the necessary lightness of touch in a story that would otherwise be too ponderous... Lang gives a satisfying performance in the title-role, though he seems at times a little languid for such a man of action."

Academic Jeffrey Richard later the film was "technically wholly unremarkable. For a sea-going epic, it is chronically studio-bound and handicapped by appalling model shots" and the movie looks like "a filmed pageant. The crowning absurdity is the casting of portly, ageing matinee idol Matheson Lang as Sir Francis Drake. He struts around giving heroic declamatory speeches, striking theatrical poses and looking old enough to be the heroine’s father rather than her lover."

== Bibliography ==
- Low, Rachael. Filmmaking in 1930s Britain. George Allen & Unwin, 1985.
- Richards, Jeffrey. The Age of the Dream Palace: Cinema and Society in 1930s Britain. I.B. Tauris, 2010.
- Wood, Linda. British Films, 1927–1939. British Film Institute, 1986.
