= The Immortal Legions =

Poem by Alfred Noyes

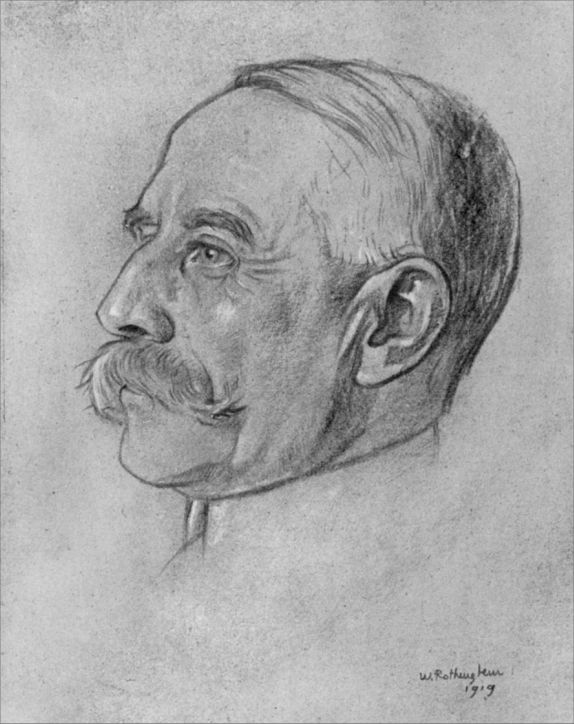
Edward Elgar in 1919, by William Rothenstein

"The Immortal Legions" is a poem written by Alfred Noyes, and set to music by the English composer Edward Elgar. It was one of the songs (also known as the "Pageant of Empire") written to be performed in the Pageant of Empire at the British Empire Exhibition on 21 July 1924.

The poem is of quiet grief and thanksgiving in remembrance of those who died in the achievement of victory.

In the event, the song introduced "A Pageant of Heroes".

The song starts after a short introduction, pensively, in a minor key, with the solo voice which is joined by a simple ostinato-like bass line. The gentle middle section seems to show the sentiment of hope. The song ends triumphally in the relative major key, with words of thanksgiving.

This song was also arranged by the composer as a part-song.

== Recordings ==
- The CD with the book Oh, My Horses! Elgar and the Great War has many historical recordings including The Immortal Legions, a 1985 recording with Anthony Ransome (baritone), Kensington Choir and Symphony Orchestra conducted by Leslie Head
- The CD "The Unknown Elgar" has Sailing Westward and The Immortal Legions, Tudor Choir directed by Barry Collett, with Ken Burley (piano) PEARL SHE CD 9635
