= Our Betters (play) =

1917 play by Somerset Maugham

- Programme from the original West End run.
- Written by: Somerset Maugham
- Original language: English
- Genre: Comedy

Premiere
- Date premiered: 8 March 1917
- Place premiered: Nixon Theatre, Atlantic City, New Jersey

Our Betters is a comedy play by the British writer Somerset Maugham. Set in Mayfair and a country house in Suffolk, the plot revolves around the interaction between newly wealthy Americans and upper-class British society.

It premiered at the Nixon Theatre in Atlantic City, New Jersey before transferring to the Hudson Theatre on Broadway where it ran for 112 performances. It did not premiere in London immediately, but then enjoyed a West End run of 548 performances at the Globe Theatre between 12 September 1923 and 3 January 1925. The London cast included Constance Collier, Ronald Squire (succeeding Yorke Stephens), Reginald Owen, John Stuart, Alfred Drayton, Margaret Bannerman and Martita Hunt.

== Adaptation ==
In 1933 it was made into a film of the same title by the Hollywood studio RKO. Directed by George Cukor and starring Constance Bennett, Anita Louise and Gilbert Roland.

== Bibliography ==
- Goble, Alan. The Complete Index to Literary Sources in Film. Walter de Gruyter, 1999.
- Hastings, Selina. The Secret Lives of Somerset Maugham: A Biography. Simon and Schuster, 2012.
- Wearing, J.P. The London Stage 1920-1929: A Calendar of Productions, Performers, and Personnel. Rowman & Littlefield, 2014.
