= Francis Lascelles (disambiguation) =

Francis Lascelles may refer to:

- Francis Lascelles (1612–1667), regicide who sat in judgement on King Charles I
- Francis Lascelles (British Army officer) (1744–1799), general in the British Army
- Francis Lascelles Jardine (1841–1919), Australian pioneer associated with the exploration and settlement of Far North Queensland
- Frank Lascelles (diplomat) (1841–1920), British diplomat
- Frank Lascelles (pageant master) (1875–1934), British pageant master
