= Sailing Westward =

Poem by Alfred Noyes

"Sailing Westward" is a poem written by Alfred Noyes, and set to music by the English composer Edward Elgar. It was one of the songs (collectively known as the "Pageant of Empire") written to be performed in the Pageant of Empire at the British Empire Exhibition, Wembley Park, on 21 July 1924.

The song descriptively commemorates the adventurous English sea-captains who sailed to "... chase the setting sun ... westward, thro' the thund'ring gales".

Elgar used the same music for four other songs in the set: "The Islands", "Gloriana" (Queen Elizabeth I), "The Cape of Good Hope" (for South Africa) and "Indian Dawn".

This song was arranged by the composer as an accompanied part-song for SATB.

== Recordings ==
- The CD "The Unknown Elgar" has Sailing Westward and The Immortal Legions, Tudor Choir directed by Barry Collett, with Ken Burley (piano) PEARL SHE CD 9635
