= Yorke Stephens =

1886 portrait

Yorke Stephens (26 September 1862 – 5 February 1937) was an English actor. He acted as an amateur before abandoning the law in favour of the theatre and made his professional début in 1879. He appeared in numerous new plays in the West End, on tour and on Broadway. He created leading roles in two comedies by Bernard Shaw.

After 1900, Stephens produced plays and musicals while continuing to act, though he did not appear in many of the pieces that he presented. He appeared in Charles Wyndham's and Herbert Beerbohm Tree's companies in contemporary and classic plays. His last appearance on stage was in 1923, after which he retired.

== Life and career ==
=== Early years ===
Stephens was born in London on 26 September 1862. While training to become a lawyer he performed on stage as an amateur. He was spotted by Agnes Boucicault, who introduced him to the manager of the Olympic Theatre, where he made his professional début in The Worship of Bacchus in July 1879. At first he had only a small role, but he was understudy to the juvenile lead, Luigi Lablache who fell ill, leaving Stephens to take over the part for the rest of the run.

He had a similar stroke of luck in his second engagement on tour and at the Royalty Theatre with Jennie Lee's company. The actor cast in the juvenile lead in the comedy Midge failed to turn up and Stephens was promoted from a small role to a leading one. He was engaged by Marie Litton in her production of As You Like It in 1880 and was once again promoted from a minor role to a major one when Kyrle Bellew, the Orlando, fell ill. Stephens played Gibbet in The Beaux' Stratagem at the Theatre Royal, Drury Lane under Litton's management; on the subsequent tour and in London he played roles in comedies by Sheridan and Garrick.

=== 1881–1899 ===
In 1881 the actor-manager John McCullough invited Stephens to go to the US as juvenile lead. He joined the Madison Square Theatre for six months, and was then engaged by Augustin Daly to play juvenile leads at his New York theatre. He then toured with McCullough with a repertory of Shakespearian plays. This association lasted until April 1884, when Stephens returned to England and signed with Edgar Bruce to play Gilbert Vaughan in Called Back on tour.

During the rest of the 1880s Stephens played in five London theatres, and was briefly the manager of the Olympic. His most notable role of the 1890s was as Bluntschli in the original production of Shaw's Arms and the Man at the Avenue Theatre in April 1894. The Stage said that he had "never done anything better than this brusque, cynically but not ungenially matter-of fact soldier of fortune". In 1896 he toured as Rudolf Rassendyl in a dramatisation of The Prisoner of Zenda. In November 1899 he appeared as Valentine in the premiere of Shaw's You Never Can Tell. That was a one-off private performance; when the play was presented to the public at a series of matinee performances the following year he again played Valentine as well as co-directing.

=== 1900–1937 ===
In 1900 Stephens again took up management, presenting a musical, The Gay Pretenders, at the Globe Theatre, with a cast including George Grossmith Jr, Richard Temple, Frank Wyatt and John Coates. In 1901–1902, this time at Terry's Theatre, he presented plays including The Giddy Goat, A Tight Corner, My Artful Valet, Sheerluck Jones and The New Clown. Stephens did not appear in any of these productions, and returned to the stage in 1903, touring as Captain Mowbray in Mrs Gorringe's Necklace (a role created by Charles Wyndham) and the following year he toured as Heath Desmond in Cousin Kate. In 1906 he joined Wyndham's company at the Criterion Theatre in The Candidate, an adaptation of Alexandre Bisson's Le Député de Bombignac, with Wyndham and Rutland Barrington. This did not attract the public and closed after 19 performances. Stephens then accepted an engagement with Herbert Beerbohm Tree at His Majesty's Theatre in The Red Lamp, with Constance Collier, Lilian Braithwaite and Kate Cutler.

Stephens again joined Wyndham's company in at the Criterion, appearing in the curtain raiser, A Scotch Mariage and, in the main work, The Mollusc, taking over the leading role of Tom Kemp from Wyndham. At the Criterion in 1909 he again played Mowbray in Mrs Gorringe's Necklace. The Era commented, "Stephens, an artist who is always safe, sound, and successful, depicts Captain Mowbray in a firm and finished style, and deserves very warm praise for his strong, steady, and skilful performance … The ease and aplomb of the rendering are excellent".

In a rare appearance in Shakespeare, Stephens played Gratiano in The Merchant of Venice at His Majesty's in April 1910, after which he returned to the US, appearing as John Sayle in Pomander Walk at Wallack's Theatre, New York from December 1910 to April 1911. During 1912 he appeared in a music-hall sketch, Just Like a Woman, in which he played at a royal command performance at Sandringham on 2 December 1912.

In May 1915 Stephens returned to the role of Captain Mowbray, this time at the London Coliseum. His final West End roles were Dr Jordon in Ye Gods at the Kingsway in May 1916; Edward Wales in The Thirteenth Chair at the Duke of York's in October 1917; and Thornton Clay in Somerset Maugham's satirical comedy Our Betters at the Globe in 1923, after which he retired.

Stephens died at his house in St John's Wood, London, on 5 February 1937 aged 74.

== Sources ==
- Parker, John, ed. (1925). Who's Who in the Theatre (fifth ed.). London: Sir Isaac Pitman and Sons. OCLC 10013159.
- Wearing, J. P. (1976). The London Stage, 1890–1899: A Calendar of Plays and Players. Metuchen: Scarecrow Press. ISBN 0810809109.
- Wearing, J. P. (1981). The London Stage, 1900–1909: A Calendar of Plays and Players. Metuchen: Scarecrow Press. ISBN 081081403X.
