= Harriet Henry =

American novelist

Harriet Henry, formally known as Countess Harriet Henry de Steuch, (1897–1974) was an American novelist.

In the 1930s and 1940s, she wrote sixteen novels and was on the staff of Vogue. Two of her books were made into films.

Harriet Henry was married to Count Nils de Steuch of Sweden.

Henry was from New York and died in Tucson, Arizona, on April 19, 1974, aged 77.

== Bibliography ==
- Halves (1928)
- Jackdaw's Strut (1930)
- Lady with a Past (1931)
- Touch Us Gently (1933)
- We Walk Alone (1935)
- No More, No Less (1938)
- Widow's Peak (1940)
- Shake Down the Stairs
- Bearing False Witness
- When is a Lady
- Rakish Halo
- Burn, Candle, Burn
- Sing All the Summer

== Filmography ==
- Bought (1931) (originally to be titled White Collar Girl) was based on her novel Jackdaw's Strut
- Lady with a Past (1932) was based on her novel of the same name
