= Summertime (1919 play) =

Play by Louis N. Parker

- Original language: English
- Written by: Louis N. Parker
- Genre: Comedy

Premiere
- Date: 30 October 1919
- Place: Royalty Theatre, London

Summertime is a comedy play by the British writer Louis N. Parker.

It ran for 52 performances at the Royalty Theatre in London's West End between 30 October and 13 December 1919. The original cast included Fay Compton, C. Aubrey Smith, Cyril Raymond, Arthur Pusey, Mary Brough and Madge Stuart. Compton plays an Australian woman visiting Devon who manages to arrange four different marriages. One review criticised the "stagey and artificial" Devon depicted in the play, comparing it unfavourably to the portrayals of the county in the works of Eden Phillpotts.

== Bibliography ==
- Wearing, J.P. The London Stage 1910-1919: A Calendar of Productions, Performers, and Personnel.. Rowman & Littlefield, 2013.
