= Pomander Walk (play) =

1910 play by Louis N. Parker

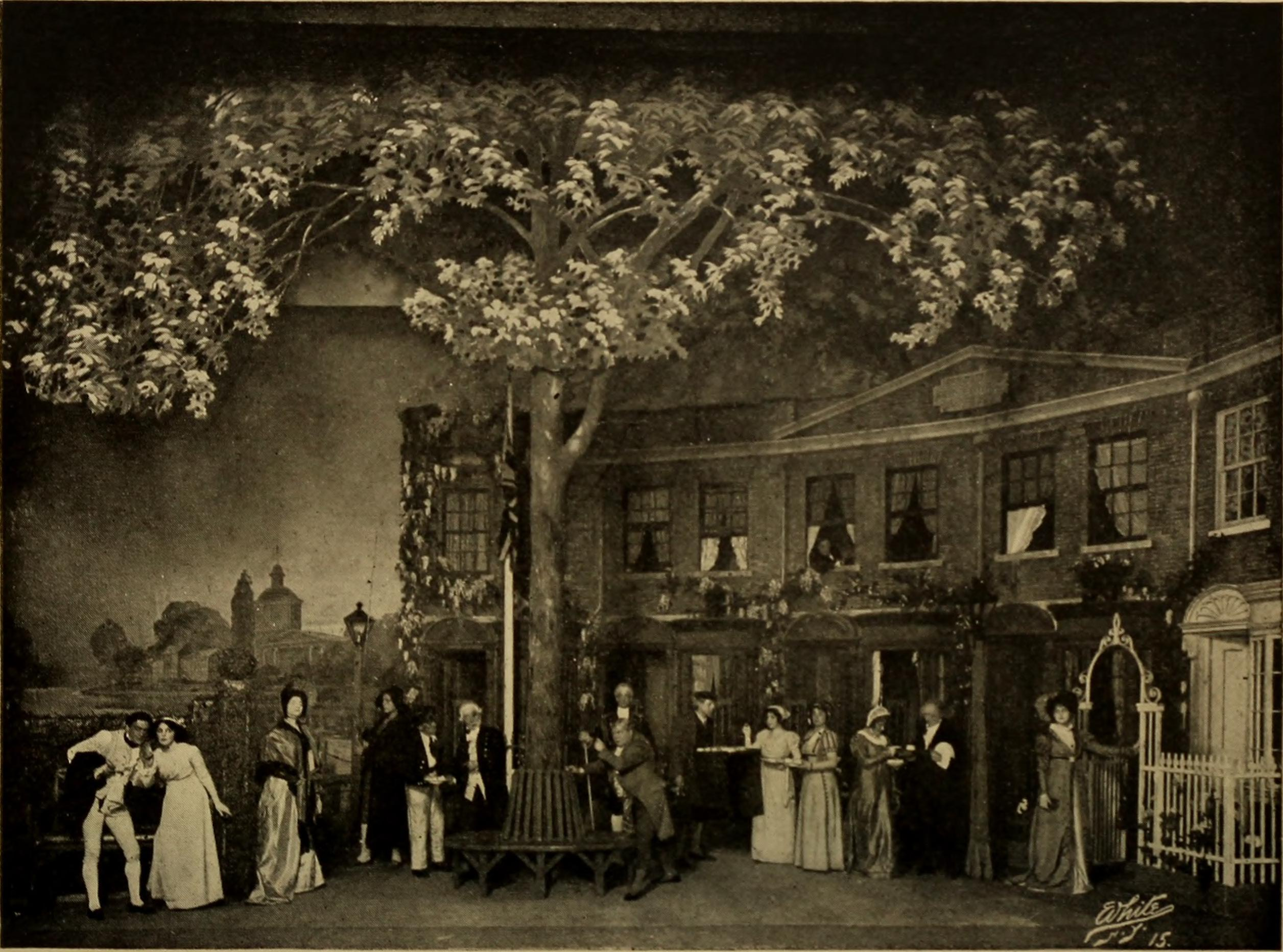
- Original language: English
- Written by: Louis N. Parker
- Music by: Louis N. Parker
- Subject: Character-driven sketches of light romance
- Genre: Comedy
- Setting: Pomander Walk, near Chiswick, May–June 1805

Premiere
- Date: 20 December 1910
- Place: Wallack's Theatre
- Directed by: Louis N. Parker and Hugh Ford

Pomander Walk is a 1910 historical comedy by the British writer Louis N. Parker. Sub-titled "A Comedy of Happiness", it has three acts, a single setting, and according to its author, neither plot nor villain. The place is a semi-circular row of houses facing the river Thames in Chiswick, West London. The story concerns the bumpy road to bliss for two young lovers and the romantic awakening of three other couples. The play's action spans nine days during late May and early June 1805.

The play was first produced by Liebler & Company, directed and with music by the author, with sets by Gates and Morange. Hugh Ford, the general stage director for Liebler & Company, had a hand in revising Parker's original stage instructions. The ensemble-based cast was entirely English. It had its debut in Montreal during December 1910, and made its Broadway premiere later the same month, running through April 1911 for 143 performances.

After Broadway, it went on tour in America and had a separate production in London's West End during 1911. The play was later adapted for a musical called Marjolaine in 1922.

== Characters ==
Characters are listed in order of appearance within their scope. As per Louis Parker's own statement, there were no lead characters.

Supporting:

- Admiral Sir Peter Antrobus is a cheery old salt with an eye-patch, a bachelor who lives at No. 1 Pomander Walk.
- Jerome Brooke-Hoskyn, Esq is a heavy, slow-moving fellow, married with four young daughters, and a secret.
- Mrs. Pamela Poskett is a lively fortyish widow who lives with her cat at No. 2 Pomander Walk.
- Madame Lucie Lachesnais is the beautiful English widow of a Frenchman. (Note: The playwright's instruction is that the surname is pronounced La-sher-ney, with the middle syllable very short.)
- Mlle. Marjolaine Lachesnais is 17, a pretty Anglo-French girl who lives with her mother at No. 5 Pomander Walk.
- Lt. John Sayle called Jack, is 23, an officer of the Royal Navy, son and heir to Baron Otford.
- John Sayle, Baron Otford is the widower father of Lt. Sayle, who once loved and lost a girl named Lucy Pryor.

Featured:

- Mr. Basil Pringle is a hunchback violinist with a pale face, a paying "guest" of the Pennymints. (Note: The fiction of no lodgers in Pomander Walk is maintained by both the Pennymints and Jerome Brooke-Hoskyn.)
- Miss Ruth Pennymint is a spinster, fortyish, thin, who lives at No. 4 Pomander Walk with her sister Barbara.
- The Eyesore is a non-resident, a scruffy fellow in a long coat who fishes but never speaks or catches a fish.
- Jim is Sir Peter's servant at No. 1 Pomander Walk, an old sailor with a limp.
- Miss Barbara Pennymint is thirtyish, pretty but like Ruth, worn with straitened circumstances.
- Nanette is the Breton maid to Mme. and Mlle. Lachesnais in No. 5 Pomander Walk, who knows no English.
- Jane is maid to Jerome Brooke-Hoskyn and his unseen wife Selina at No. 3 Pomander Walk.
- Rev. Jacob Sternroyd is an elderly, bespectacled, antiquarian widower; a paying "guest" at No. 3 Pomander Walk.
- The Hon. Caroline Thring is an officious do-gooder, the heiress whom Baron Otford wants for his son.

Bit players:

- Footman
- The Muffin-Man
- The Lamplighter

== Synopsis ==
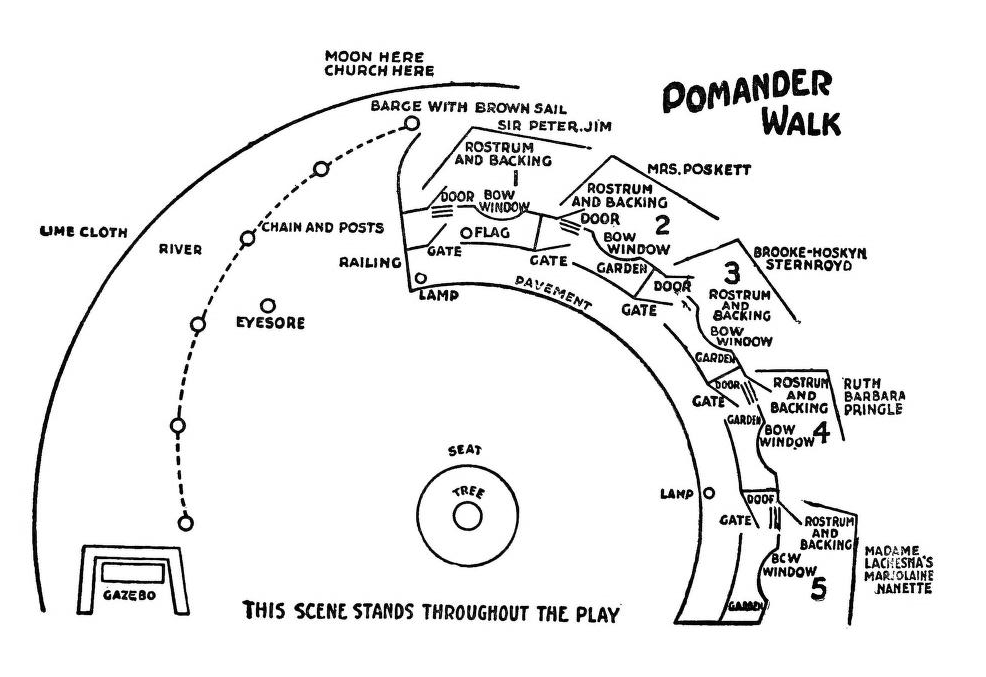

The overall setting is laid on Pomander Walk near Chiswick, a residential street of five tiny houses in Queen Anne style, on the bank of the river Thames. For a matinee charity benefit in April 1911, Parker wrote a brief rhyming prologue, delivered by the character of Marjolaine before the curtain rises, which became part of the play thereafter.

Act I (Saturday afternoon, 25th May, 1805.) The inhabitants of Pomander Walk are introduced through little interactions. Caroline Thring seeks Pomander Lane to dispense alms, and is sent packing. Baron Otford comes by to ask Admiral Sir Peter to convince his son Jack to marry an heiress. He himself is still pining for his lost love. Sir Peter promises, not realizing he just sent off the pushy heiress. Marjolaine is surprised by Jack, who has rowed up the river. At first standoffish, she agrees to bring him refreshment. He finds the name "Lucy Pryor" in her book, but is laughingly told it is Maman's. The Muffin-Man's bell brings all the inhabitants out to buy his wares. Brooke-Hoskyn and Jack recognize each other; it is apparent the former is actually a servant. Jack greets Sir Peter, who introduces him to the folks, but Mme. Lachesnais faints when she hears his full name. (Curtain)

Act II (Saturday morning, 1st June, 1805.) Brooke tells his wife he sent an unsigned letter to Baron Otford about Jack and Marjolaine. His goal is to keep Jack away from Pomander Walk, so Brooke's secret will be safe. A gloomy Marjolaine tries to pump Sir Peter about Jack's service with him at Copenhagen. Baron Otford tells Sir Peter about the letter and Jack's owning up to loving the girl. The Baron made him promise to stay away for a week, which is now up. Madame tries to console her daughter about Jack's broken promise to come back, and ends up telling her about her own broken romance with Baron Otford. Ruth complains to Marjolaine of her sister and Basil's inability to display their affection. Marjolaine tells Barbara to train her parrot to say "Tell Barbara you love her". Madame Lachesnais meets up with Baron Otford at the Gazebo; he does not recognize her as Lucy Pryor at first. She dismisses his concerns, saying her family wanted nothing to do with his. Jack explains to Marjolaine why he stayed away. Together, they waylay Rev. Sternroyd, who agrees to ask the Bishop for a special license to marry. Sir Peter rescues Mrs. Poskett's cat from the river, earning him a warm embrace. Caroline Thring returns, but as she walks past, the open door of each house slams shut. (Note: The action described in this last sentence was added after the first performances.) (Curtain)

Act III (Monday evening, 3rd June, 1805.) The Moon not yet risen, the Lamplighter lights the Walk's two street lamps. All the inhabitants of Pomander Walk gather for tea outside by the big elm tree. They are sore at Sir Peter for not proposing to Mrs. Poskett, who sits in gloom. Brooke-Hoskyn is thus set to take over leadership of the Walk, but retreats when Baron Otford comes by. Otford informs Sir Peter that Hoskyn used to be his butler. Sir Peter is elated, but decides it would be unfair to expose him. Barbara and Basil are now engaged, Marjolaine's suggestion about the parrot having worked. Eventually Sir Peter's reluctance is overcome and he asks Mrs. Poskett to marry him. Baron Otford and Madame Lachesnais reconcile and agree to give each other a new chance, while giving Jack and Marjolaine their blessing to wed. (Curtain)

== Original production ==
=== Background ===
For the October 1911 issue of the Green Book Magazine, Louis Parker wrote a tongue-in-cheek account of how Pomander Walk came to be. He said the title popped into his head after a foggy walk in London during November 1909. Acknowledging there was no connection between the title words, Parker said "And with the words came a mental picture: six little houses, six little families". The characters in each house came out and introduced themselves, according to Parker. He prepared a 70 page scenario, which was rejected by several English producers. When American producer George C. Tyler was dining at Parker's home, Parker tried to interest him "in a really rather remarkable story I had just invented about a Danish prince whose mother had poisoned his father and married his uncle". Tyler, however, insisted on producing Pomander Walk as soon as Parker dramatised it. Parker tried to dissuade him, saying Pomander Walk had no plot, no hero, no heroine, not even a change of scenery, but Tyler was adamant.

A less colorful account from The Observer reported that Parker had withdrawn Pomander Walk from the list of plays awaiting production at the Haymarket. Curtis Brown went further, saying the play was returned by Herbert Trench of the Haymarket, as he had wanted some changes that Parker refused to make. This was just before Parker and his chosen cast set sail for New York City on board RMS Cedric. Tyler had ceded the producer's usual task of casting, with one exception. Tyler had insisted Parker's daughter Dorothy (Note: She was born in Sherborne, Dorset during June 1885. See Dorset, England, Church of England Births and Baptisms, 1813-1906, retrieved from Ancestry.com. She had a ten year career on Broadway, but preferred living in England, even after her husband, actor Lennox Pawle, relocated to Hollywood.) could play the role of Marjolaine, over the playwright's objections. Parker wanted her to use a stage name, but Tyler refused. Parker later said he hated the chore of casting, finding it difficult to say "no", especially to actresses. He vowed that his "next play should contain a hundred female parts or none at all."

Parker's original concept for the Pomander Walk set had six houses, with the sixth being for Rev. Jacob Sternroyd. Louis Parker made up some doggeral lines to celebrate the six houses, which figured prominently in early publicity. However, when it came time to design the actual set, there was not enough room for the sixth house. So Parker did some rewriting to place the Rev. Sternroyd on the lower floor of No. 3 Pomander Walk. The same fate befell a sedan-chair in Act I for Baron Otford; there was not enough room for it to make an entrance on the set.

=== Cast ===
Principal cast only for the opening at Montreal and during the original Broadway run.
Role	Actor	Dates	Notes and sources
Sir Peter Antrobus	George Giddens	12 Dec 1910 – 22 Apr 1911	
Jerome Brooke-Hoskyn	Lennox Pawle	12 Dec 1910 – 8 Apr 1911	Pawle left for the role of Napoleon Pettingill in the revised Marriage a la Carte tour.
Jerome Brooke-Hoskyn	William Hawtry	10 Apr 1910 – 22 Apr 1911	
Pamela Poskett	Cicely Richards	12 Dec 1910 – 22 Apr 1911	
Madame Lachesnais	Sybil Carlisle	12 Dec 1910 – 22 Apr 1911	
Marjolaine Lachesnais	Dorothy Parker	12 Dec 1910 – 22 Apr 1911	This was Dorothy Isabel Parker, the playwright's daughter, not the American poet and author.
Lt. John Sayle	Edgar Kent	12 Dec 1910 – 22 Apr 1911	
John Sayle, Baron Otford	Yorke Stephens	12 Dec 1910 – 22 Apr 1911	Stephens was the husband of Helen Leyton, who played Ruth Pennymint.
Basil Pringle	Geoffrey Douglas	12 Dec 1910 – 17 Dec 1911	
Basil Pringle	Reginald Dance	20 Dec 1910 – 22 Apr 1911	
Ruth Pennymint	Helen Leyton	12 Dec 1910 – 22 Apr 1911	
The Eyesore	Leslie M. Hunt	12 Dec 1910 – 22 Apr 1911	
Jim	Stanley Lathbury	12 Dec 1910 – 22 Apr 1911	
Barbara Pennymint	Winifred Fraser	12 Dec 1910 – 22 Apr 1911	
Nanette	Harriet Davis	12 Dec 1910 – 22 Apr 1911	
Jane	Margaret Phillips	12 Dec 1910 – 22 Apr 1911	Besides her own slight role, Phillips was understudy for all the other female characters.
Rev. Jacob Sternroyd	T. Wygney Percyval	12 Dec 1910 – 22 Apr 1911	
Caroline Thring	Marie Burke	12 Dec 1910 – 22 Apr 1911	

=== Opening ===
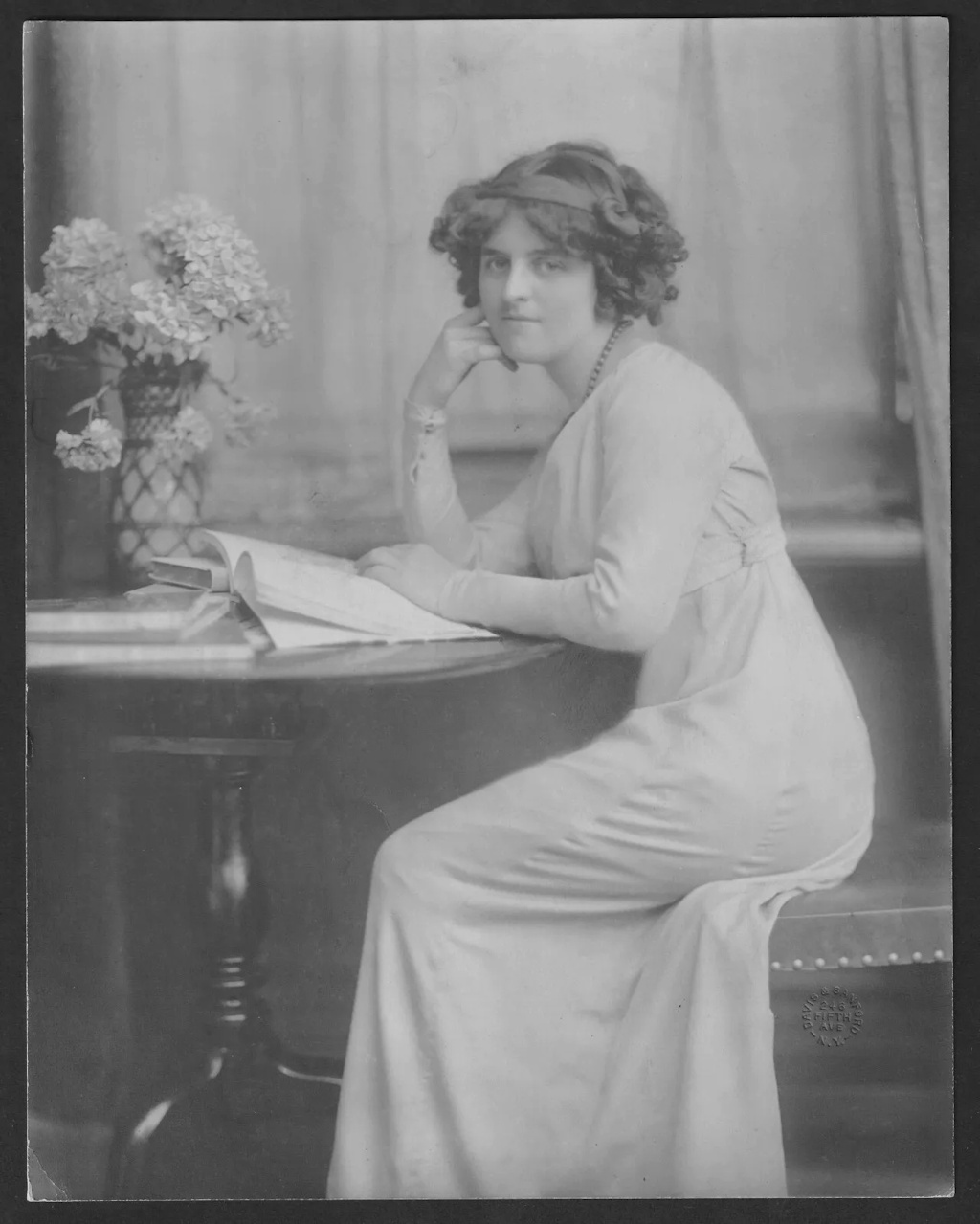
Dorothy Parker

Pomander Walk had its tryout at the Princess Theatre, in Montreal, on 12 December 1910. Local reviewers were impressed with the finely drawn characters and the actors playing them, while recognizing the story was trifling. Dorothy Parker was especially favored: "She is the quintessesnce of girlish charm, and plays the ingenue role with a grace, a witchery, and a winsomeness that captured the whole audience last night."

Parker mentioned that after the first few performances, Liebler's director Hugh Ford revised the staging. In his 1934 memoir, Tyler says the Act II ending was flat until Parker hit upon the notion of having the all the doors close in Caroline Thring's face one after another. There was also a cast change. As late as 18 December 1910 newspapers reported Geoffrey Douglas in the cast, but thereafter the role of Basil Pringle was recorded as belonging to Reginald Dance.

=== Broadway premiere and reception ===
The production had its Broadway premiere at Wallack's Theatre on 20 December 1910. The reviewer for The New York Times said Pomander Walk should be very popular, given it has "the rare charm of novelty and sweetness". They were most impressed with how the play kept four romances going at the same time without loss of interest in any. The Standard Union critic said: "The comedy is sweet and entertaining, without what is generally known as a star, and decided absence of anything approaching a climax." The critic for The Brooklyn Daily Eagle called Pomander Walk "an original, wholesome, and thoroughly well-acted play".

=== Broadway closing ===
Pomander Walk closed at Wallack's Theatre on 22 April 1911, with most of the company returning to England.

=== West End production ===
Pomander Walk ran for 43 performances at the Playhouse Theatre in London's West End theatre in 1911, with a cast that included Reginald Owen, Frederick Culley, Winifred Emery and Margery Maude.

== Adaptations ==
=== Literary ===
Parker adapted Pomander Walk into a novel that was illustrated by J. Scott Williams.

=== Stage ===
Pomander Walk was adapted into a musical called Marjolaine, which premiered at the Broadhurst Theatre on 24 January 1922. The musical was produced by Russell Janney from a libretto by Catherine Chisholm Cushing, with music and lyrics by Hugo Felix and Brian Hooker. Peggy Wood had the eponymous role, with Lennox Pawle reprising his character of Jerome Brooke-Hoskyn.

== Bibliography ==
- Louis N. Parker. Pomander Walk: A Comedy in Three Acts. Samuel French, 1915. - Dedicated to his daughter, Dorothy Parker.
- Louis N. Parker. Pomander Walk. John Lane Company, 1911. - Dedicated to producer George C. Tyler.
- George C. Tyler and J. C. Furnas. Whatever Goes Up. Bobbs Merrill, 1934.
- Wearing, J. P. The London Stage 1910–1919: A Calendar of Productions, Performers, and Personnel. Rowman & Littlefield, 2013.
