= Bought =

1931 film

- Theatrical release poster
- Directed by: Archie Mayo
- Written by: Adaptation & dialogue: Charles Kenyon; Raymond Griffith
- Based on: Jackdaw's Strut by Harriet Henry
- Starring: Constance Bennett
- Cinematography: Ray June
- Edited by: George Marks
- Production company: Warner Bros. Pictures
- Distributed by: Warner Bros. Pictures
- Release date: August 22, 1931 (US)
- Running time: 92 minutes
- Country: United States
- Language: English
- Budget: $425,000
- Box office: $777,000

Bought is a 1931 American pre-Code drama film produced and released by Warner Bros. Pictures and directed by Archie Mayo. The movie stars Constance Bennett and features Ben Lyon, Richard Bennett and Dorothy Peterson. It is based on the 1930 novel Jackdaw's Strut by Harriet Henry.

Warner Bros. paid Bennett an all-time high salary of $30,000 a week for her work in this film.

== Plot ==
Raised in poverty by a never-married mother, Stephanie Dale resents her mother's working-class sensibilities. Dreaming of a rich lifestyle Stephanie gets a job modeling as a modiste shop when a wealthy patron, David Meyer, notices her and is immediately attracted to her. However, the same day Stephanie returns home to find that her mother has died. She moves out and finds an apartment in a good location for meeting celebrities. David and Stephanie begin spending time together and his wealth allows her to indulge in luxuries. They share an interest in books, but she's put off by his age, clothes, and manners. Young, handsome Nick Amory who lives in the building next door is also interested in Stephanie, and they begin a romance.

One day David notices a photograph of Stephanie's mother and realizes that he is her father—but keeps this information secret as he helps his daughter meet wealthy socialites. At one of the many parties she attends, she meets Charles Carter Jr. who immediately falls in love with her, but she rejects his advances despite being drunk. Nonetheless, Nick gets jealous and ends their relationship. When Charles then proposes, she accepts, and 11 days later when Nick finally gets a raise, he proposes to Stephanie as well, but she is forced to turn him down.

All is going well as Stephanie and Charles plan their wedding—until Charles discovers that Stephanie's parents were never married and the backstory she has created for herself has all been a lie. He promptly cancels the wedding. This makes Stephanie realize how shallow society people truly are, but upon returning to Nick, he too rejects her when she admits that she slept with Charles despite "Never really loving him".

One day she receives a book from David and visits him to apologize for her past regrettable behavior. While she is browsing through his library, she discovers that Nick has been waiting there to see her. They reconcile and Stephanie finally learns that David is her father. The film ends with David arranging his daughter's wedding to Nick.

== Cast ==
- Constance Bennett as Stephanie Dale
- Ben Lyon as Nick Amory
- Richard Bennett as David Meyer
- Dorothy Peterson as Mrs. Dale
- Ray Milland as Charles Carter Jr.
- Arthur Stuart Hull as Charles Carter Sr.
- Clara Blandick as Mrs. Sprigg
- Maude Eburne as Mrs. Chauncey
- Doris Lloyd as Mrs. Barry
- Paul Porcasi as Rapello
- Barbara Leonard as Mary Kiernan

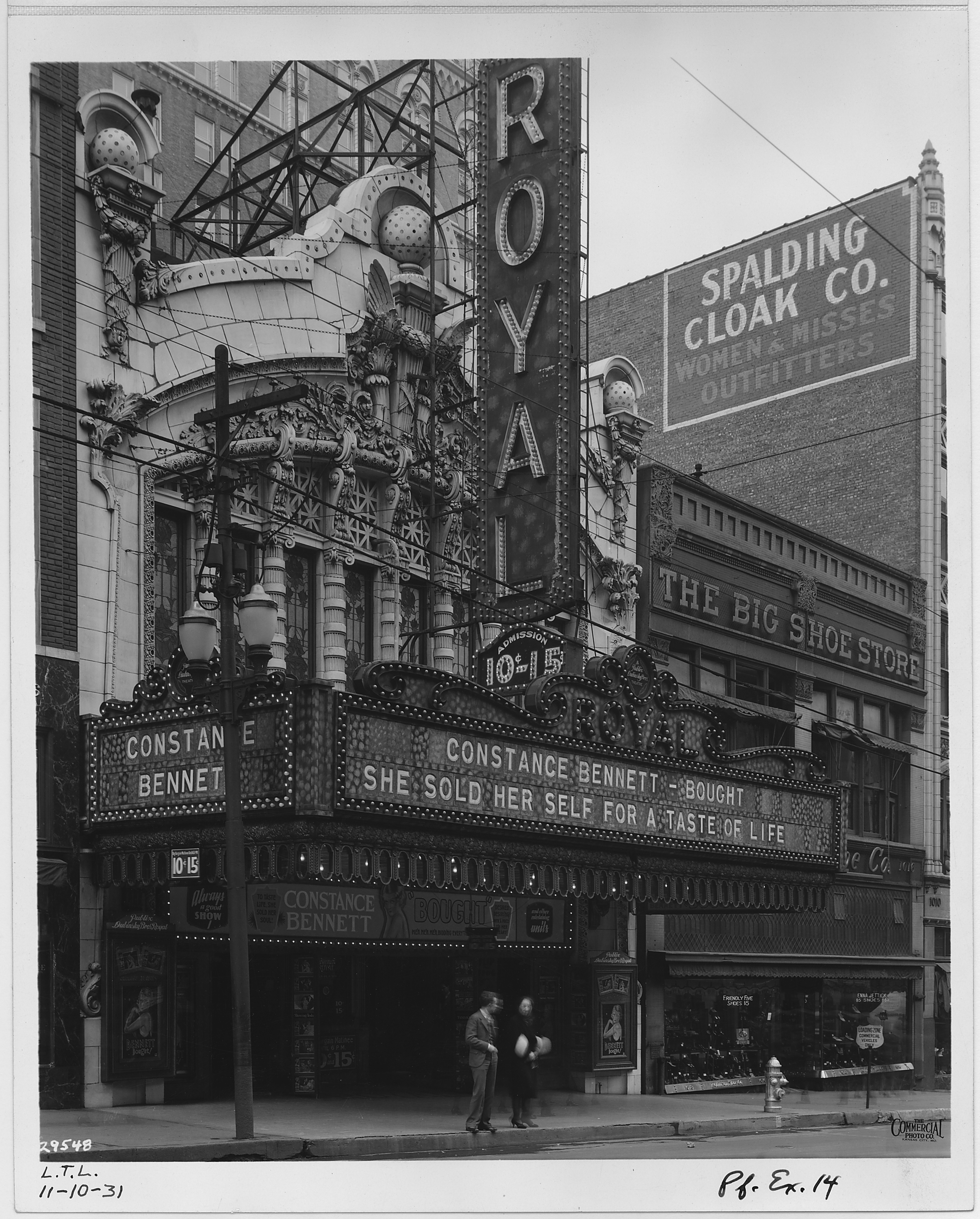
Royal Theater in Kansas City showing the film.

Cast notes:

- Richard Bennett was Constance Bennett's father in real life. Bought was the only film they made together.

== Box office ==
According to Warner Bros the film earned $598,000 domestic and $179,000 foreign.

== Preservation ==
The film survives intact and has been broadcast on television and cable. It was transferred on to 16mm film by Associated Artists Productions in the 1950s for broadcast on television. [*note, not in Catalog of Holdings from 1978]
