= Mavourneen =

Play by Louis N. Parker

- Written by: Louis N. Parker
- Original language: English
- Genre: Comedy

Premiere
- Date premiered: 23 October 1915
- Place premiered: His Majesty's Theatre, London

Mavourneen is a 1915 historical comedy play by the British writer Louis N. Parker. It portrays a dalliance between Charles II and an young Irish woman in Restoration England.

It ran for 98 performances at His Majesty's Theatre in London's West End between 23 October 1915 and 29 January 1916. The original cast featured Malcolm Cherry as Charles II, Lily Elsie as Patricia O'Brien, Gerald Lawrence as Buckingham and Athene Seyler as Catherine of Braganza. It also included C.V. France, Reginald Owen, Ben Field and Violet Graham. It was produced by Sir Herbert Tree while Joseph Harker designed the sets.

== Bibliography ==
- Wearing, J.P. The London Stage 1910-1919: A Calendar of Productions, Performers, and Personnel.. Rowman & Littlefield, 2013.
