= Our Betters =

1933 film by George Cukor

- Original poster
- Directed by: George Cukor
- Screenplay by: Jane Murfin; Harry Wagstaff Gribble
- Based on: Our Betters; 1917 play by Somerset Maugham
- Produced by: David O. Selznick
- Starring: Constance Bennett; Anita Louise; Gilbert Roland
- Cinematography: Charles Rosher
- Edited by: Jack Kitchin
- Music by: Bernhard Kaun; Roy Webb
- Production company: RKO Radio Pictures
- Distributed by: RKO Radio Pictures
- Release date: February 23, 1933
- Running time: 83 minutes
- Country: United States
- Language: English

Our Betters is a 1933 American pre-Code satirical comedy film directed by George Cukor and starring Constance Bennett, Anita Louise and Gilbert Roland. The screenplay by Jane Murfin and Harry Wagstaff Gribble is based on the 1917 play of the same title by Somerset Maugham. Tommy Atkins worked as assistant director, while the sets were designed by the art director Van Nest Polglase.

== Plot ==
Just after her wedding, American hardware heiress Pearl Saunders overhears her husband, Lord George Grayston, telling his mistress that he only married her for her money. Disillusioned, she grows hard and cynical.

Five years later, she has made herself a force among the British upper class with her parties. Among her friends are divorced Duchess Minnie, gossip-loving Thornton Clay, philanthropic Princess Flora, and Arthur Fenwick, her wealthy and adoring lover. Arthur discreetly provides her with a much-needed regular allowance, as her now absent husband has squandered most of her fortune.

Pearl introduces her younger sister Bessie to English aristocracy and especially to eligible young bachelor Lord Harry Bleane. The glamour of high society seduces Bessie. When her former fiancé, Fleming Harvey, comes to see her, it becomes clear to him that she no longer loves him. Harry proposes to Bessie; she accepts, though she tells him only that she likes him very much.

Pearl's social circle spends a weekend at the Grayston country estate. There, Minnie's gigolo, Pepi D'Costa, privately woos Pearl. Eventually, she has a rendezvous with him in the detached teahouse. However, this is detected by Minnie. She maliciously sends an unsuspecting Bessie to fetch her purse, whereupon Bessie sees too much. Her suspicions confirmed, Minnie denounces Pearl before the others. Arthur is furious and disheartened. Pearl's feelings are not hurt; she is more concerned about it becoming known.

Pearl delays Minnie's departure for London and, through her wiles, manages to make up with both Minnie and Arthur. Minnie even forgives Pepi, finally agreeing to marry him. She then persuades Minnie to stay another night and learn the latest tango steps from effete dance instructor Ernest. When Bessie expresses her disgust with her sister's behavior, however, Pearl is truly hurt. She has second thoughts and persuades Harry to break the engagement. Bessie asks a delighted Fleming to take her away.

== Cast ==
- Constance Bennett as Pearl, Lady Grayston
- Anita Louise as Bessie Saunders
- Gilbert Roland as Pepi D'Costa
- Violet Kemble-Cooper as Duchess Minnie
- Charles Starrett as Fleming Harvey
- Grant Mitchell as Thornton Clay
- Phoebe Foster as the Princess
- Minor Watson as Arthur Fenwick
- Hugh Sinclair as Lord Harry Bleane
- Alan Mowbray as Lord George Grayston
- Tyrell Davis as Ernest
- Finis Barton as Diana, George's Mistress
- May Beatty as Duchess of Hightower

== Production ==
Producer David O. Selznick enlisted Elsa Maxwell, a gossip columnist whose reputation as a hostess of successful society parties was widely known, to serve as a consultant for the film's general tone and its costumes, which were designed by Hattie Carnegie.

The film premiered at Radio City Music Hall in New York City.

== Critical reception ==
Mordaunt Hall, film critic for The New York Times in 1933, called the film "a highly praiseworthy pictorial interpretation of the stage work" and added the following about Cukor's direction and Rosher's cinematography:

It is an intelligently worked out film, thanks to the director, George Cukor, and while it does not bother much about cinematic art, the scenes are always beautifully photographed and nicely staged. It has heaps of amusement and some hearty laughter, and Mr. Maugham's fine hand still is apparent notwithstanding certain tactful studio changes."
