= Married? =

1926 film

- Directed by: George Terwilliger
- Written by: Marjorie Benton Cooke (story)
- Produced by: Herman F. Jans
- Starring: Owen Moore; Constance Bennett
- Cinematography: Walter Blakeley; Louis Dunmyre
- Distributed by: Renown Pictures
- Release date: February 17, 1926
- Running time: 6 reels
- Country: United States
- Language: Silent (English intertitles)

Married? is a 1926 American silent comedy film directed by George Terwilliger and starring Owen Moore and Constance Bennett. It was distributed by small silent studio Renown Pictures.

== Plot ==
As described in a film magazine review, Dennis Shawn is the young manager of the western lumber holdings and lumber camp of an estate to which Marcia Livingston is heir. A railroad company wants the land, which is useless unless old Senorita Padrasso, owner of the adjacent tract, also sells. She consents to sell to the railroad provided that Dennis weds Marcia, whom he has never seen as she is in New York. He agrees and the couple are married by telephone. Kate Pinto, a half-breed who has always loved Dennis, rescues Dennis at the cost of her life. Marcia, who is a jazz-mad flapper, questions the legality of the marriage and whether they are still single, and refuses to honor the wedding. However, this is contrary to the land deal, which requires the married couple to live together for three months. She is kidnapped by her husband Dennis, who takes her back to the lumber camp, where she eventually learns to love him.

== Cast ==
- Owen Moore as Dennis Shawn
- Constance Bennett as Marcia Livingston
- Evangeline Russell as Kate Pinto
- Julia Hurley as Madame Du Pont
- Nick Thompson as Joe Pinto
- Antrim Short as Chuck English
- Helen Burch as 7-11 Sadie
- John Costello as Judge Tracey
- Betty Hilburn as Mary Jane Paul
- Rafaela Ottiano as Maid
- Gordon Standing as Clark Jessup
- Frank Walsh as Harvey Williams

== Preservation ==
Prints of Married? are held at the Library of Congress, Museum of Modern Art, UCLA Film & Television Archive, and George Eastman Museum.
