= Constance Bennett Calls on You =

American radio talk show, 1945–1946

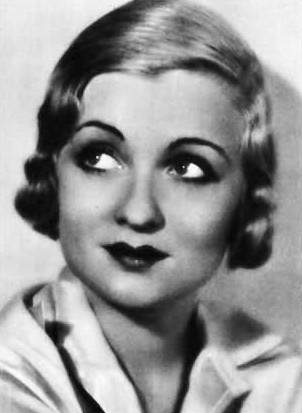
- Constance Bennett, c. 1930
- Other names: The Constance Bennett Show
- Genre: Talk
- Country of origin: United States
- Language(s): English
- Syndicates: ABC
- Starring: Constance Bennett
- Announcer: George Ansbro; Robert Latting
- Original release: May 21, 1945 – March 15, 1946

Constance Bennett Calls on You is an American old-time radio talk show. It was broadcast on ABC May 21, 1945 – March 15, 1946. Beginning November 20, 1945, it was also carried on CJBC in Toronto, Canada. The program was also known as The Constance Bennett Show.

== Format ==
Constance Bennett Calls on You featured discussion of topics in which women were interested — from new hats to families to world events. A preview article in the trade publication Billboard said, "She'll tell about the people she meets, the places she goes and the things she does."

Fridays on the program were devoted to answering letters mailed in by listeners. The show also had a "woman of the week" feature. In conjunction with the weekly recognition, the Gruen Watch Co. designed a new model watch named after Bennett and awarded one of them to each "woman of the week".

== Sponsorship ==
As one of ABC's "co-operative programs", Constance Bennett Calls on You was part of a plan under which advertisers paid only for sponsorship in their own listening areas. The live broadcasts had commercials inserted by local announcers. Broadcasts were sponsored by various businesses (mainly department stores and specialty stores) in the markets in which the program was heard. By late October 1945, the number of sponsors had reached 26.

Bennett often integrated advertising into her comments. Advertisers were notified in advance what items of clothing or accessories she planned to talk about in a particular day's broadcast. Sponsors who had those items for sale could then advertise in newspapers and in-store promotions that Bennett would be talking about them on that day's program.

== Personnel ==
Actress Constance Bennett was the hostess for the program. She and the announcer discussed whatever topics were on each day's agenda. Announcers were George Ansbro and Robert Latting. Bennett sometimes interviewed prominent guests, such as Elsa Maxwell.
