= Lady with a Past =

1932 film

- Directed by: Edward H. Griffith; E. J. Babille (assistant)
- Screenplay by: Horace Jackson
- Based on: Lady with a Past; 1931 novel by Harriet Henry
- Produced by: Charles R. Rogers
- Starring: Constance Bennett; Ben Lyon; David Manners
- Edited by: Charles Craft
- Production companies: RKO Pathė Pictures, Inc. Charles R. Rogers
- Distributed by: RKO Pathė Pictures, Inc.
- Release date: February 19, 1932
- Running time: 80 minutes
- Country: United States
- Language: English
- Budget: $541,000
- Box office: $595,000

Lady with a Past is a 1932 American pre-Code romantic comedy film starring Constance Bennett as a shy and very proper young lady who decides to invent a scandalous past for herself to spice up her life. It is based on the novel of the same name by Harriet Henry.

== Plot ==
Although she is an heiress and quite lovely, Venice Muir is very shy. She is flattered when flirtatious Donnie Wainwright urges her to elope to Paris with him, then irked when he abandons her before their ship departs.

Venice gets an idea, hiring a penniless fellow, Guy Bryson, to pretend to be a gigolo and spread word of Venice's effect on men. Soon she is the toast of Paris, suitors lining up to woo her, including Rene, a man of noble lineage. Unbeknownst to her, Rene is in serious debt. When she rejects his proposal, Rene commits suicide, enhancing Venice's reputation as a heartbreaking vixen.

Sailing back home, Venice is followed by more gossip, including some about Guy. A dazzled Donnie begins pursuing her again, finally winning over Venice without ever knowing of her ruse.

== Cast ==
- Constance Bennett as Venice Muir
- Ben Lyon as Guy Bryson
- David Manners as Donnie Wainwright
- Don Alvarado as Carlos Santiagos
- Albert Conti as Rene, the Viscomte de la Thernardier
- Merna Kennedy as Ann Duryea
- Astrid Allwyn as Lola Goadby
- Don Dillaway as Jerry
- Blanche Friderici as Nora (as Blanche Frederici)
- John Roche as Carl Howe
- Cornelius Keefe as Spaulding
- Nella Walker as Aunt Emma

== Reception ==
According to RKO records the film lost $140,000.

"There are several instances of enlivening dialogue which help to relieve the slow tempo of the whole," wrote Clara Sawdon in a review for International Photographer. "The title will undoubtedly act as an excellent decoy to attract Constance Bennett fans, however, the chief fault seeming to lie in the choice of a story not suitable for screen adaptation."
