= Medieval pageant =

Traditional procession in European folklore

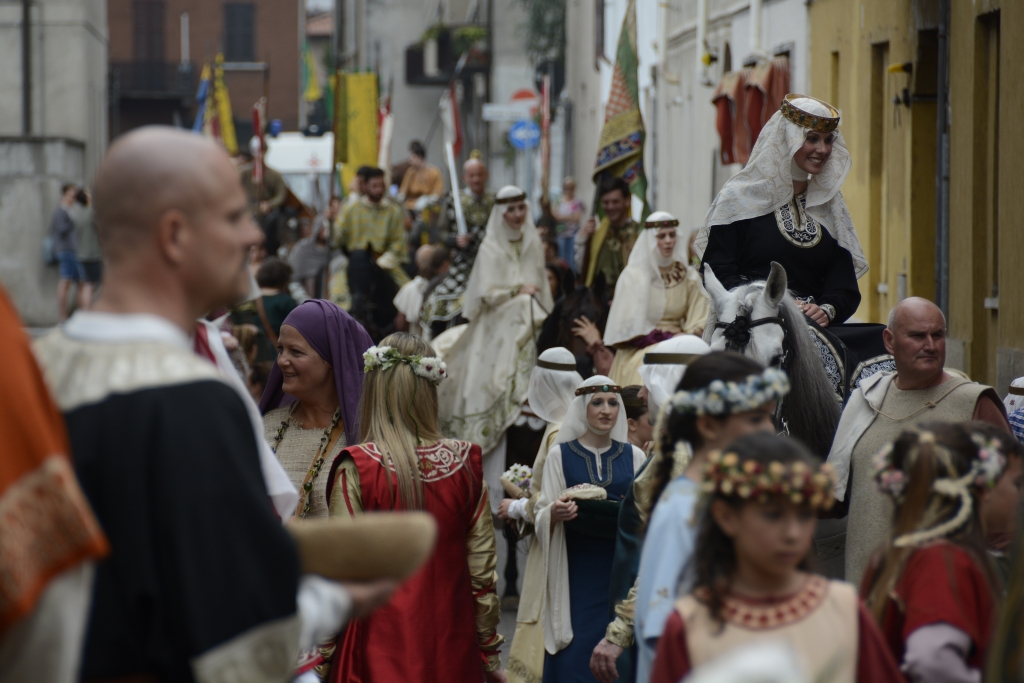
Medieval pageant of the Palio di Legnano

A medieval pageant is a form of procession traditionally associated with both secular and religious rituals, often with a narrative structure. Pageantry was an important aspect of medieval European seasonal festivals, in particular around the celebration of Corpus Christi, which began after the thirteenth century. This festival reenacted the entire history of the world, in processional performance, from the Bible's Genesis to the Apocalypse, employing hundreds of performers and mobile scenic elements. Plays were performed on mobile stages, called waggons, that traveled through towns so plays could be watched consecutively. Each waggon was sponsored by a guild who wrote, designed, and acted in the plays.

== 20th century revival ==
The form was revived in the early 20th century by the English dramatist Louis N. Parker, who staged the Sherbourne Pageant in 1905, followed by the Warwick Pageant in 1906. The success of these productions led to a proliferation of pageant plays in England in the following decades. Modern pageants depicted not just religious stories and themes, but rural life and local history as well. Notable authors of modern pageant plays include E. M. Forster and T. S. Eliot.

Other pageants in the Christian world have centered on Saints' festivals, Carnival (Mardi Gras), and Easter, while vernacular agrarian festivals have celebrated seasonal events such as the harvest, and the Summer and Winter solstices.

Also drawing on the medieval tradition, contemporary artists such as Bread and Puppet Theater, the Welfare State, In the Heart of the Beast Puppet and Mask Theatre, Spiral Q, and Superior Concept Monsters have used pageants as a potent community-based performance form.

== Notable examples ==
The processional giants and dragons (French: Géants et dragons processionnels) of Belgium and France are a set of folkloric manifestations which have been inscribed by UNESCO on the lists of Intangible Cultural Heritage in 2008, originally proclaimed in November 2005. They include:

In Belgium:

- Ducasse d'Ath
- Ducasse de Mons
- Meyboom of Brussels
- Ommegang van Dendermonde
- Ommegang van Mechelen
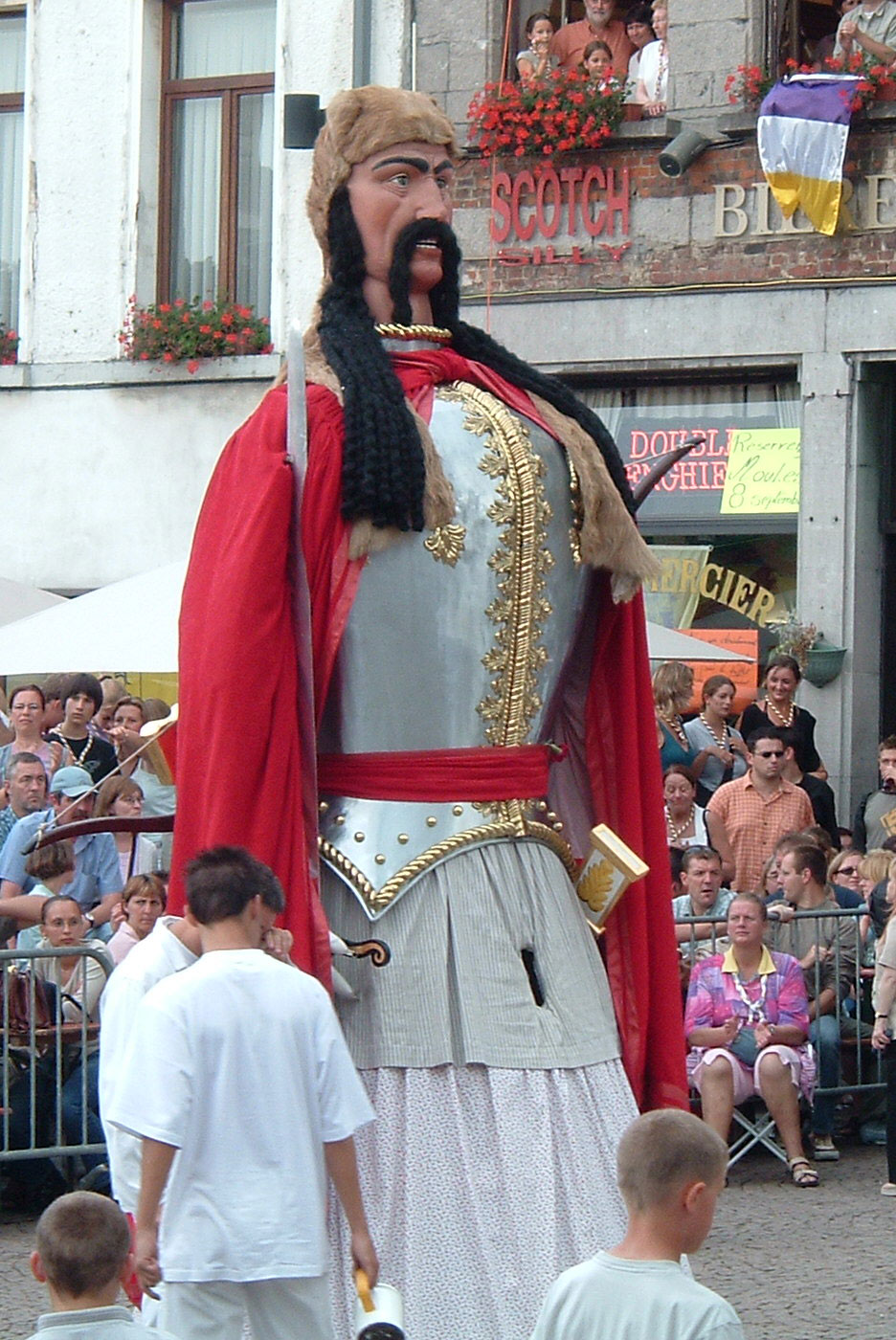
The giant Ambiorix at the Ducasse d'Ath

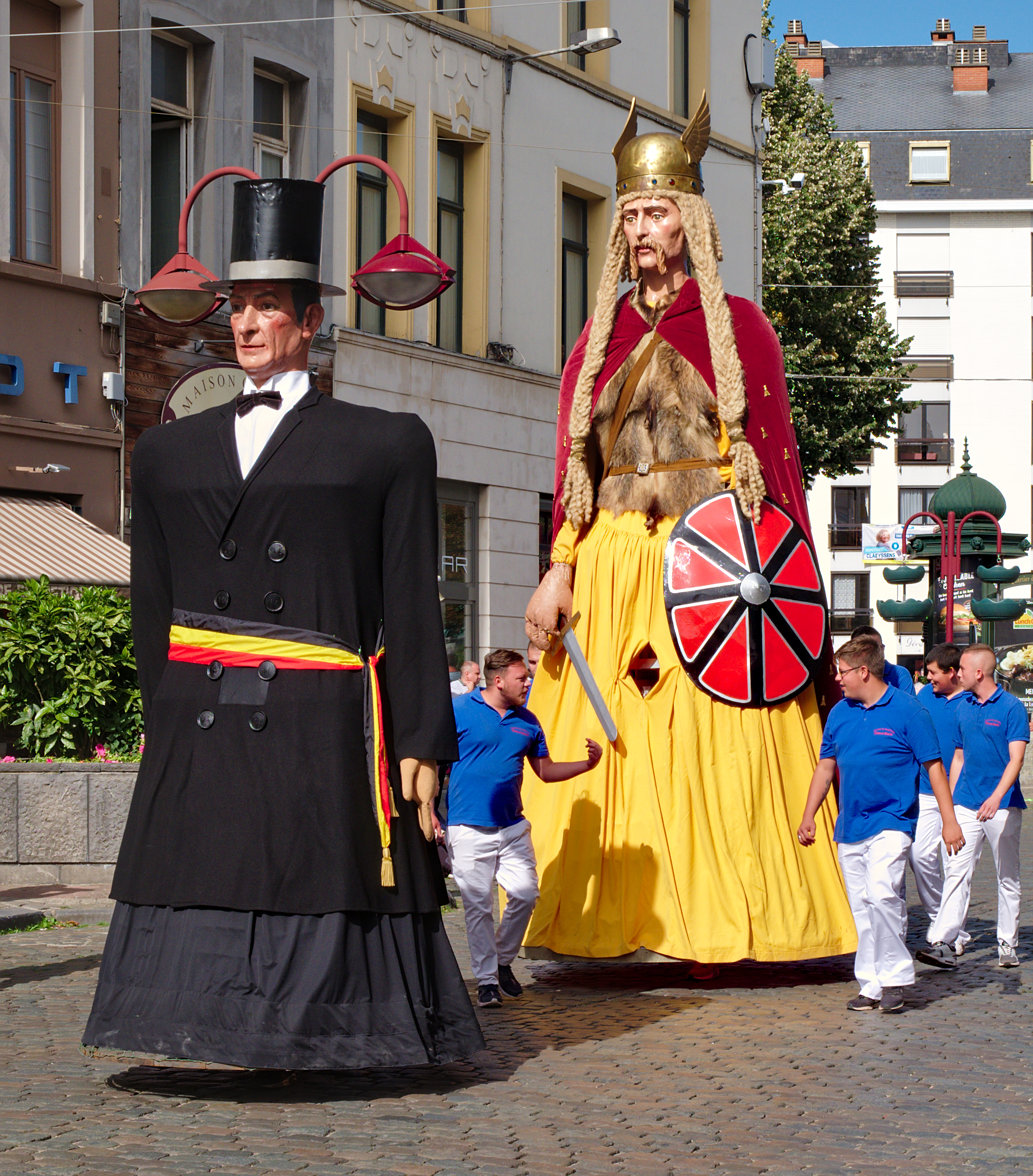
Giants of Tournai, Belgium

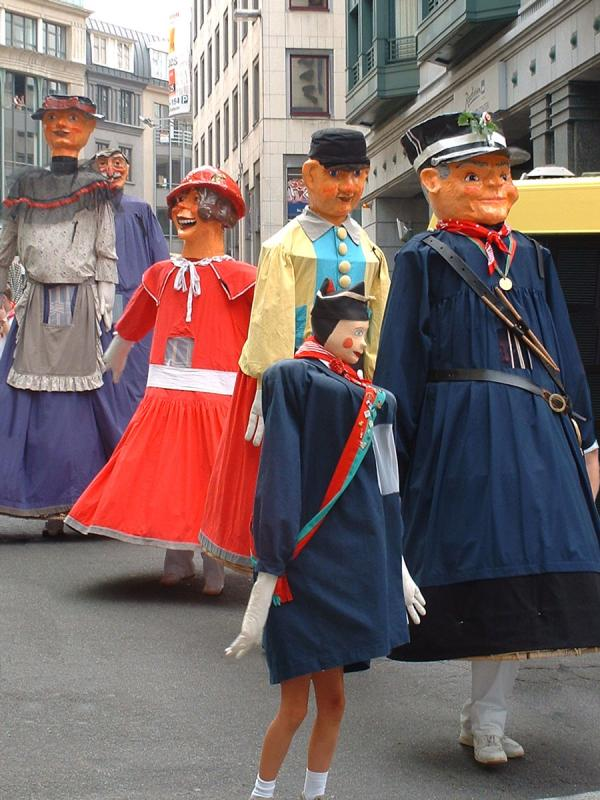
Giants of the Meyboom of Brussels

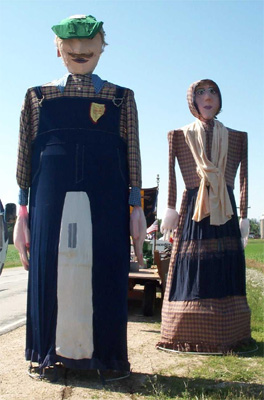
Giants of Belgian American community in Brussels, Wisconsin

In France:

- Cassel: Reuze Papa and Reuze Maman
- Douai: Gayant, Marie Cagenon, Fillon, Jacquot, Binbin
- Pézenas: le Poulain
- Tarascon: la Tarasque

== Also see ==
Mystery play - Medieval plays focused on the presentation of Bible stories in churches as tableaux with accompanying antiphonal song.
