= Constance Bennett =

American actress and producer (1904–1965)

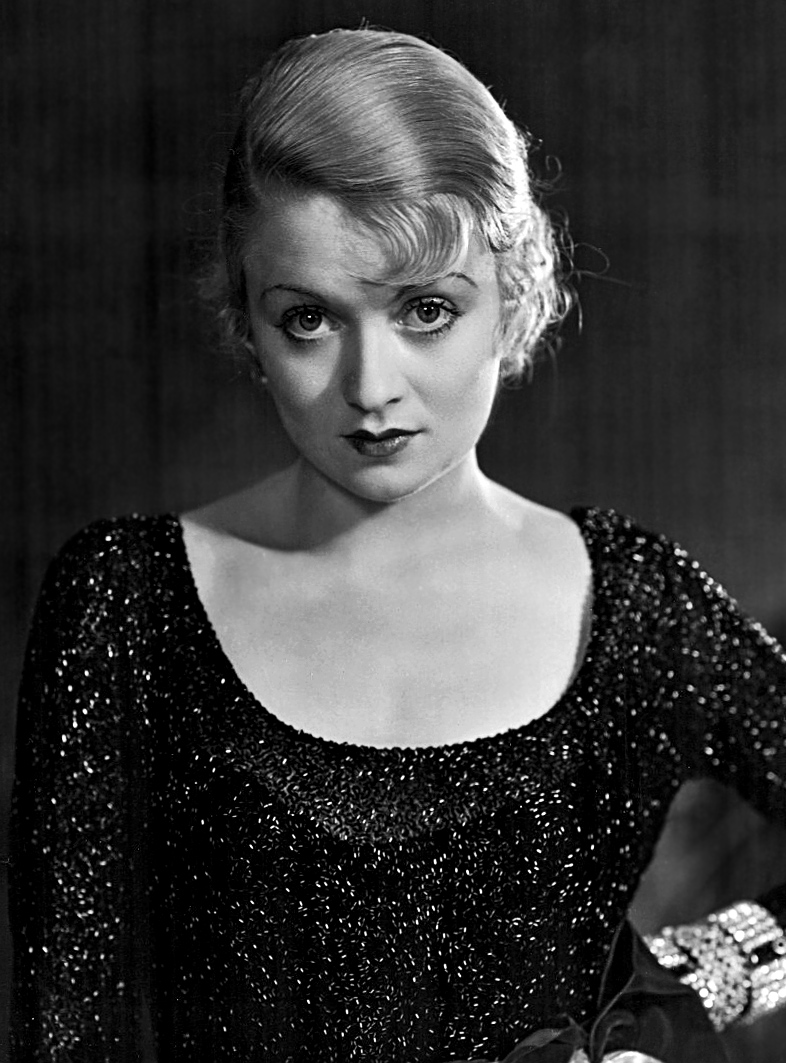
- Bennett in Rockabye (1932)
- Born: Constance Campbell Bennett; October 22, 1904; New York City, U.S.
- Died: July 24, 1965 (aged 60); Fort Dix, New Jersey, U.S.
- Resting place: Arlington National Cemetery
- Occupation: Actress
- Years active: 1916–1965
- Spouses: Chester Hirst Moorhead (m. 1921; annul. 1923) Philip Morgan Plant (m. 1925; div. 1929) Henry de la Falaise (m. 1931; div. 1940) Gilbert Roland (m. 1941; div. 1946) John Theron Coulter (m. 1946)
- Children: 3
- Parent(s): Richard Bennett; Adrienne Morrison
- Relatives: Lewis Morrison (maternal grandfather); Barbara Bennett (sister); Joan Bennett (sister); Morton Downey Jr. (nephew)

Constance Campbell Bennett (October 22, 1904 – July 24, 1965) was an American stage, film, radio, and television actress and producer. She was a major Hollywood star during the 1920s and 1930s; during the early 1930s, she was the highest-paid actress in Hollywood. Bennett frequently played society women, focusing on melodramas in the early 1930s and then taking more comedic roles in the late 1930s and 1940s. She is best remembered for her leading roles in What Price Hollywood? (1932), Bed of Roses (1933), Topper (1937), Topper Takes a Trip (1938), and had a prominent supporting role in Greta Garbo's last film, Two-Faced Woman (1941).

She was the daughter of stage and silent film star Richard Bennett, and the elder sister of actress Joan Bennett.

== Early life ==
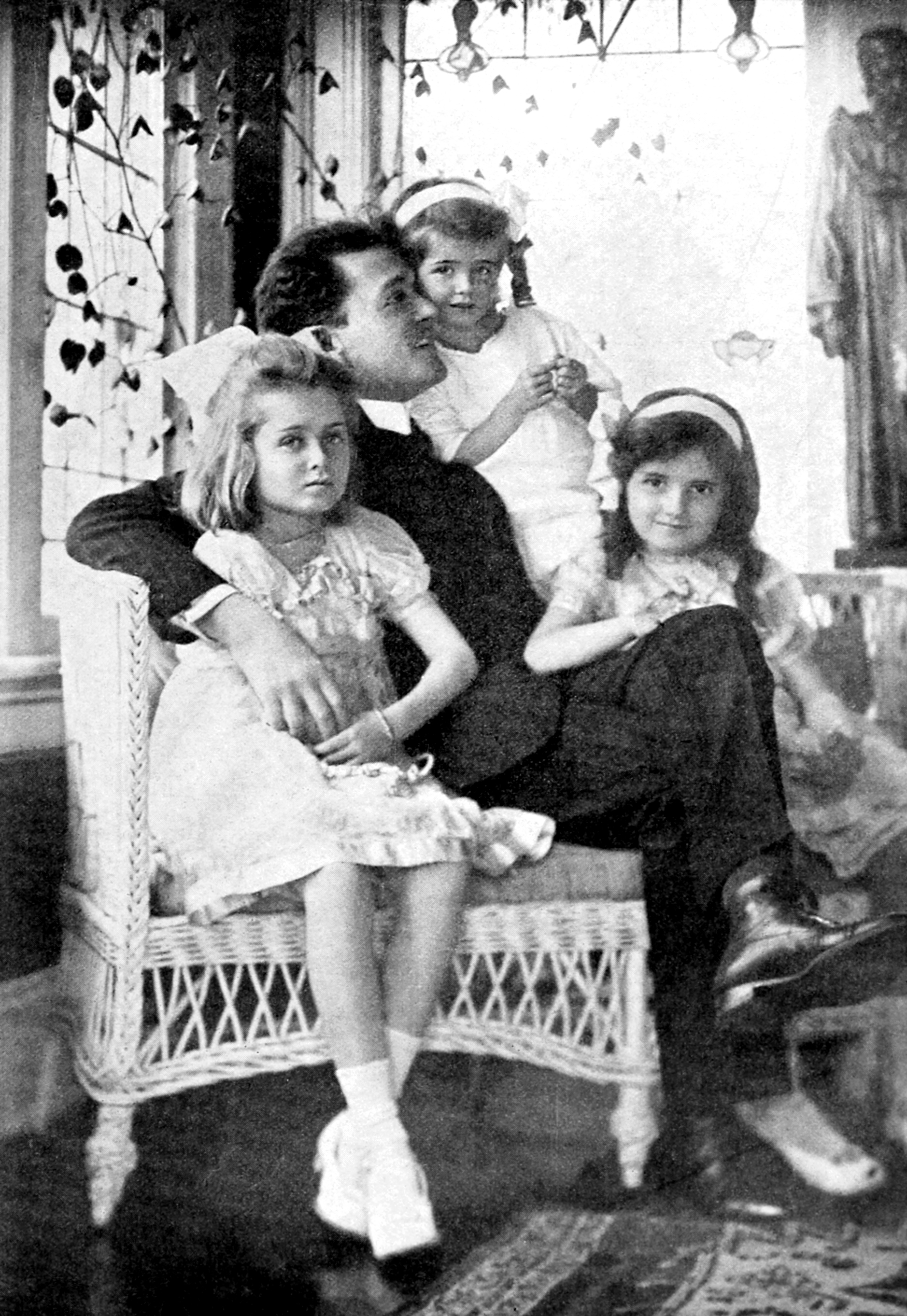
Richard Bennett in 1918 with his three daughters (from left), Constance, Joan, and Barbara

Bennett was born in New York City, the eldest of three daughters of actress Adrienne Morrison and actor Richard Bennett. Her younger sisters were actresses Joan Bennett and Barbara Bennett. All three girls attended the Chapin School in New York.

== Career ==
After some time spent in a convent, Bennett entered acting. Constance, the first Bennett sister to enter motion pictures, appeared in silent films produced in New York, before a meeting with Samuel Goldwyn led to her Hollywood debut in Cytherea (1924). She abandoned a career in silent films for marriage to Philip Plant in 1925 but resumed her film career after their divorce in 1929, at the advent of talking pictures.

In the early 1930s, Bennett was frequently among the top actresses named in audience popularity and box-office polls. In 1931, a short-lived contract with Metro-Goldwyn-Mayer earned her $300,000 for two movies which included The Easiest Way and made her one of the highest-paid stars in Hollywood. Warner Brothers paid her the all-time high salary of $30,000 a week for Bought! in 1931. Richard Bennett, her father, was also cast in this film.

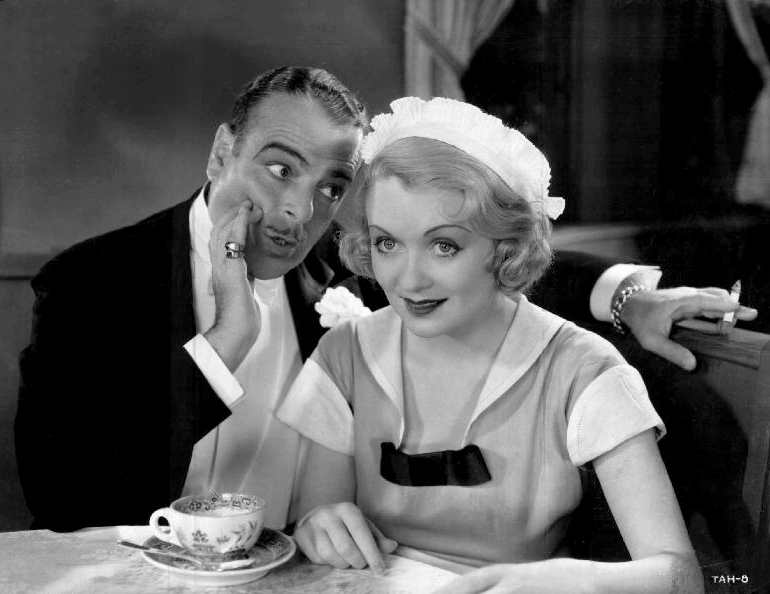
Lowell Sherman and Bennett in What Price Hollywood? (1932)

The next year she moved to RKO, where she acted in What Price Hollywood? (1932), directed by George Cukor, a behind-the-scenes look at the Hollywood studio system, in which she portrayed a waitress who becomes a movie star. Lowell Sherman co-starred as the film director who discovers her, and Neil Hamilton as the wealthy playboy she marries who later divorces her. The film Morning Glory had been written with Bennett in mind for the lead role, but producer Pandro S. Berman gave the role to Katharine Hepburn, who won an Academy Award for her performance.

During her time at RKO, Bennett briefly became the highest-paid actress in Hollywood. RKO controlled the careers of actresses Ann Harding and Helen Twelvetrees in a similar manner, hoping to duplicate Bennett's success.

Bennett next showed her versatility in the likes of Our Betters (1933), writer/director Gregory La Cava's Bed of Roses (1933) with Pert Kelton, After Tonight (1933, co-starring with future husband Gilbert Roland), The Affairs of Cellini (1934), After Office Hours (1935) with Clark Gable, Topper (1937, as Marian Kerby opposite Cary Grant, a role she repeated in the 1938 sequel, Topper Takes a Trip), the madcap family comedy Merrily We Live (1938) and Two-Faced Woman (1941, supporting Greta Garbo).

By the 1940s, Bennett was working less frequently in film but was in demand in both radio and theatre. She had her own program, Constance Bennett Calls on You AKA The Constance Bennett Show, on ABC radio in 1945–1946.

She had a major supporting role in The Unsuspected (1947), in which she played Jane Moynihan, the program director who helps prove that radio host Victor Grandison (Claude Rains) is guilty of murder. In the 1950s, As Young as You Feel (1951) found her playing opposite Marilyn Monroe. Bennett played herself in a cameo in It Should Happen to You (1954). In 1957–1958, she toured the United States in the title role of Auntie Mame. Bennett made her final screen appearance in the 1965 film Madame X (released posthumously in 1966), as the blackmailing mother-in-law.

== Personal life ==
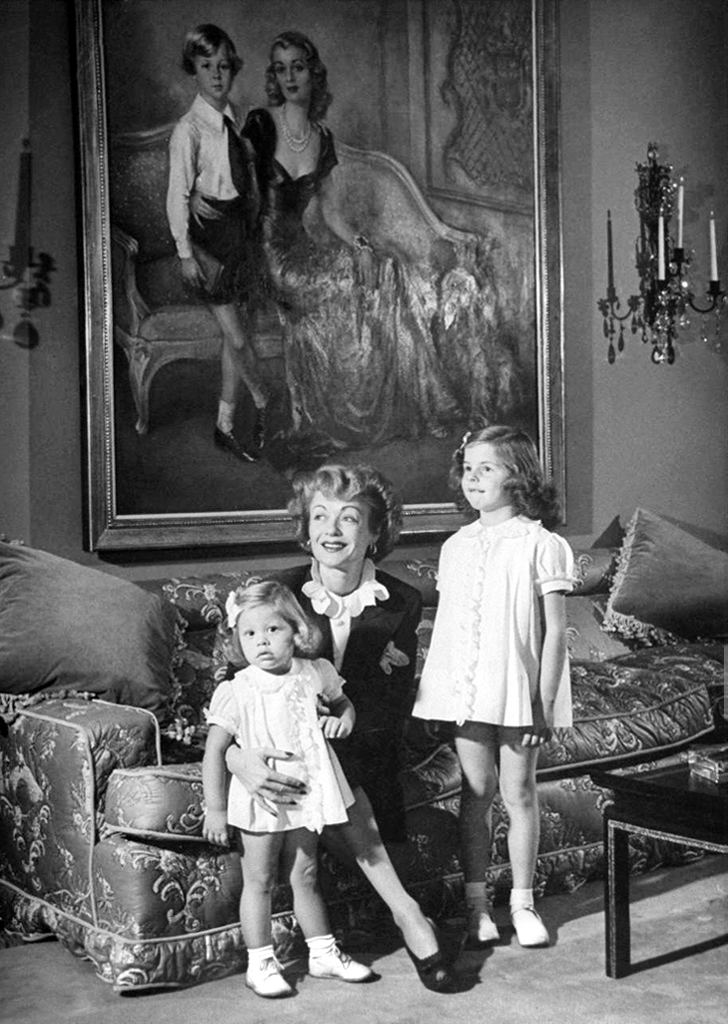
Bennett and her daughters with painting (background) of her and her son, 1944

Bennett was married five times and had three children.

=== Chester Hirst Moorehead ===
On June 15, 1921, Bennett eloped with Chester Hirst Moorehead of Chicago, a student at the University of Virginia who was the son of oral surgeon Frederick Moorehead. They were married by a justice of the peace in Greenwich, Connecticut. Bennett was 16 at the time. (Note: An article in The Ogden Standard-Examiner in 1923 said, "They succeeded in convincing the authorities there [Greenwich, Connecticut] that she was twenty-one, instead of the bare sixteen she looked and was") (Note: An article in the Springfield Missouri Republican in 1925 also reported the misrepresentation of Bennett's age.) A New York Times article reporting the elopement observed: "The parents of Miss Bennett were opposed to their marriage at this time solely on account of their youth." The marriage was annulled in 1923. (Note: An article in the Springfield Missouri Republican in 1925 said, "Three days later the marriage was annulled")

=== Philip Morgan Plant ===
Bennett's next serious relationship was with millionaire socialite Philip Morgan Plant. Her parents planned a cruise to Europe, taking Constance with them, to separate the couple. As the ship was preparing to leave port, however, the Bennetts saw Plant and his parents boarding, too. A contemporary newspaper article reported, "Now the little beauty and the heir to all the Plant millions were assured a week of the cosy intimacy which an ocean liner affords." In November 1925, the two eloped and were married in Greenwich, Connecticut, by the same justice of the peace who officiated at Bennett's wedding to Moorehead. They divorced in a French court in 1929.

In 1932, Bennett returned from Europe with a three-year-old child, whom she claimed to have adopted and named Peter Bennett Plant (born 1929). In 1942, however, during a battle over a large trust fund established to benefit any descendants of her former husband, Bennett announced that her adopted son actually was her natural child by Plant, born after the divorce and kept hidden to ensure that the child's biological father did not get custody. During the court hearings, the actress told her former mother-in-law and her husband's widow that "if she got to the witness stand she would give a complete account of her life with Plant." The matter was settled out of court.

=== Henri de la Falaise ===
In 1931, Bennett made headlines when she married one of Gloria Swanson's former husbands, Henri le Bailly, the Marquis de La Coudraye de La Falaise, a French nobleman and film director. She and de la Falaise founded Bennett Pictures Corp. and co-produced two films which were the Hollywood films shot in the two-strip Technicolor process, Legong: Dance of the Virgins (1935) filmed on location in Bali, and Kilou the Killer Tiger (1936), filmed in Indochina. The couple divorced in Reno, Nevada, in 1940.

=== Gilbert Roland ===
Bennett's fourth marriage was to actor Gilbert Roland. They were married in 1941 and she adopted his two daughters, sculptor Lorinda "Lynda" and Christina "Gyl". (Note: Bennett's obituary in the Independent gives the daughters' names as "Lynda and Gyl".) They divorced in 1946, with Bennett winning custody of their children.

=== John Theron Coulter ===
Later in 1946, Bennett married for the fifth and final time to US Air Force Colonel John Theron Coulter. After her marriage, she concentrated her efforts on providing relief entertainment to US troops still stationed in Europe, winning military honors for her services. Bennett and Coulter remained married for the rest of her life. Bennett supported Barry Goldwater in the 1964 United States presidential election.

=== Death ===
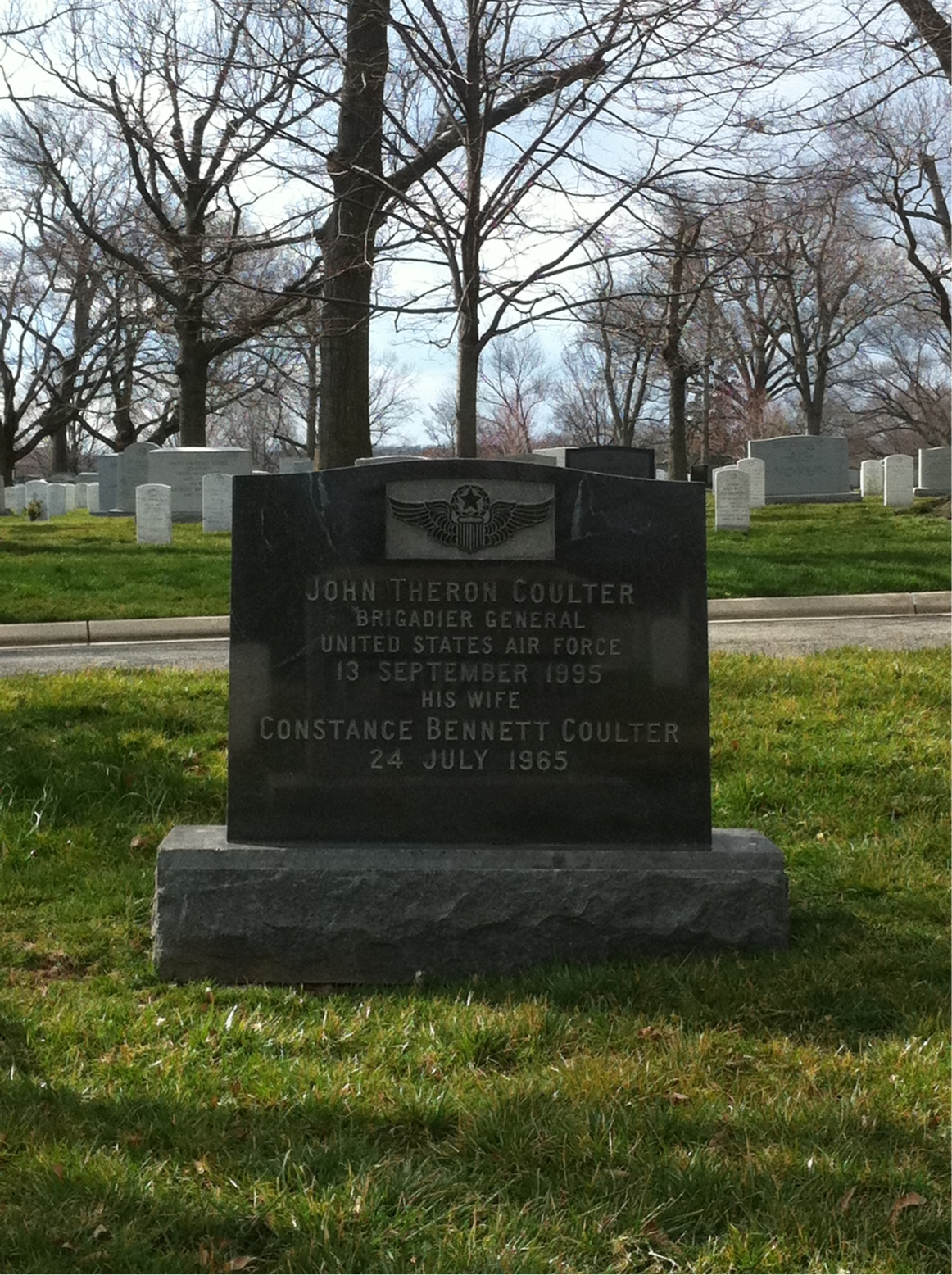
Bennett's grave at Arlington National Cemetery

Bennett died on July 24, 1965, aged 60. As the wife of John Theron Coulter, who had achieved the rank of brigadier general, she was buried in Arlington National Cemetery. Coulter died in 1995 and was buried with her.

== Legacy ==
Bennett has a motion pictures star on the Hollywood Walk of Fame for her contributions to the film industry. Her star is located at 6250 Hollywood Boulevard, a short distance from the star of her sister, Joan.

== Filmography ==
Silent films
Year	Title	Role	Notes
1916	The Valley of Decision	Unborn soul	Lost film
1922	Reckless Youth	Chorus Girl	
1922	Evidence	Edith	Lost film
1922	What's Wrong with the Women?	Elise Bascom	Lost film
1924	Cytherea	Annette Sherman	Lost film
1924	Into the Net	Madge Clayton, his sister	
1925	The Goose Hangs High	Lois Ingals	Lost film
1925	Code of the West	Georgie May	Lost film
1925	My Son	Betty Smith	Lost film
1925	My Wife and I	Aileen Alton	Lost film
1925	The Goose Woman	Hazel Woods	
1925	Wandering Fires	Guerda Anthony	
1925	Sally, Irene and Mary	Sally	
1925	The Pinch Hitter	Abby Nettleton	
1926	Married?	Marcia Livingston	

Sound films
Year	Title	Role	Notes
1929	Rich People	Connie Hayden	
1929	This Thing Called Love	Ann Marvin	Lost film
1930	Son of the Gods	Allana	
1930	Three Faces East	Frances Hawtree / Z-1	
1930	Common Clay	Ellen Neal	
1930	Sin Takes a Holiday	Sylvia Brenner	
1931	The Easiest Way	Laura Murdock	
1931	Born to Love	Doris Kendall	
1931	The Common Law	Valerie West	
1931	Bought!	Stephanie Dale	
1932	Screen Snapshots	Herself	Short subject
1932	Lady with a Past	Venice Muir	
1932	What Price Hollywood?	Mary Evans	
1932	Two Against the World	Miss Adele 'Dell' Hamilton	
1932	Rockabye	Judy Carroll	
1933	Our Betters	Lady Pearl Grayston	
1933	Bed of Roses	Lorry Evans	
1933	After Tonight	Carla Vanirska, aka K-14 and Karen Schöntag	
1934	Moulin Rouge	Helen Hall / Raquel	
1934	The Affairs of Cellini	Duchess of Florence	
1934	Outcast Lady	Iris	
1935	After Office Hours	Sharon Norwood	
1935	Legong		Producer only
1935	Starlit Days at the Lido	Herself	Short subject
1936	Everything Is Thunder	Anna von Stucknadel	
1936	Ladies in Love	Yoli Haydn	
1937	Daily Beauty Rituals	Herself	Short subject
1937	Topper	Marion Kerby	
1938	Merrily We Live	Jerry Kilbourne	
1938	Service de Luxe	Helen Murphy	
1938	Topper Takes a Trip	Marion Kerby	
1939	Tail Spin	Gerry Lester	
1940	Escape to Glory	Christine Blaine	
1941	Law of the Tropics	Joan Madison	
1941	Picture People No. 2: Hollywood Sports	Herself	Short subject
1941	Two-Faced Woman	Griselda Vaughn	
1942	Wild Bill Hickok Rides	Belle Andrews	
1942	Hedda Hopper's Hollywood No. 5	Herself	Short subject
1942	Sin Town	Kye Allen	
1942	Madame Spy	Joan Bannister	
1945	Paris Underground	Kitty de Mornay	Also produced
1946	Centennial Summer	Zenia Lascalles	
1947	The Unsuspected	Jane Moynihan	
1948	Smart Woman	Paula Rogers	
1948	Angel on the Amazon	Dr. Karen Lawrence	
1951	As Young as You Feel	Lucille McKinley	
1954	It Should Happen to You	Guest Panelist	
1966	Madame X	Estelle	Released posthumously
