= Pageant of Empire =

The Pageant of Empire was the name given to various historical pageants celebrating the British Empire which were held in Britain during the early twentieth century. For example, there was a small Pageant of Empire at the town of Builth Wells in 1909. In 1911 a giant Pageant of Empire took place at the Festival of Empire at the Crystal Palace in Sydenham, where thousands of amateur performers acted out historical scenes. The most notable was the Pageant of Empire which took place in London in 1924.

== The London 1924 Pageant of Empire ==
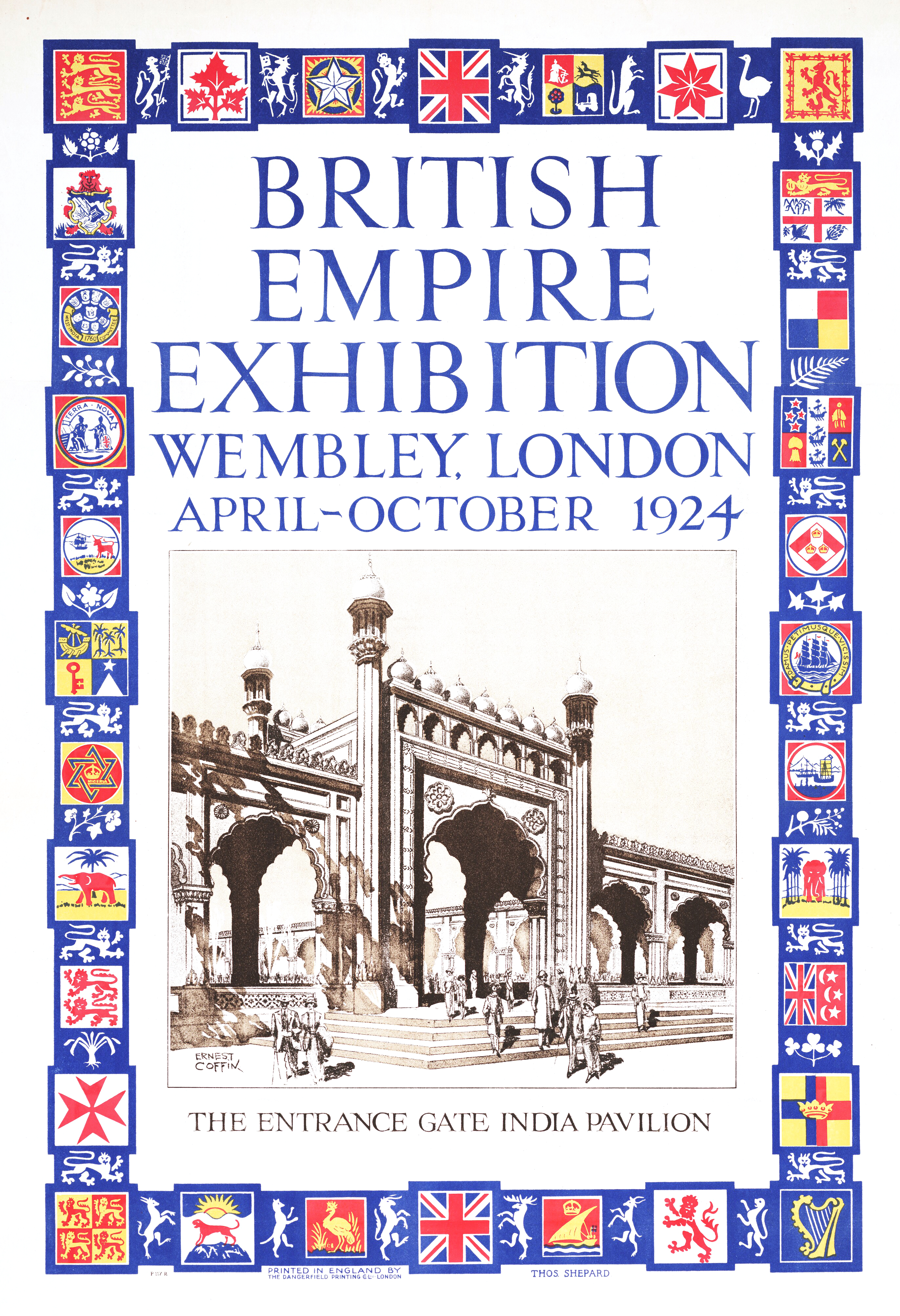
1924 poster

The most elaborate pageant was in London in 1924. It was directed by pageant master Frank Lascelles on behalf of the British government, for the huge British Empire Exhibition held at the Empire Stadium (later Wembley Stadium), Wembley Park. The Exhibition was opened on 23 April 1924, and the Pageant was performed between 21 July and 30 August. Its full title was The Pageant of Empire: An Historical Epic.

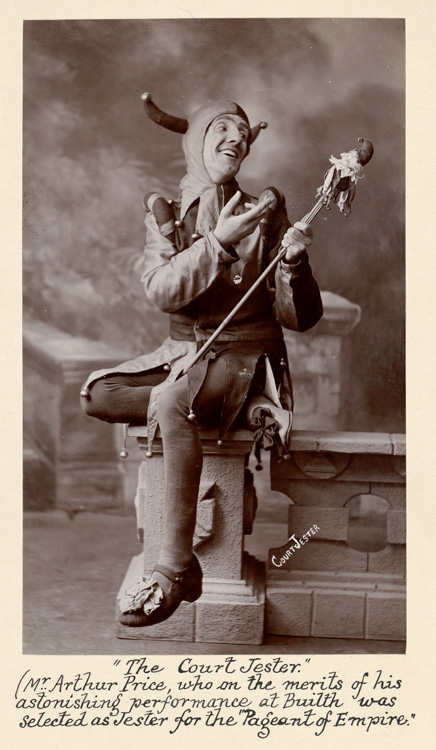
Arthur Price, selected as a court jester for the Pageant of Empire at Builth Wells in 1909

The 1924 Pageant had a cast of 15,000 people, 300 horses, 500 donkeys, 730 camels, 72 monkeys, 1000 doves, seven elephants, three bears and one macaw. It took three days to see the whole performance.

The music for the pageants was selected by Henry Jaxon, assisted by Ignatius de Orellana. There was an orchestra of over a hundred musicians selected from three London orchestras. The large choir was selected from local choral societies, who gave their services free. The scenery was designed by Frank Brangwyn.

The pageants included "The Days of Queen Elizabeth", "The English Fleet in the Mediterranean - Blake and the Barbary Pirates", "George III and the Departure of Captain Cook" and "A Pageant of Heroes". There were pageants for the countries of the Empire: South Africa, India, New Zealand and Australia, and the first musical item in each was a poem by Alfred Noyes set to music by Edward Elgar. Other composers represented (they were all British) included Eric Coates (Merrymakers overture), Edward German (a song from Merrie England), Percy Fletcher (Sylvan Scenes), Henry Smart, Samuel Coleridge-Taylor (Bamboula), Hubert Parry (War and Peace), Alexander Mackenzie (Britannia overture), Hamish MacCunn, Liza Lehmann, Amy Woodforde-Finden (Indian Love Lyrics), Herman Finck, Granville Bantock, Leslie Stuart, Arthur Sullivan (Imperial March) and Edwin Lemare (Solemn March for organ). The concluding pageants were "A Pageant of Heroes" and "An Empire's Thanksgiving". For "A Pageant of Heroes" there were settings of Alfred Noyes' poem "The Immortal Legions", and Laurence Binyon's "With Proud Thanksgiving" both set to music by Elgar. For "The Empire's Thanksgiving", an "Anthem of the Sister Nations" by Laurence Binyon was set to music by Nicholas Gatty, and there was a recitation of "Recessional" by Rudyard Kipling set to music by Herbert Bunning.

Three movements from Elgar's "The Crown of India" were included in the pageant representing "The Early Days of India": the Introduction, the March of the Mogul Emperors and the Crown of India March.

Pageant of Empire is also the title given to the set of songs, to words by Alfred Noyes, written by Sir Edward Elgar and included in the Pageant. Elgar conducted the massed choirs at the opening ceremony of the Exhibition, including Land of Hope and Glory, but the songs were not performed there until 21 July, when they were conducted by the composer.

Elgar composed his Empire March for the same occasion, and this march was at the time considered part of the Pageant of Empire. However, the Empire March was not performed then and Elgar's Imperial March took its place.

== See also ==
- Empire Day

== Recordings ==
- The CD with the book Oh, My Horses! Elgar and the Great War has many historical recordings, including two of the songs from Pageant of Empire
