= Warwick Pageant =

The Warwick Pageant was a huge drama festival, organised by Louis N. Parker, which took place in the grounds of Warwick Castle, England, in July 1906 and was later described as “the biggest thing which ever happened to Warwick”.

== Development ==
The pageant was performed in the grounds of Warwick Castle, England, during the week of 2 to 7 July 1906 and was a major undertaking. In 1905 the Warwick town authorities had approached Louis N. Parker (see below) and asked him to “add another triumph” to that which he had achieved with the Sherborne Pageant in Dorset, even though that one only used 820 performers. The excuse for the Warwick Pageant was that it should celebrate “the Commemoration of the Thousandth Anniversary of the Conquest of Mercia by Queen Ethelfleda”.

The front cover of the original Pageant souvenir brochure

It was a leading principle that, as far as possible, everything used in the pageant should be designed and made in Warwick. There were two thousand performers, and three hundred ladies made 1,400 of the costumes. Forty amateur artists painted copies of mediaeval banners for Churches and Guilds, in addition to producing elaborate designs on materials for costumes. Most of this work was done in a property in Jury Street, Warwick that became known as Pageant House, by which name it is still known today. From the start it was to be “clearly understood that those participating in the Pageant as performers would do so anonymously”.

A wooden grandstand was constructed which could hold an audience of 4,800 people. It was designed to be “in one gentle slope at an angle that collects the sound waves and delivers them distinctly to the very back of the stand, which is 280 feet long”.

== Librettist statement ==
The pageant secured almost universally ecstatic press reviews. Louis N. Parker explained what inspired him:

In arranging the Warwick Pageant I have clung as closely as the exigencies of time and space would allow to history and tradition. My chief authorities have been The Countess of Warwick’s “Warwick Castle” and Mr Thomas Kemp’s “A History of Warwick and its People”, but I have used “The Black Book of Warwick” and “The Book of John Fisher” very freely. I have also taken hints from “The Rowl of Master John Rows of Warrewyk” and I am acquainted with Dugdale, Field, Smith, Rivington, Burgess and a number of minor pamphlets. I think I may say I have some sort of authority for every action represented, if not for every word spoken. I have been specially favoured in my Collaborators. My old and tried friend Mr James Rhoades has dignified the whole Pageant with his verse; Mr Edward Hicks, not content with helping me in all sorts of ways with extraordinary patience and enthusiasm, has also contributed the greater part of the First Episode; The Rev W. T. Keeling, Headmaster of Warwick School, has written a Latin Carmen which I expect the school will be singing centuries hence; Miss Ahrons has exercised her graceful muse in the service of the High School for Girls; and I wish to express my very particular thanks to the authors of Episodes VI and VII – Kit Marlowe and William Shakespeare.

== The performers ==
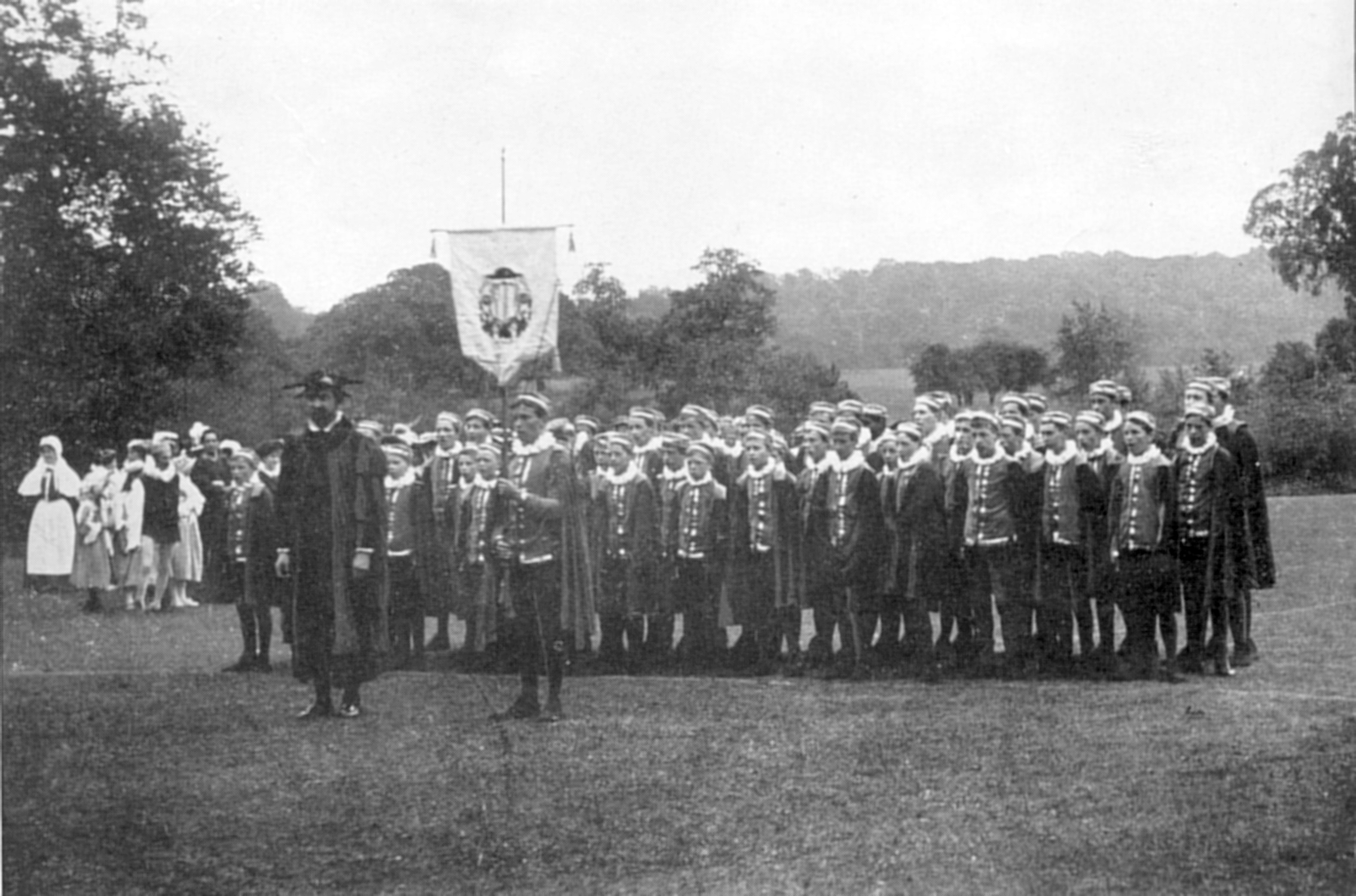
Robert Davies (acting headmaster) and the entire pupil body of Warwick School performing at the Pageant

As explained above, the programme did not contain the names of the players, and their identities are only revealed in press reviews:

The Players: The following ladies and gentlemen played the leading parts:

Kymbeline: Mr Holte

Caradoc: Mr Sutton

Ethelfleda: Miss Dickens

Piers Gaveston: Mr Rybot

Lancaster: Mr Robb

Warwick: Mr H. Brown

Roger de Newburgh: Mr C. Brown

Gundrada: Miss Browne

Shakespeare: A boy from Stratford

Queen Elizabeth: Mrs H. Batchelor

Leicester: Earl of Yarmouth

Thomas Fisher: Mr Sam Browne

Mrs Tomas Fisher: Mrs Sam Browne

Recorder: Mr Kemp (Mayor of Warwick)

There also took part in various episodes Lord and Lady Willoughby de Broke, Lady Heath, Lady Victoria de Trafford and the Rev Ralph Goodenough.

== The music ==
With the exception of the Carmen, sang while the boys of Warwick School were performing (which piece forms the school song to this day), all the music of the Pageant was composed by Allen K. Blackall, the music master at the King's County School in The Butts, organist of St Mary’s, later music master at Warwick School (1906–27) and Principal of the Birmingham School of Music from 1934 to 1945. Warwick School possesses the autograph orchestral parts for the Pageant March, which is presumably the “Solemn March” which opened the proceedings each night, performed in 1906 by a “hidden orchestra” and also the Band of the 2nd Battalion, The Royal Warwickshire Regiment.

== The film ==
Two reels of a film of the pageant survive, and were copied into a 16mm format in 1957. The contents of the film are given in the National Film Archive Catalogue:

A record of the pageant held in the grounds of Warwick Castle in 1906, depicting incidents in Warwick history from AD40 to 1572.

Reel 1. Shots of Warwick Castle and the grounds showing the rope ferry in operation and the Old Mill and weir (32-173):

Episode 1; a procession of Druids round an altar (174-219): the priests light the sacrificial fires (259): a child is seized and walled in under the altar (287): King Carodoc orders his release (305): a battle between Romans and Britons (308): King Caradoc is taken prisoner by the Romans (363):

Episode 2; The Bear and Ragged Staff: The Britons enter with Arthal and Movid leading a bear and a tree trunk (366-406):

Episode 3; Ethelfleda AD 906: Queen Ethelfleda arrives with a number of captive Danes (411-461):

Episode 4; Guy of Warwick AD 920: Guy returns to Phyllida and tells her he has slain the Dun Cow (464-488): the Dun Cow's head is brought in, Guy and Phyllida are betrothed and led in triumph to church (529):

Episode 5; Roger de Newburgh AD 1123: Roger returns with the Templar Knights and surprises Lady Gunrada playing with her Maids of Honour (535-553):

Episode 6; Based on Scenes from Marlowe's "Edward II" - PIERS GAVESTON AD 1312: Gaveston is created Lord High Chamberlain by the King (563-594): the Bishop of Coventry enters and is degraded by Gaveston (634): Gaveston is seized as a disturber of the peace (653): he is tried by his peers (679): he is led off by the executioner (684):

Episode 7; The Kingmaker (Shakespeare AD 1464): King Louis of France receives Queen Margaret, Warwick who is present hears the news of King Edward's marriage (690-719): Louis and his retinue depart (759): Warwick, having returned, seizes Edward (782):

Episode 8; The Charters AD 1564: the Charter being given to Warwick School (788-817): Ambrose Dudley arrives (830):

Episode 9: The Nine Days Queen AD 1533: Thomas Fisher is condemned to death for treason, but is saved by Dame Fisher who falls on his breast as the soldiers are about to fire; the captain of the soldiers frees them both (836-844):

Reel 2: Episode 10; Elizabeth AD 1572: a scrivener is put in the stocks (849-867): a meeting of councillors at Stratford (875): a procession with the Earl of Leycester (923): Queen Elizabeth arrives at Warwick Castle (940): Leycester kisses her hand (973): the Queen holds court (1010): the boys of King's County School, Warwick cheer the Queen (1020): boys and girls perform a pastoral dance before the Queen (1100): the Queen leaves for the island in the Avon by barge (1174): the Queen returns and disembarks (1307):

The March Past: all the characters in the pageant form a procession and march past the camera (1312–1585) The End (1588).

== Pageant House ==
The large house next to the Court House in Jury Street, Warwick, belonged in the nineteenth century to the influential Greenway family, and by 1850 its garden had extended behind the Court House to a gateway into Castle Street. George Cattell Greenway became Town Clerk and a partner with his brother Kelynge Greenway, in Greenway, Smith and Greenways Bank; both were implicated in the bank’s spectacular failure in 1887 and served terms in jail. The house was on the market at the time of the Pageant, and No. 2 Jury Street was used in 1905 and 1906 for the purposes of the Pageant by the generosity of Sir E. Montague Nelson. Afterwards it was bought with the proceeds and presented to the town; it became the Pageant House and its enlarged garden, the Pageant Garden, is now a much valued green oasis in the town centre, and is widely used for wedding photographs.

== Parker biography ==
Louis Napoleon Parker was born in Calvados, France, of American parents in 1852. At the age of 17, he entered the Royal Academy of Music in London and was Director of Music at Sherborne School, Dorset from 1874 to 1892. His first Pageant was held in the grounds of Sherborne Castle, in 1905, to celebrate “1,200 years of the town, the bishopric and the school”, followed by Warwick in 1906 and Bury St Edmunds in 1907. 1908 saw him in Dover, and in 1909 Colchester and York. He announced in 1911 that more than 15,000 performers had gone through his hands, and audiences had reached a quarter of a million – and $75,000 had gone to charities… After developing this hugely successful genre from nothing, he let others take over – indeed “Pageantitis” had swept over Britain, and rivals started their own shows, starting at Oxford in 1907. After about 1910 Louis N. Parker concentrated once more on being a playwright. In 1913 Emma Angeline Armstrong, a playwright from Minneapolis, brought a plagiarism charge in Federal Court against Parker, claiming that his pageant play Joseph and His Brethren was stolen from her play At the Foot of the Throne. He died in 1944, in Devon.
