= Frank Lascelles (pageant master) =

British pageant master and artist (1875–1934)

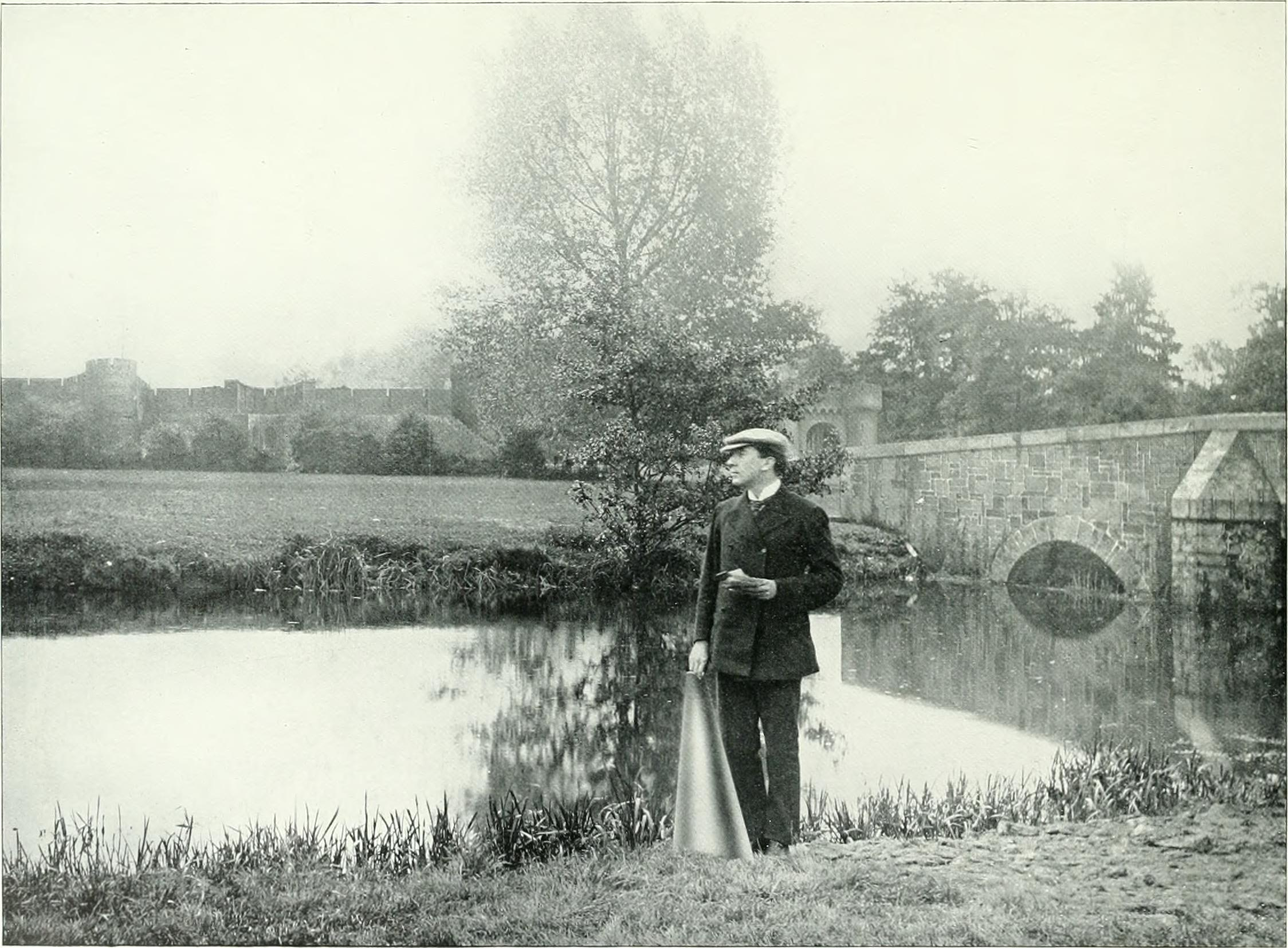
- Mr. Frank Lascelles, the organiser and producer of the Oxford Historical Pageant,
- Born: Frank William Thomas Charles Stevens; 30 July 1875; Sibford Gower, Oxfordshire
- Died: 23 May 1934 (aged 58); Brighton, East Sussex
- Other names: Tehonikonraka; (Honorary chief of the Iroquois)
- Education: Keble College, Oxford
- Occupations: Pageant Master and sculptor
- Known for: Tercentenary of Canada at Quebec City; Festival of Empire at The Crystal Palace; Coronation Durbar at Delhi; British Empire Exhibition at Wembley Park

Frank William Thomas Charles Lascelles (30 July 1875 – 23 May 1934) was a British pageant master and artist, known as the "man who staged the Empire."

== Early life ==
Lascelles was born in the Oxfordshire village of Sibford Gower with the surname of Stevens, the son of Rev. Edward Thomas Stevens, the village priest. He was educated at the village school before attending Keble College, Oxford, where he became the most notable member of Oxford's dramatic society. After leaving the university without a degree, he worked as an actor in London between 1904 and 1906 at Sir Herbert Beerbohm Tree's His Majesty's theatre. It was during this time that he changed his name from Stevens to Lascelles.

== Career ==
Lascelles staged his first pageant in 1907. The Oxford Historical was a success, despite initial reservations by the University authorities and a student riot. The following year he organised the celebrations for the Tercentenary of Canada at Quebec City. Lascelles enlisted the services of the Iroquois and was made an honorary chief under the name of Tehonikonraka, "the man of infinite resource". In 1909 he was Master of Pageantry at the celebration of the opening of the Union Parliament of South Africa in Cape Town. The following year he organised the Pageant of London, performed by a cast of 15,000. In 1912 Lascelles was Master of the Pageant at the Coronation Durbar at Calcutta with the participation of over 300,000 Indians and British Army troops. In 1923 he was Master of the Harrow Pageant and the following year Master of the Bristol Pageant (Cradle of the Empire) and the Pageant of Empire at the British Empire Exhibition. Lascelles' imperial triumphs earned him the epithet "the man who staged the empire".

He was also a sculptor, and among his subjects were the Prince of Wales, the Duke of Connaught, Earl Grey and the Aga Khan. Several of his sculptures are displayed in prominent positions across the former Empire. He sculpted a memorial to his mother in the church at Sibford Gower, as well as painting a Roll of Honour. He also contributed prose and verse to periodicals. In 1932 the Earl of Darnley compiled Our Modern Orpheus, a volume of essays paying tribute to Lascelles.

== Personal life ==
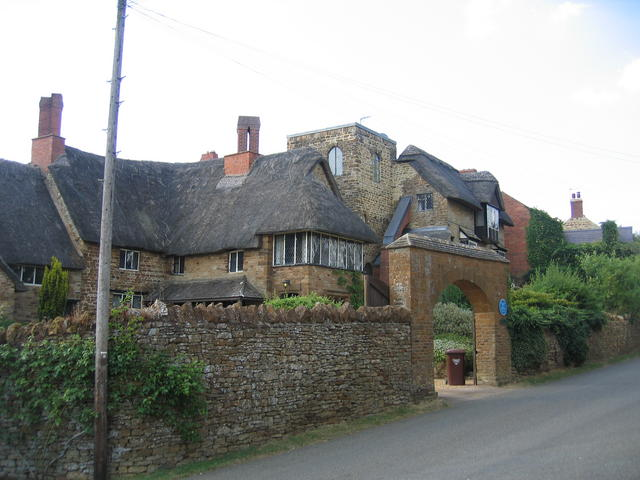
The 'manor house' which Lascelles created for himself in Sibford Gower, Oxfordshire

Lascelles was always anxious to hide his humble origins. He assumed the title "Lord of the Manor" in Sibford Gower, Oxfordshire, where he devised a novel "manor house" for himself. He was well-connected, and regularly entertained guests such as Ivor Novello, who wrote the popular song Keep the Home Fires Burning while staying with Lascelles in Sibford.

Towards the end of his life, ill health restricted Lascelles' finances and he died in poverty on 23 May 1934 in rented rooms in Brighton. He never married.
