= Louis N. Parker =

English dramatist, composer and translator (1852–1944)

- Parker in 1917
- Born: 21 October 1852; Luc-sur-Mer, Calvados, France
- Died: 21 September 1944 (aged 91); Bishopsteignton, Devon, England
- Citizenship: British after 1914
- Education: Royal Academy of Music
- Occupations: Composer, playwright
- Spouse: Georgianna Bessie Calder (m. 1878–1919)
- Children: Elsa ("Toby") and Dorothy ("Tommy")
- Writing career
- Period: Victorian, Edwardian
- Genre: Drama
- Notable work: Disraeli

Louis Napoleon Parker (21 October 1852 – 21 September 1944) was an English dramatist, composer and translator. Parker wrote many plays, developing a reputation for historical works. His 1911 play Disraeli is one of his best known, written as a vehicle for the actor George Arliss who later won an Academy Award for his performance in the 1929 film adaptation, itself based on his earlier 1921 silent film version.

In the 1900s, he staged a series of historical pageants: Sherborne Pageant (1905), the Warwick Pageant (1906) and the Bury Pageant (1907), huge productions involving 800–900 participants. Their success inspired a wave of "pageantitis" in England, including several more by Parker.

== Biography ==
He was born in Calvados, France, the son of the American Charles Albert Parker, who was a grandson of American congressman and judge Isaac Parker, and the Englishwoman Elizabeth Moray. The father was absent at his birth, and the attending French neighbours were so convinced the newborn would not survive that they christened the child immediately.

Parker grew up in several continental European countries. As an adult, he was fluent in Italian, French, and German. He was educated at Freiburg and studied composition with William Sterndale Bennett at the Royal Academy of Music. In 1878, he married Georgianna Bessie Calder, with whom he had two daughters, Elsa and Dorothy. Parker was organist and choirmaster at Sherborne School, Dorset from 1873 to 1892, which included a tenure as the second director of music in 1877, having succeeded his mentor's son James Robert Sterndale Bennett. His songs, cantatas, and instrumental music were composed during this time. He was an early English supporter of Richard Wagner, eventually serving as president of the Wagner Society of London.

Because of increasing deafness, Parker turned to drama. His first play would be the vehicle for Mrs. Patrick Campbell's London stage debut in 1890. His involvement in drama prompted him to move to London in 1896. In 1898, he was made a fellow of the Royal Academy of Music. One of his daughters, Dorothy, became an actress, including a performance in New York in Parker's Pomander Walk.

Parker wrote an autobiography Several of my Lives (Chapman & Hall 1928). He became a British subject in 1914. Georgianna died in 1919. Parker died in 1944.

== Work ==
Parker was the author of many cantatas, such as Silvia and the Twenty-third Psalm, as well as many other musical compositions.

Overall he wrote, alone or in collaboration or in translation, over 100 plays, including Change Alley, The Man in the Street, The Paper Chase, Pomander Walk, Rosemary, and adaptations including David Copperfield and The Monkey's Paw. His translations include Magda (Hermann Sudermann's play Heimat), The Duel by Henri Lavedan, L'Aiglon, and Cyrano de Bergerac. His plays were popular in London and New York. At times, three of his plays would be staged simultaneously in New York.

Whilst Director of Music at Sherborne School, he wrote over 16 school songs, including the Carmen Saeculare also known as Carmen Shirburniense, or simply the Carmen. The words were written by the headmaster at the time, Edward Mallet Young.

== Selected plays ==
- Pete (with Hall Caine, 1895)
- Rosemary, That's for Remembrance with Murray Carson (1896)
- The Cardinal (1901)
- The Monkey's Paw (1907) starring John Lawson
- Pomander Walk (1910)
- Disraeli (1911)
- Drake of England (1912)
- Joseph and His Brethren: A Pageant Play (1913) Written in 1906, but not produced until January 1913.
- Mavourneen (1915)
- Summertime (1919)
- Our Nell (1924)
