= The Christian (1898 play) =

1898 play by Hall Caine

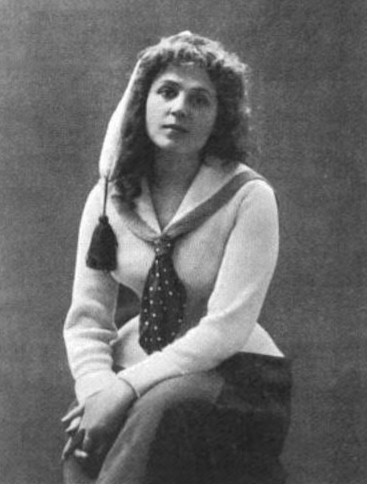
- Viola Allen as Glory Quayle in the prologue of The Christian
- Original language: English
- Written by: Hall Caine
- Based on: The Christian (1896) by Hall Caine
- Music by: William Furst
- Subject: Romance
- Genre: Drama
- Setting: Peel Castle; Colosseum Music Hall, St Mary Magdalene Church in Soho; Clement's Inn

Premiere
- Date: October 8, 1898
- Place: Knickerbocker Theatre
- Directed by: Walter Clark Bellows

The Christian is an 1898 play written by British author Hall Caine. It is a drama, with a prologue and four acts. Caine insisted the play was not an adaptation of his 1896 novel of the same name, but rather a new story using the same principal characters. It was more a romance than the theological drama of the novel, as an Anglican vicar of a slum parish in 1890s London tries to persuade a music hall performer to give up her career.

It was first produced by Liebler & Company, with staging by Walter Clark Bellows, sets by Louis Young, music by William Furst, and starring Viola Allen. It ran on Broadway from October 1898 through March 1899, averaging over $15,000 per week (Note: Equivalent to well over $500,000 in 2023.) at the box office. Liebler & Company sent out two touring companies to play venues around the United States. The tours were very successful, netting Liebler & Company a half-million dollars over the next few years, enabling it to produce plays with less commercial appeal, such as Children of the Ghetto.

== Characters ==
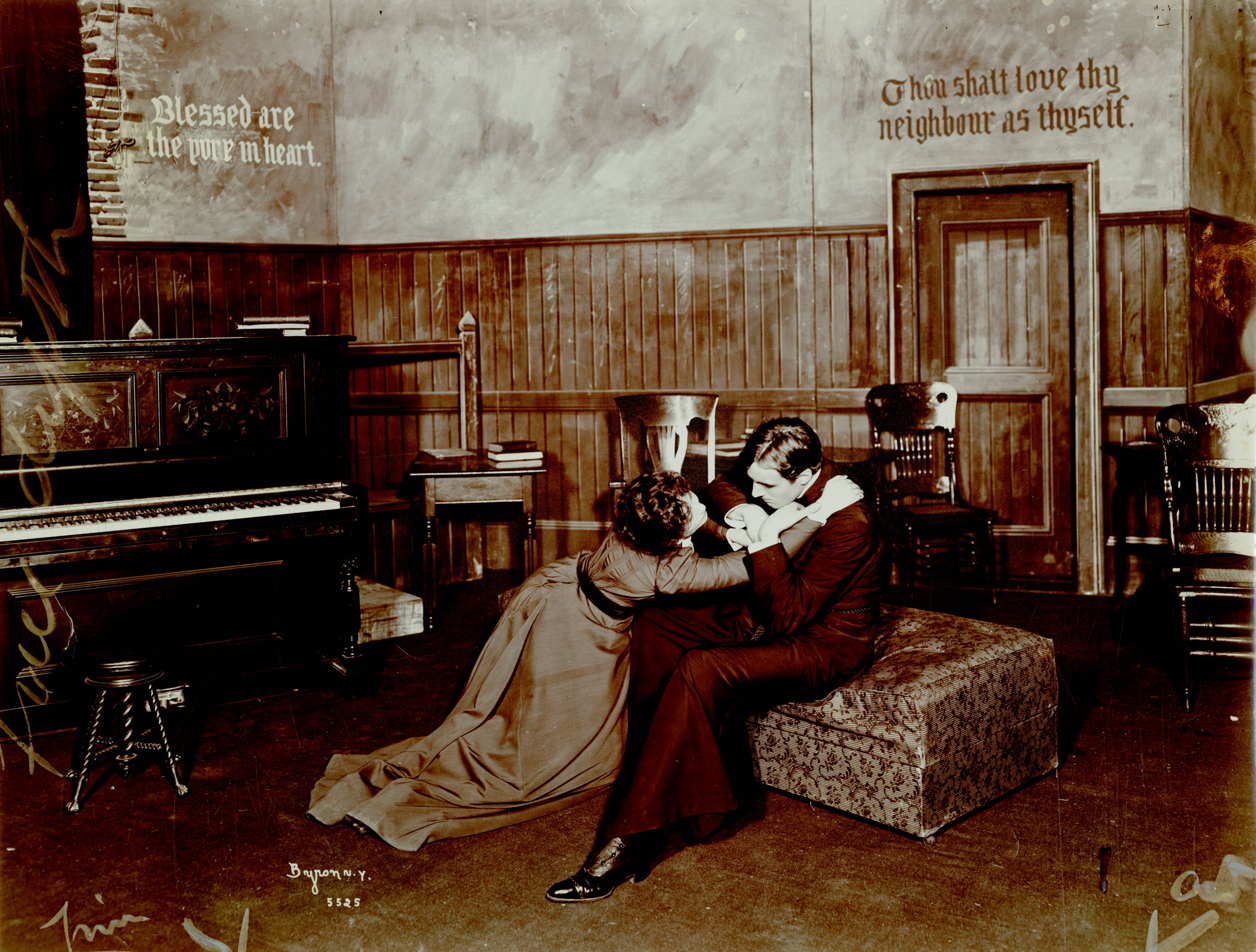
A scene from the Broadway production of The Christian

Lead

- Glory Quayle raised on the Isle of Man by her grandfather, is a successful music hall singer.
- John Storm son of Lord Storm, is a pious and inflexible Anglican priest, in love with Glory Quayle.

Supporting

- Lord Storm is John's widower father, who decries his son's turning away from the world of politics.
- Horatio Drake is a gentleman who produces Glory Quayle's career and wishes to marry her.
- Lord Robert Ure is the younger brother of a duke; he is morally bankrupt and a corrupting influence.
- Archdeacon Wealthy is a hypocritical cleric whose career is more financial than spiritual.
- Mrs. Callender is a Scottish philanthropist and social reformer, who works with John Storm.
- Polly Love is a nurse and Glory's friend, who has been seduced by Lord Robert.

Featured

- Parson Quayle is Glory's grandfather, a country parson on the Isle of Man.
- Father Lamplough is a crusading priest, retired from preaching, an inspiration to John Storm.
- The Faro King is a gambler and property owner in league with Lord Robert and the Manager.
- The Manager is a partner with Lord Robert in running the Colosseum Music Hall.
- Brother Paul is a young acolyte of Father John Storm, and older brother to Polly Love.
- Betty is a music hall performer, and "good friend" of the Manager and Lord Robert.
- Nettie is another music hall performer who goes with gentlemen.
- Letty is Betty's sister, and of the same professions.
- Liza is Glory's servant, whom Father John has helped in the past.

Off-stage

- Prime Minister is Lord Storm's elder brother and uncle to John Storm.

== Synopsis ==
Hall Caine rewrote The Christian in 1907, the only version readily available today. This synopsis of the 1898 version is based on contemporaneous newspaper reviews.

Prologue (At the ruins of Peel Castle on the Isle of Man.) (Note: The play's action indicates Lord Storm has taken up residence in one of the buildings within the ruined castle's grounds.) Lord Storm has heard from his elder brother that he will welcome his nephew John at Downing Street. Archdeacon Wealthy, Parson Quayle, Father Lamplough, and Mrs. Callender all drop by, each giving a picture of their philosophy and character thru conversation. John is particularly impressed by Father Lamplough's religious fervor. Horatio Drake, Lord Robert, and Glory Quayle join the group; they are abuzz with ideas for Glory to go on the stage. At the end, John refuses his uncle's offer, in order to enter a monastery. Lord Storm then disowns his son.

Act I (The green room of the Colosseum Music Hall in Soho, two years later.) Glory Quayle has gone to London and becomes a sensation as a Music Hall singer. Horatio Drake is promoting her career in hopes of marrying her. He gives a dinner in her honor, at which are Lord Robert, the Manager, the Faro King, and "three graces": Betty, Nettie, and Letty. Meanwhile, John Storm, who has become an Anglican priest, visits the music hall, hoping to see Glory. Her dresser, Liza, whom Father John has previously helped, takes him to see her. They meet just outside the green room, wherein the others are carousing. He warns Glory that this life will turn sour on her within a few years. She is glad to see him, but isn't ready to give up her career.

Act II (The clubroom of St. Mary Magdalene Church, the next day) Father John is serving a poor parish in the slums of Soho, undertaking to fulfill both spiritual and temporal needs. Brother Paul tells Father John about his sister Polly, that Lord Robert has seduced her. Father John arranges for Polly to take rooms in the same building as Glory for their mutual protection. Lord Robert and Horatio Drake hope to buy the church in order to expand their music hall, which stands next door. Father John is unwilling to sell for such a purpose. Archdeacon Wealthy, whose district the parish falls within, chides Father John; he expects some of the purchase money might come his way. Lord Robert, Horatio Drake, the Faro King, and the Manager try to intimidate Father John, but are set upon by a mob of his devoted parishioners.

Act III (Glory's rooms at Clement's Inn) Lord Robert has stirred up public opinion against Father John by claiming he has prophesied Derby Day as Judgement Day. While trying to escape rioting slum dwellers, Father John takes refuge with Glory at her lodging. They argue, until at last, overcome with thwarted love and religious passion, he threatens to kill her, to save her from being degraded. Glory convinces him there is no danger to her soul and that she loves him. Polly enters saying Lord Robert and Horatio Drake are coming. Glory has Polly smuggle Father John to her own room in the lodging, from which Polly and he escape the building.

Act IV (Same as Act II) A mob stirred up by Lord Robert has chased Father John to the church, but are pacified when Glory refutes the charges against him. Horatio Drake abandons his effort to buy the church, and yields up his contract claim on Glory. Glory joins Father John Storm in his work among the poor at the parish church, with a promise of their own joining in marriage to come.

== Differences with novel ==
Hall Caine regarded the play not so much as a dramatization of the novel as a completely new story, reusing characters and events. The novel had only Lord Storm, Parson Quayle, John Storm, and Glory Quayle on the Isle of Man. Glory, a charmingly fey orphan, was leaving to become a nurse in London, while John was already in Holy Orders. Glory's career as a nurse was dropped from the drama; she went directly into being a music hall star with the Act I opening. The Prime Minister played a small but significant part in the novel; he was reduced to a few mentions in the play. Polly Love was made the sister of Brother Paul in the play. Father John in the novel was a fire and brimstone preacher who thundered about the coming Judgement Day; in the drama, he is more soft-spoken and humanitarian. In the novel, the climax is Father John Storm being set upon by ruffians and mortally beaten, marrying Glory Quayle on his deathbed.

== Original production ==
=== Background ===
Hall Caine wrote the first stage version of The Christian in early 1897. To establish the English copyright, it was given a perfunctory performance on August 7, 1897, at the Grand Theatre on the Isle of Man. Admission was one pound, a colossal sum at the time, to discourage attendance. (Note: By law, handbills advertising the event had to be printed giving the correct date, time, and venue, and the performance had to be public.) Caine himself played John Storm, while his wife Mary took the part of Polly Love. Their son Ralph Caine was Brother Andrew, (Note: This character was later renamed to Brother Paul.) while Hall Caine's sister, Lily Hall Caine, played Glory Quayle.

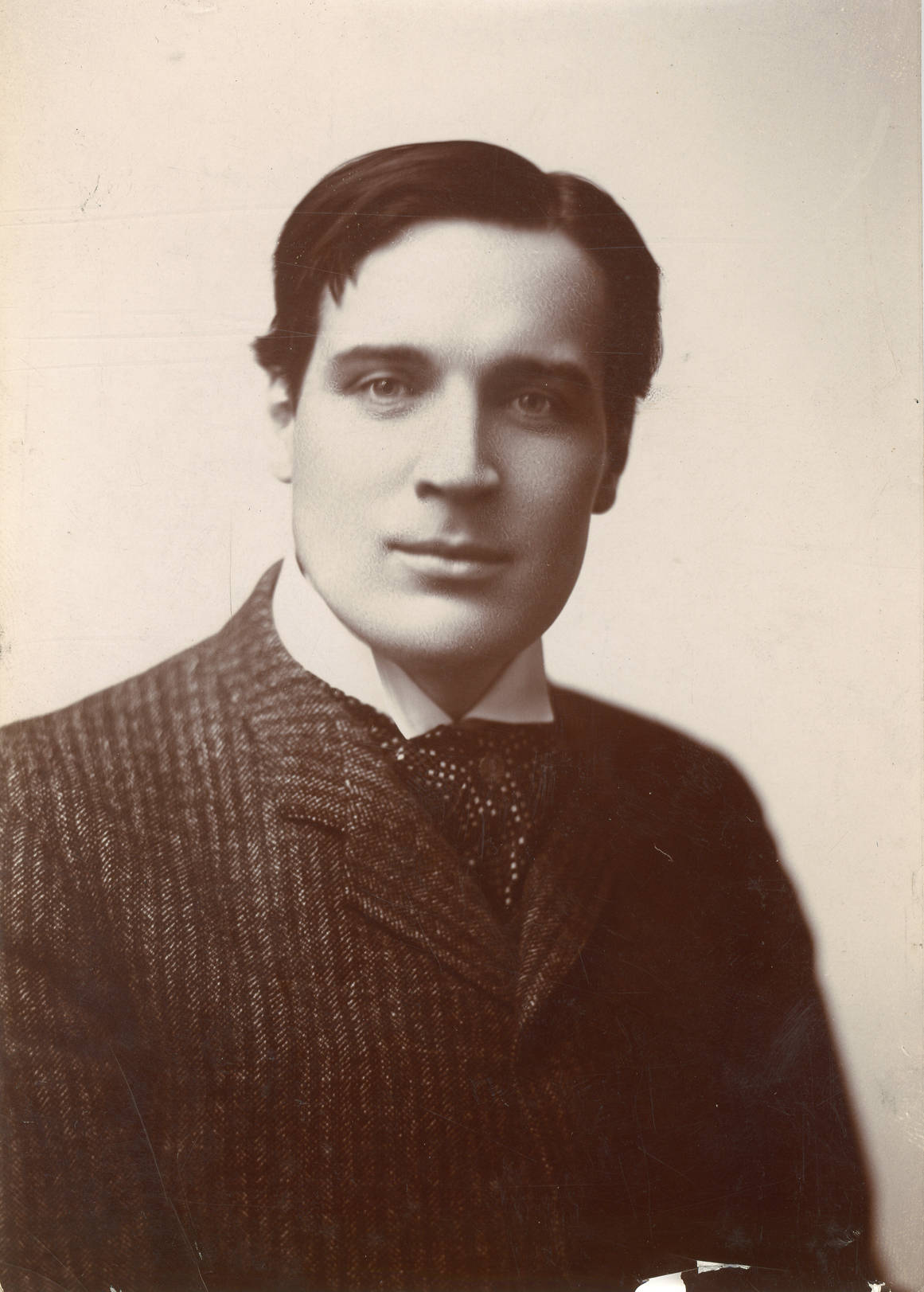
Edward J. Morgan

Liebler & Company was a partnership between investor Theodore A. Liebler and producer-manager George C. Tyler. It was a new company, with just one prior production to its credit, though Tyler had eight years previous experience managing troupes and producing plays. Tyler persuaded Viola Allen to sign a personal management contract with his company. She was a well-known player in America, but had yet to star in a Broadway production. It was Allen who suggested Hall Caine's dramatization of The Christian to Tyler. After reading the play, Tyler and Allen agreed she would go to the Isle of Man and persuade Caine to make some changes. Caine and Allen came to agreement over revisions to the play, and Allen invited the author to be her guest in America for the show's opening.

Rehearsals began August 22, 1898 under the direction of Walter Clark Bellows. The Lyceum Theatre stock company under Charles Frohman lent Edward J. Morgan to The Christian to play the male lead opposite Viola Allen, with the condition he would be returned in mid-November 1898. Sets were designed by Louis Young from photos and drawings brought back from Britain by Viola Allen, while William Furst composed incidental music based on Manx folk melodies she also collected.

To reassure Allen and Caine about the production's viability, Tyler asked Abe Erlanger to view one of the rehearsals. Erlanger was impressed enough that Klaw and Erlanger bought a one-third interest in the production. As independent producers, Liebler & Company were not part of the Theatrical Syndicate, so this outside investment was a form of insurance for them, guaranteeing their future bookings.

=== Cast ===
Principal cast for the tryouts in Albany and Washington, D. C., and during the original Broadway run.
Role	Actor	Dates	Notes and sources
Glory Quayle	Viola Allen	Sep 23, 1898 - Mar 04, 1899	
John Storm	Edward J. Morgan	Sep 23, 1898 - Nov 16, 1898	Morgan, loaned from the Lyceum Theatre company, had to return to it for Trelawny of the "Wells".
John Storm	Joseph Haworth	Nov 17, 1898 - Feb 21, 1899	Haworth was hired when Morgan left, but was fired during the last weeks of the Broadway run.
John Storm	Henry M. Jewett	Feb 22, 1899 - Mar 04, 1899	
Lord Storm	C. G. Craig	Sep 23, 1898 - Mar 04, 1899	
Horatio Drake	John Mason	Sep 23, 1898 - Mar 04, 1899	
Lord Robert Ure	Jameson Lee Finney	Sep 23, 1898 - Mar 04, 1899	
Archdeacon Wealthy	George Woodward	Sep 23, 1898 - Mar 04, 1899	
Mrs. Callender	Georgia Dickson	Sep 23, 1898 - Mar 04, 1899	Many reviewers noted the Scottish accent of Dickson's character seemed to come and go.
Polly Love	Ethel Marlowe	Sep 23, 1898 - Nov 16, 1898	Marlowe collapsed and died backstage after finishing her night's performance.
Polly Love	Catherine Reeves	Nov 17, 1898 - Nov 19, 1898	Reeves was Marlowe's understudy, but was only temporarily used for the role of Polly.
Polly Love	Grace Filkins	Nov 21, 1898 - Mar 04, 1899	
Parson Quayle	Guy Nichols	Sep 23, 1898 - Mar 04, 1899	
Father Lamplough	R. J. Dillon	Sep 23, 1898 - Mar 04, 1899	
The Faro King	Myron Calice	Sep 23, 1898 - Mar 04, 1899	
The Manager	Edgar Norton	Sep 23, 1898 - Mar 04, 1899	
Brother Paul	Frank J. Keenan	Sep 23, 1898 - Mar 04, 1899	Keenan was also the stage manager, and directed the mob scenes.
Betty	Carrie Merrilees	Sep 23, 1898 - Mar 04, 1899	
Nettie	Edith Merrilees	Sep 23, 1898 - Oct 07, 1898	Edith Merrilees and Perdita Hudspeth exchanged roles just before the Broadway premiere.
Nettie	Perdita Hudspeth	Oct 10, 1898 - Mar 04, 1899	
Letty	Bessie Dunn	Sep 23, 1898 - Mar 04, 1899	
Liza	Perdita Hudspeth	Sep 23, 1898 - Oct 07, 1898	
Liza	Edith Merrilees	Oct 10, 1898 - Mar 04, 1899	

=== Tryout ===
The play's first tryout took place at the New Empire Theatre in Albany, New York on September 23, 1898. The theatre was crowded; the author, occupying a box, was cheered by the audience after each act, with the final curtain not falling until after midnight.

Following the Albany debut, the production moved to the National Theatre in Washington, D.C., on September 26, 1898. The audience was "packed to the doors", and required fourteen curtain calls during the evening's performance. Hall Caine was forced to give a speech at the end of the third act climax, thanking the crowd for its enthusiasm. One reviewer, while praising the writing and performances, thought the staging could be improved, while also noting the short fourth act was "almost superfluous". Another was disconcerted at the drastic changes from the original novel, particularly John Storm's makeover from a religious fanatic to a soft-spoken everyday priest.

=== Premiere and reception ===
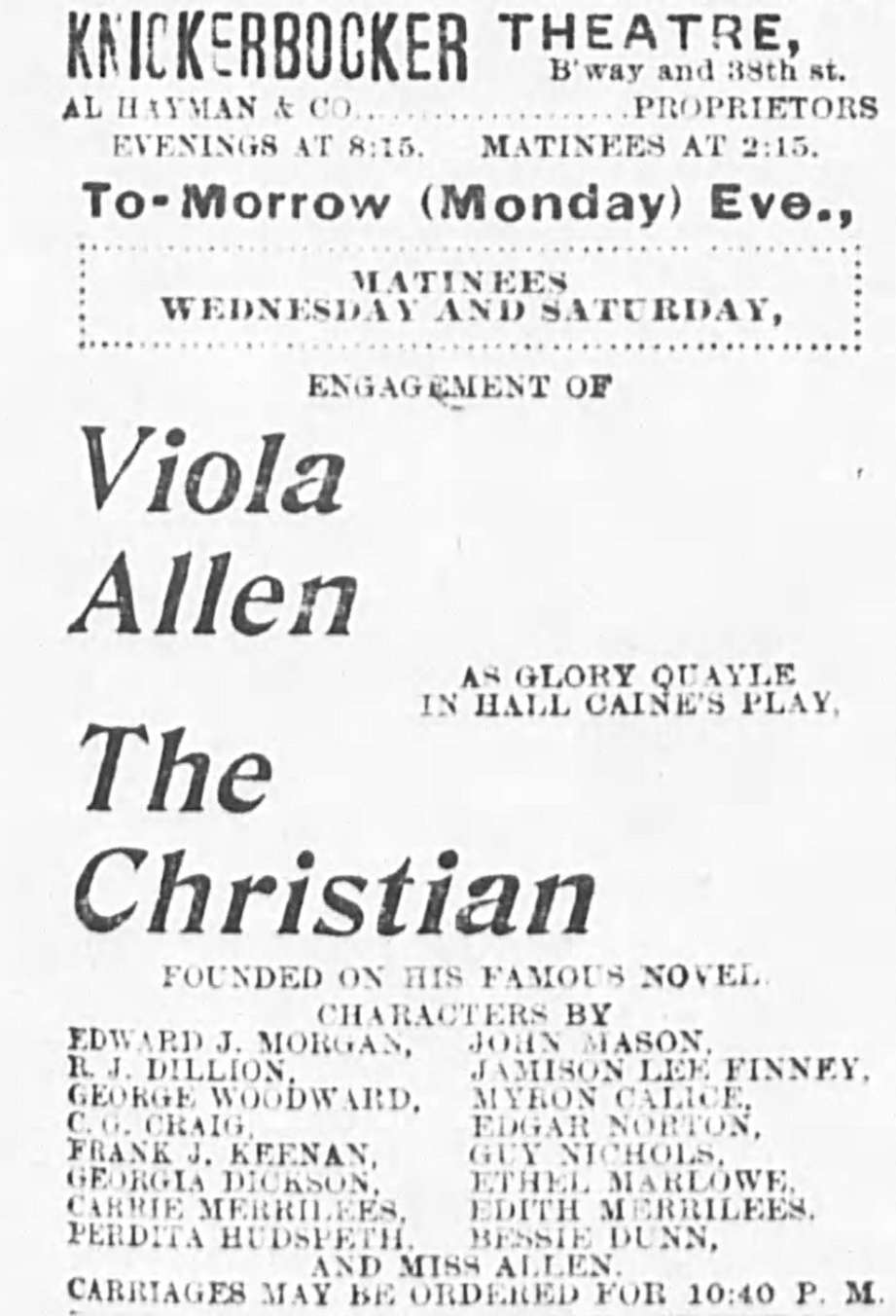

The Christian premiered at the Knickerbocker Theatre on October 10, 1898. Viola Allen had top billing, with the author's name in much smaller letters, and unusually, all sixteen principals listed below the title. The reviewer for The New York Times noted the theatre on opening night was crowded to the doors with no room for late-comers, which they attributed to Viola Allen rather than Hall Caine's talent as a dramatist. They considered the play to be of doubtful artistic importance but thought it "not bad" as a popular "stage piece".

A review filed from New York with the Chicago Tribune spoke of the many differences between novel and play, and how the former made explicit the complicated relationship between Glory Quayle and John Storm, where the play left gaps and had abrupt transitions. The local newspaper in Producer Tyler's hometown of Chillicothe, Ohio reprinted two New York reviews. The first by Alan Dale in the New York Journal said "the first three acts of the play are dismal swamps of talk". Dale felt Glory's transition from simple country girl in the prologue to dazzling music hall success with the first-act opening demanded more in the way of explanation. He did give popular opinion its due: "But the applause at the Knickerbocker was tremendous". The reviewer for The Sun was more concerned with the story than its structure, but raised an interesting point by saying there were two sincere suitors for the hand of Glory Quayle and the more worldly one might have made the better husband.

=== Death of actress ===
Ethel Marlowe, who played Polly Love, died at age 27 in a wing of the Knickerbocker Theatre on November 16, 1898. She had just finished her last scene, during the close of the third act, and had exited the stage. As it was a Wednesday, she had already completed a matinee performance earlier in the day. While sitting on a stool, waiting for Viola Allen to also exit, she slumped to the floor. Frank Keenan, the stage manager who also played Brother Paul, kept the curtain closed after the third act while asking for any doctors in the house to come backstage. The doctors who responded pronounced her dead. The fourth act curtain opened after a thirty-minute delay without the audience being aware of the death. Marlowe had told other cast members she suffered from heart disease. She came from a theatrical family; her mother was then performing in Washington D.C., while her father and older sister had also died in theaters from heart trouble. She was a cousin of the actress Julia Marlowe.

=== Changes of Venue ===
Due to a prior booking at the Knickerbocker Theatre, The Christian finished there on November 19, 1898, after a six-week run, during which the production made $70,000. It played for one week at the Columbia Theatre in Brooklyn, from November 21, 1898. It then resumed its Broadway run at the Garden Theatre on November 28, 1898.

Producer Tyler fired male lead Joseph Haworth towards the end of the Broadway run for "a breach of the regulations prevailing in all well ordered companies", while Haworth claimed he quit because his lines as Father John were being cut to give more emphasis to Viola Allen's character. He was replaced with Henry M. Jewett.

=== Closing ===
The Christian finished its Broadway run at the Garden Theatre on March 4, 1899. The production then moved to the Boston Museum stage on March 6, 1899. During its first two weeks in Boston the production set a box office record by averaging over $13,000 per week.

== Adaptations ==
=== Stage ===
The play was rewritten by its author in 1907, a version that played in the UK, and was further revised in Australia during 1911 by English actor Roy Redgrave.

=== Film ===
The Australian stage version was filmed as The Christian shortly after its first performances in September 1911.

Hall Caine wrote a film scenario adapted from the 1907 UK stage version that was the basis for a 1914 American film.

Two later films, a 1915 British film and a 1923 American film, both used the 1896 novel as the starting point for their screenplays.

== Bibliography ==
- George C. Tyler and J. C. Furnas. Whatever Goes Up. Bobbs Merrill, 1934.
