= Joseph and His Brethren (play) =

1906 play by Louis N. Parker

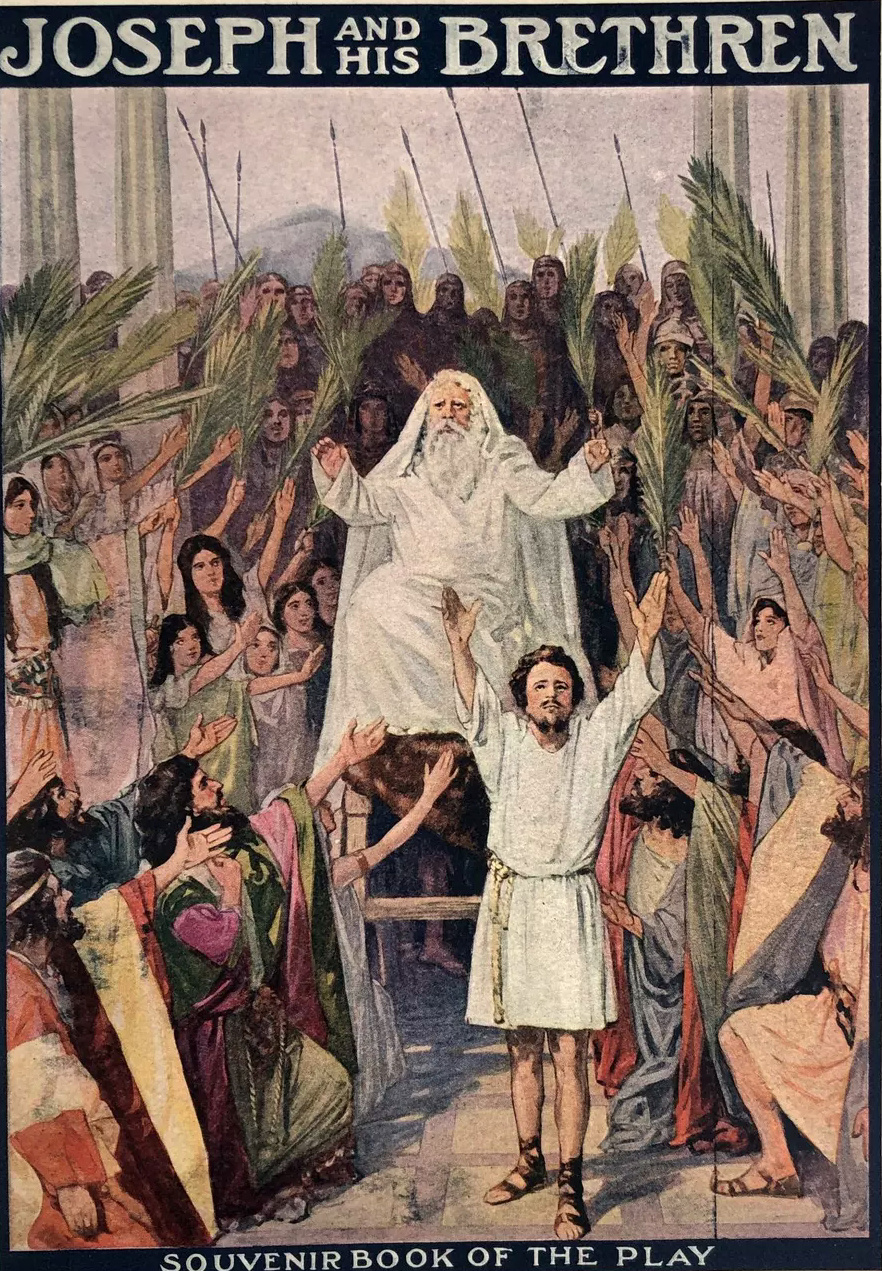
- Original language: English
- Written by: Louis N. Parker
- Music by: Arthur Farwell
- Subject: Biblical story of Joseph
- Genre: Spectacle

Premiere
- Date: January 11, 1913
- Place: Century Theatre, New York City
- Directed by: Louis N. Parker and Frederick Stanhope

Joseph and His Brethren is a 1906 play by British writer Louis N. Parker that was not produced until 1913. This biblical pageant has four acts, each with its own subtitle, comprising thirteen scenes and eleven settings, with a very large cast. The story is taken from the Book of Genesis.

The play was first produced by Liebler & Company and staged by the author and Frederick Stanhope, with sets by Gates & Morange and incidental music by Arthur Farwell. It starred Brandon Tynan, with Pauline Frederick, Howard Kyle, and James O'Neill. It had its Broadway première in January 1913, running through April 1913 for 124 performances.

== Characters ==
Characters are divided into Caananites and Egyptians as per Parker's published play. For clarity, many featured and all bit players are omitted.

=== Caananites ===
Lead

- Joseph is the son of Jacob and Rachel and is a prophet of God.
- Simeon is a son of Jacob and Leah and is the wickedest and wiliest of Joseph's half-brothers.

Supporting

- Reuben is the eldest son of Jacob and Leah (Note: Leah is not in the play.) and is the only half-brother who is good to Joseph.
- Judah is the fourth son of Jacob and Leah.
- Jacob is Joseph's father and the father of his ten older half-brothers and younger brother, Benjamin.
- Levi is the third son of Jacob and Leah.
- Issachar is the fifth son of Jacob and Leah.
- Gad is a son of Jacob and Zilpah.
- Dan is a son of Jacob and Bilhah.

Featured

- Zebulun is the sixth son of Jacob and Leah.
- Asher is a son of Jacob and Zilpah.
- Naphtali is a son of Jacob and Bilhah.
- Rachel is a wife of Jacob, the younger sister of Leah, and the mother of Joseph and Benjamin.
- Zilpah is a handmaid to Leah, who gave her as a surrogate wife to Jacob.
- Bilhah is a handmaid to Rachel, who gave her as a surrogate wife to Jacob.
- Benjamin is the younger son of Jacob and Rachel and is Joseph's only full brother. (Note: The playwright mistakenly has Benjamin as a young lad in Act I Scene 1 on page 11 of the published play. Benjamin in Act IV is said to have been born after Joseph was sold into bondage.)

=== Egyptians ===
Lead

- Zuleika is an Assyrian from Ninevah (Note: An invention of the playwright. Zuleika, in Act II Scene 3, reminds Joseph they are both slaves in strange lands, sold into bondage by their kinsmen.) who is first betrothed to and then the wife of Potiphar.

Supporting

- Potiphar is commander of Pharaoh's army and Zuleika's husband.
- Pharaoh Usertesen I is a leader who is troubled by dreams.
- Enenkhet is captain of the prison and then Joseph's steward.
- Asenath is daughter to Menthu and beloved of Joseph.

Featured

- Dedefre is a noble.
- Ranofer is the lord treasurer.
- Menthu is the high priest of the goddess Neith.
- Ansu is the chief magician.
- Imhotep is Pharaoh's chief butler.
- Serseru is Pharaoh's chief baker.
- Iri is the chief soothsayer.
- Wakara is Zuleika's tiring-woman.
- Tamai is Zuleika's chief maid-in-waiting.
- Khenen is a noble lady.
- Shepset is a noble lady.

== Synopsis ==
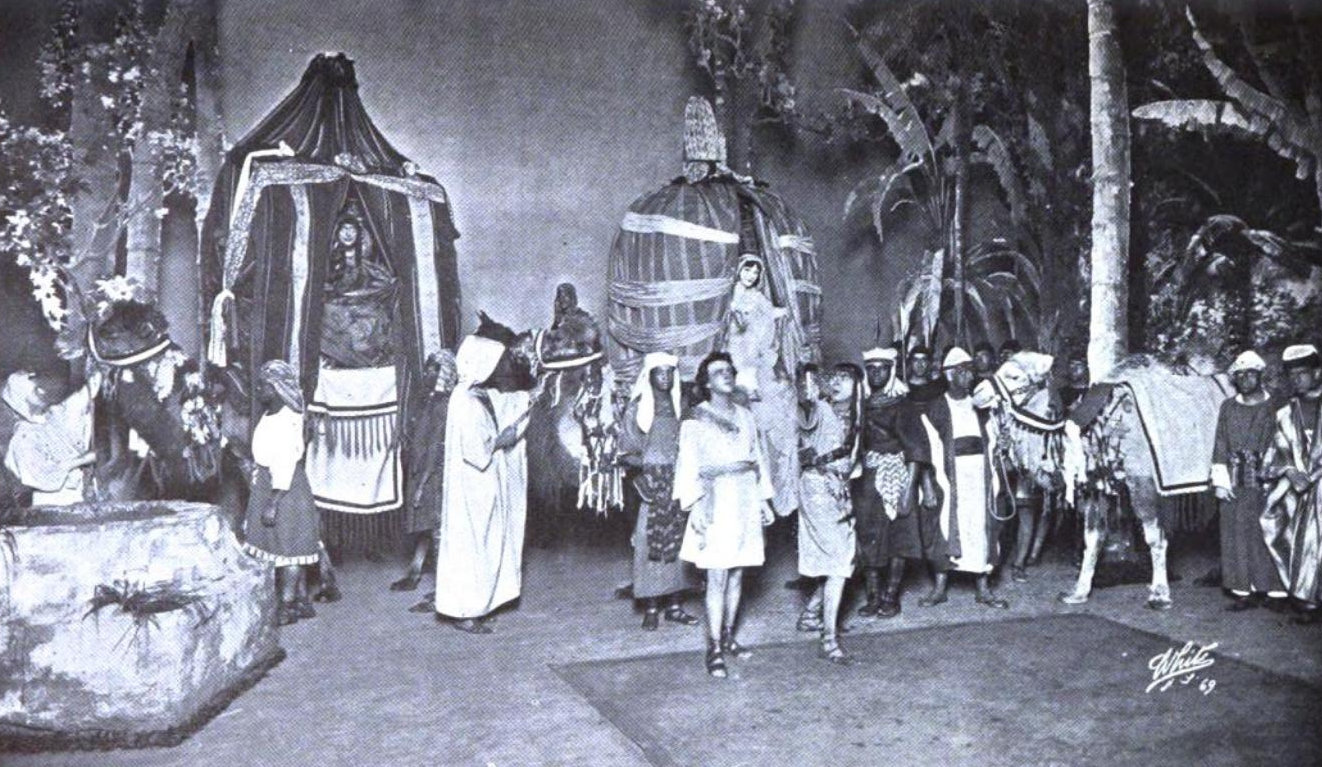

Act I: The Coat of Many Colors

(Scene 1: The tents of Shechem, morning)

The brothers hear of travelers from Nineveh, on their way to Egypt, bearing a wife for Potiphar. They nearly come to blows until Reuben quiets them. He reminds them it is a day of rejoicing, for Joseph has come of age. Jacob explains why Joseph is precious to him and bestows the coat of many colors on him. As they depart to meet the strangers, Jacob tells Joseph to go with them, but Rachel begs him to stay close to Reuben.

(Curtain)

(Scene 2: The Wells of Dothan, afternoon)

Joseph reaches the wells after Reuben has been decoyed away by Simeon. Joseph is pushed into a dry well by his brothers. When the caravan arrives, Joseph is found to be alive. Zuleika at first orders him slain for mocking her gods but spares him to be a slave. Simeon sprinkles lamb's blood on Joseph's coat to fool Reuben into thinking a lion killed him.

(Curtain)

(Scene 3: Jacob's tent, evening)

Rachel, Zilpah, and Bilhah prepare the feast to honor Joseph. The sons of Jacob enter, bearing gifts for Joseph, whom they say they have not seen. Last comes Simeon, who suggests Joseph might be with Reuben. Men sing and women dance as they await Joseph. Suddenly Reuben enter the tent, a storm starting behind him in the open doorway, as he holds up Joseph's bloody coat.

(Curtain)

Act II: The Temptation

(Scene 1: The Central Hall in Potiphar's House, sunset)

Joseph has been shown favor by Potiphar, who has at last wedded Zuleika. Asenath and other maidens enter the hall, to prepare for the wedding night. All admire Joseph, who has eyes only for Asenath. Potiphar arrives and promises Joseph his freedom. Zuleika is displeased, but Imhotep interrupts; Pharaoh demands Potiphar lead his armies out that night. Frustrated of his wedding night, Potiphar obeys, leaving Joseph in charge of his household.

(Curtain)

(Scene 2: Potiphar's garden, seen by moonlight, three months later)

News arrives of Potiphar's victory and imminent return. Joseph and Asenath meet and declare their love. They hide when Ranofer and Serseru enter, plotting to poison both Pharaoh and Imhotep. After they leave, Wakara enters seeking Joseph; she glimpses Asenath slipping away. Wakara says her mistress demands Joseph visit her. Joseph demures, reminding Wakara he is Potiphar's slave, not Zuleika's.

(Curtain)

(Scene 3: Zuleika's room, an hour before dawn)

Alone, Zuleika prays to Astarte for Joseph to be blinded by love. Wakara brings word of his refusal to come, and mentions a woman was in the garden. Zuleika summons and questions Tamai and other handmaidens. Using the plot against Pharaoh as an excuse, Wakara persuades Joseph to come. But Zuleika cannot seduce him; Joseph sees in her sinuous form and shining eyes the serpents in the dry well of Dothan. He flees her, and she curses him.

(Curtain)

(Scene 4: Same as Act II, Scene 1, dawn)

Potiphar returns in triumph and awards Joseph his freedom but a few moments later has him stripped and scourged when Zuleika falsely accuses him.

(Curtain)

Act III: The Dreams

(Scene 1: The yard of the prison, toward sunset)

Imhotep, Serseru, and Joseph are imprisoned in cells carved into a cliff. Enenkhet lets them enjoy the cool air of evening. Joseph interprets dreams for Imhotep and Serseru, who are then summoned by Pharaoh. Enenkhet asks Joseph to consider him a friend. Zuleika deceives them both by using Asenath's voice. Seeing Joseph outside his cell, she orders him thrown into a pit.

(Curtain)

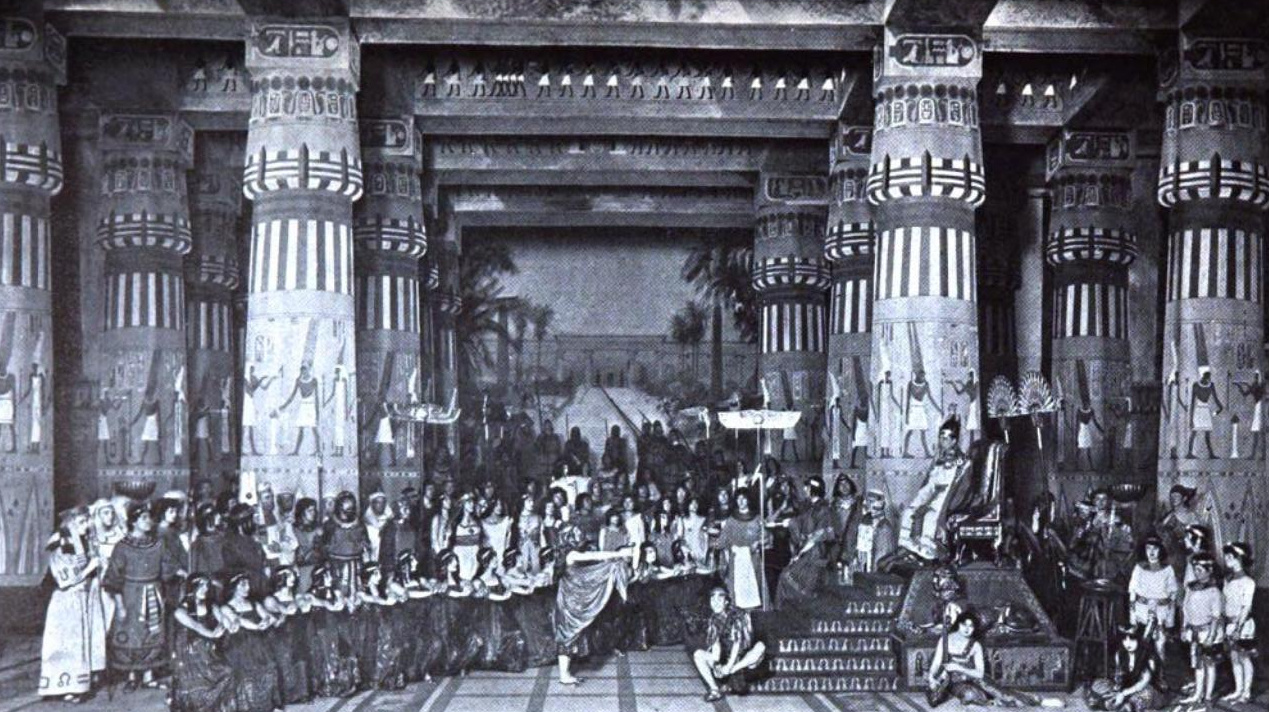

(Scene 2: The great hall in Pharaoh's palace, two years later)

Shepset and Khenen discuss Asenath's impending dedication to Neith for life. Crowds of nobles and ladies watch as Menthu, Ansu, and Iri fail to interpret Pharaoh's dreams. Imhotep, restored to favor, alerts Pharaoh to one who can interpret them. Enenkhet brings an emaciated and ragged Joseph to Pharaoh, who interprets the dreams. Pharaoh directs him to guide Egypt through the years of plenty and famine.

(Curtain)

Act IV: The Deliverer

(Scene 1: Same as Act I, Scene 3, many years later)

Famine is everywhere; only Egypt has grain, thanks to Joseph's guidance. In Caanan, the brothers plead with Jacob to let Benjamin go with them to Egypt to buy grain, to which he agrees.

(Curtain)

(Scene 2: An open space outside Joseph's house)

Joseph and Asenath are now married with two young sons. Simeon is held captive as surety for his brothers' return with Benjamin. He does not recognize Joseph but does know Zuleika. She urges Simeon to join her at Cheop's Pyramid at midnight.

(Curtain)

(Scene 3: At the foot of an angle of the pyramid, midnight)

Potiphar, informed by Tamai, has reached the pyramid first with his men. They hear Zuleika deceive Simeon into thinking his brother is held captive. After giving him a poisoned dagger, she sends him off. But Potiphar confronts her; when she scorns him, his men drag her away and blind her with red-hot irons.

(Curtain)

(Scene 4: The hall in Joseph's house)

The brethren have brought Benjamin, and in return Simeon is brought forth. Joseph reveals himself to them, all is forgiven, and Jacob is brought forth in a sedan chair to proclaim God's mercy.

(Final curtain)

== Original production ==
=== Background ===
Louis N. Parker first wrote this play in the winter of 1905–1906. He saw no opportunity for its production until after Liebler & Company produced his plays Pomander Walk (1910) and Disraeli (1911). Liebler & Company was a partnership between investor T. A. Liebler and producer-manager George C. Tyler. They had taken a managerial lease on the massive Century Theatre in 1911 for their spectacle The Garden of Allah, which proved a long-running success. Their second spectacle at the Century, The Daughter of Heaven (La fille du ciel) by Pierre Loti and Judith Gautier, however, was not well received. The Century, with its huge stage and numerous floors of dressing rooms served by elevators, was an expensive venue to keep running. Liebler & Company were glad to get Parker's play, as it made back the money lost on Daughter of Heaven.

The production was staged by Parker and Frederick Stanhope. The sets were designed and built by Gates & Morange. A reviewer mentioned these were mainly painted backdrops, with only the Pharaoh's Hall and the Pyramid scenes displaying notable sets. Arthur Farwell composed incidental music for the play, while the costumer was Alexander Ramsey.

=== Cast ===
Principal cast only for the original Broadway run.
Role	Actor	Dates	Notes and sources
Joseph	Brandon Tynan	Jan 11, 1913 - Apr 26, 1913	
Zuleika	Pauline Frederick	Jan 11, 1913 - Apr 26, 1913	
Simeon	Howard Kyle	Jan 11, 1913 - Apr 26, 1913	
Jacob / Pharaoh	James O'Neill	Jan 11, 1913 - Apr 26, 1913	O'Neill refused to sit around doing nothing for half the play and so was also given the role of Pharaoh.
Reuben	Harvey Braban	Jan 11, 1913 - Apr 26, 1913	
Enenkhet	Charles Herman	Jan 11, 1913 - Apr 26, 1913	
Asenath	Lily Cahill	Jan 11, 1913 - Feb 15, 1913	Cahill was transferred by Liebler & Co. to A Man's Friends.
Asenath	Dorothy Parker	Feb 17, 1913 - Apr 26, 1913	This was the playwright's daughter, not the American poet and author.
Serseru	Hoarce James	Jan 11, 1913 - Apr 26, 1913	
Rachel	Olive Oliver	Jan 11, 1913 - Apr 26, 1913	
Levi / Imhotep	Frank Woolfe	Jan 11, 1913 - Apr 26, 1913	
Judah	Emmett King	Jan 11, 1913 - Apr 26, 1913	
Issachar / Iri	F. Wilmot	Jan 11, 1913 - Apr 26, 1913	
Zebulun	Edwin Cushman	Jan 11, 1913 - Apr 26, 1913	
Gad	Leslie Palmer	Jan 11, 1913 - Apr 26, 1913	
Asher / Ranofer	Franklyn Pangborn	Jan 11, 1913 - Apr 26, 1913	
Dan / Menthu	Charles Macdonald	Jan 11, 1913 - Apr 26, 1913	
Naphtali / Ansu	James O'Neill Jr.	Jan 11, 1913 - Apr 26, 1913	This son of James O'Neill should not be confused with James O'Neill (actor, born 1863).
Wakara	Jane Ferrell	Jan 11, 1913 - Apr 26, 1913	
Tamai	Dorothy Parker	Jan 11, 1913 - Mar 08, 1913	Despite taking over the role of Asenath, Parker continued playing Tamai for three weeks.
Tamai	Jessie Abott	Mar 08, 1913 - Apr 26, 1913	She was the twin sister of Bessie Abott.
Zilpah / Khenen	Harriet Ross	Jan 11, 1913 - Apr 26, 1913	
Bilhah / Shepset	Madeline Traverse	Jan 11, 1913 - Apr 26, 1913	
Benjamin	Sydney D. Carlyle	Jan 11, 1913 - Apr 26, 1913	
(Specialty Dancer)	Violet Romer	Jan 11, 1913 - Apr 26, 1913	

=== Broadway premiere and reception ===
Joseph and His Brethren had its premiere at the Century Theatre in Manhattan on January 11, 1913. The first performance was a Saturday matinee. After its successful completion, producer George C. Tyler went backstage to distribute $500 in bonus money (Note: The average worker in 1913 earned about 20 cents per hour.) to the stage hands. After the first day matinee, Joseph's coat of many colors was stolen by a souvenir hunter. Artist Edward Morange painted a piece of white canvas in the appropriate colors, which costumer Alexander Ramsey fashioned into a coat in time for the evening performance.

Reviewers regarded it as a spectacle, a theatrical production of epic scale more about visual appeal than dramatic themes. The Brooklyn Times reviewer was typical in emphasizing the number of people on stage and the scenery. The critic for The Boston Evening Transcript approached the play as a Bible study lesson. The New York Times reviewer was pleasantly surprised to find the play was entertaining, which they attributed as much to the cast assembled by George C. Tyler, as to the writing of Louis Parker.

=== Closing ===
The production closed at the Century Theatre on April 26, 1913, after 124 performances. Liebler & Company had received an offer from the Angelini-Gattini Opera Company of Milan to take over the lease of the Century, which they were glad to accept, given the expense of running it.

== Bibliography ==
- George C. Tyler and J. C. Furnas. Whatever Goes Up. Bobbs Merrill, 1934.
- Louis N. Parker. Joseph and His Brethren: A Pageant Play. John Lane Company, 1913.
