= Liebler & Company =

Theatrical production and management 1898-1914

- Company type: Partnership
- Industry: Entertainment
- Predecessor: The Liebler Company (Incorporated 1897)
- Founded: November 18, 1898; 127 years ago
- Founder: T. A. Liebler and George C. Tyler
- Defunct: December 4, 1914
- Fate: Receivership
- Headquarters: New York City
- Area served: North America and England
- Key people: Hugh Ford
- Products: Theatrical productions and management
- Owner: T. A. Liebler and George C. Tyler
- Subsidiaries: The Liebler Company (Purchased after 1899)

Liebler & Company was a partnership that produced stage plays and managed theatrical stars and troupes from 1898 through 1914. During this time it produced 97 original plays on Broadway, and a score of revivals. Among its most successful productions was The Christian (1898), Sag Harbor (1900), Mrs. Wiggs of the Cabbage Patch (1903), Merely Mary Ann (1903), Raffles, the Amateur Cracksman (1903), The Squaw Man (1905), Salomy Jane (1907), The Man from Home (1908), Alias Jimmy Valentine, The Melting Pot (1909), Disraeli (1911), and Joseph and His Brethren (1913). It sponsored American tours by Mrs Patrick Campbell, George Arliss, Eleonora Duse, and the Abbey Players. Its production of Children of the Ghetto in 1899 sparked controversy, while the American debut of The Playboy of the Western World in 1911 provoked a riot in a Broadway theater. The advent of World War I in Europe and tightening fiscal conditions in America led to a cash-flow crisis in December 1914, causing the company to be placed into receivership.

== Founding ==
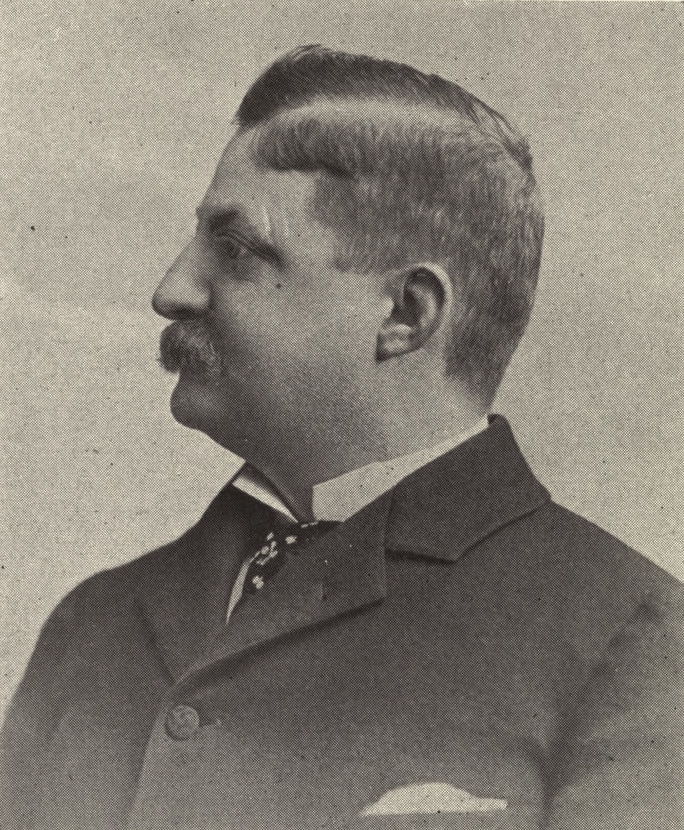
T. A. Liebler, Jr. (1909)

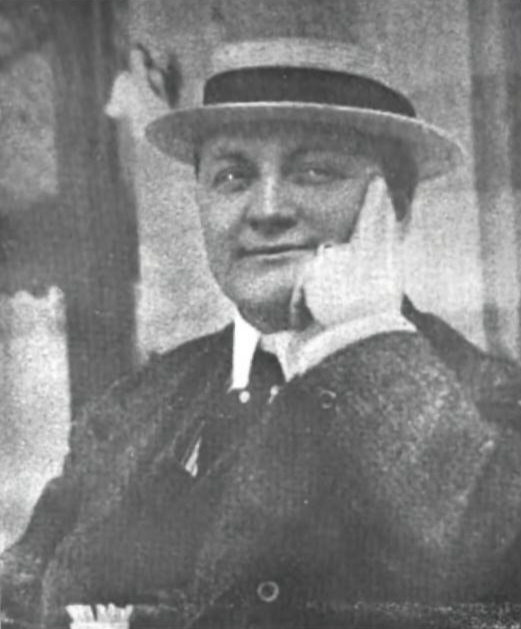
George C. Tyler 1907

Theodore August Liebler Jr (1852-1941) owned lithography firm Liebler & Maas, which had been co-founded by his father. On August 22, 1891, a noontime explosion and fire in the Taylor building at 70 Park Place in Manhattan, killed several employees and wrecked the firm's offices. The company struggled to recover over the next few years, but eventually the Park Place disaster forced it into bankruptcy during December 1896. Liebler then joined up with producer George C. Tyler and theatrical manager John A. Reed in October 1897 to form The Liebler Company, which was incorporated in New Jersey. Liebler supplied the financing for their first venture, sponsoring Charles Francis Coghlan in The Royal Box. Though a popular success, the tour was financially hampered due to Coghlan's outstanding debts. (Note: A published excerpt from Liebler's diary said upon first meeting Coghlan, the actor borrowed fifty dollars to get his coat out of hock, then offered to take Liebler and Tyler to dinner if they would lend him another ten dollars.)

Tyler and Liebler decided to back Viola Allen in a new play, The Christian by Hall Caine. Allen persuaded Hall Caine to come over from England to help with the premiere. The production also had financial help from Klaw and Erlanger, who took a half interest in it, but not Allen's contract. Reed thought it too risky, so Liebler and Tyler sold him their shares in The Liebler Company and formed a partnership called Liebler & Company. Liebler & Company then bought out Reed's interest in Allen's contract and The Christian. While Reid continued to manage Coghlan, Liebler & Company took over Viola Allen's contract and the production of The Christian.

The Christian proved an enormous success, ensuring the financial viability of Liebler & Co., while Reed's stewardship of Coghlan foundered on April 17, 1899, when the latter refused to go on stage unless he was paid. Tyler's memoir is explicit about Coghlan's profligacy, how the theater box office, if not attached by a deputy sheriff on behalf of Coghlan's creditors, would be raided by the actor himself for walking-around money. Eventually the partners were able to buy back The Liebler Company. The subsidiary corporation was then used to manage proven properties and road companies, while the owning partnership took on new productions and star contracts.

== Growth ==
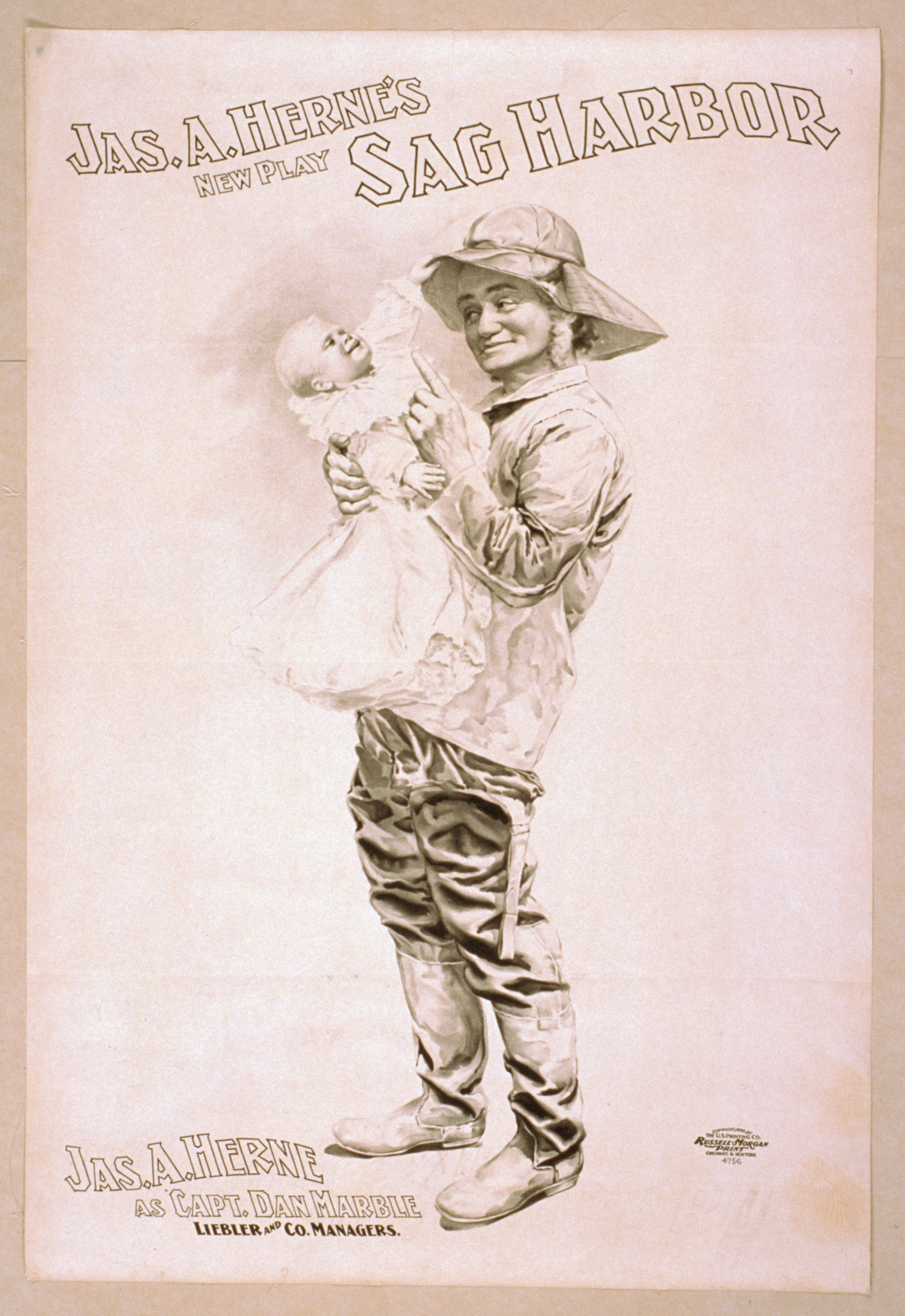

Liebler & Co. cast James O'Neill to appear in an adaptation of Dumas' The Three Musketeers by Sydney Grundy called simply The Musketeers. It didn't do well in America, so O'Neill was shifted to a revival of Charles Fechter's adaptation of The Count of Monte Cristo which was more successful. Liebler & Co. then signed James A. Herne to a management contract, and agreed to produce his Sag Harbor if he would stage Israel Zangwill's Children of the Ghetto. Sag Harbor did well, but Children of the Ghetto ran into opposition on Broadway from both drama critics (Note: Author Zangwill's 1898 lecture tour on the failings of dramatic criticism was remembered with pique by the reviewer for the Brooklyn Daily Eagle.) and the local Jewish community, who felt it trivialized sacred matters.

Tyler signed Mrs. Patrick Campbell for an American tour in January 1902. Liebler wrote that she was not only a great actress but also a master of "self-advertisement", charming reporters by allowing them to interview her pet dog and throwing pretty fits of temperament. She had demanded to bring her own choice of actors with her, and was given a salary allowance that went much further in England than it would have in America. Thus she brought with her George Arliss, who would become a star for Liebler & Company when they produced Disraeli in 1911.

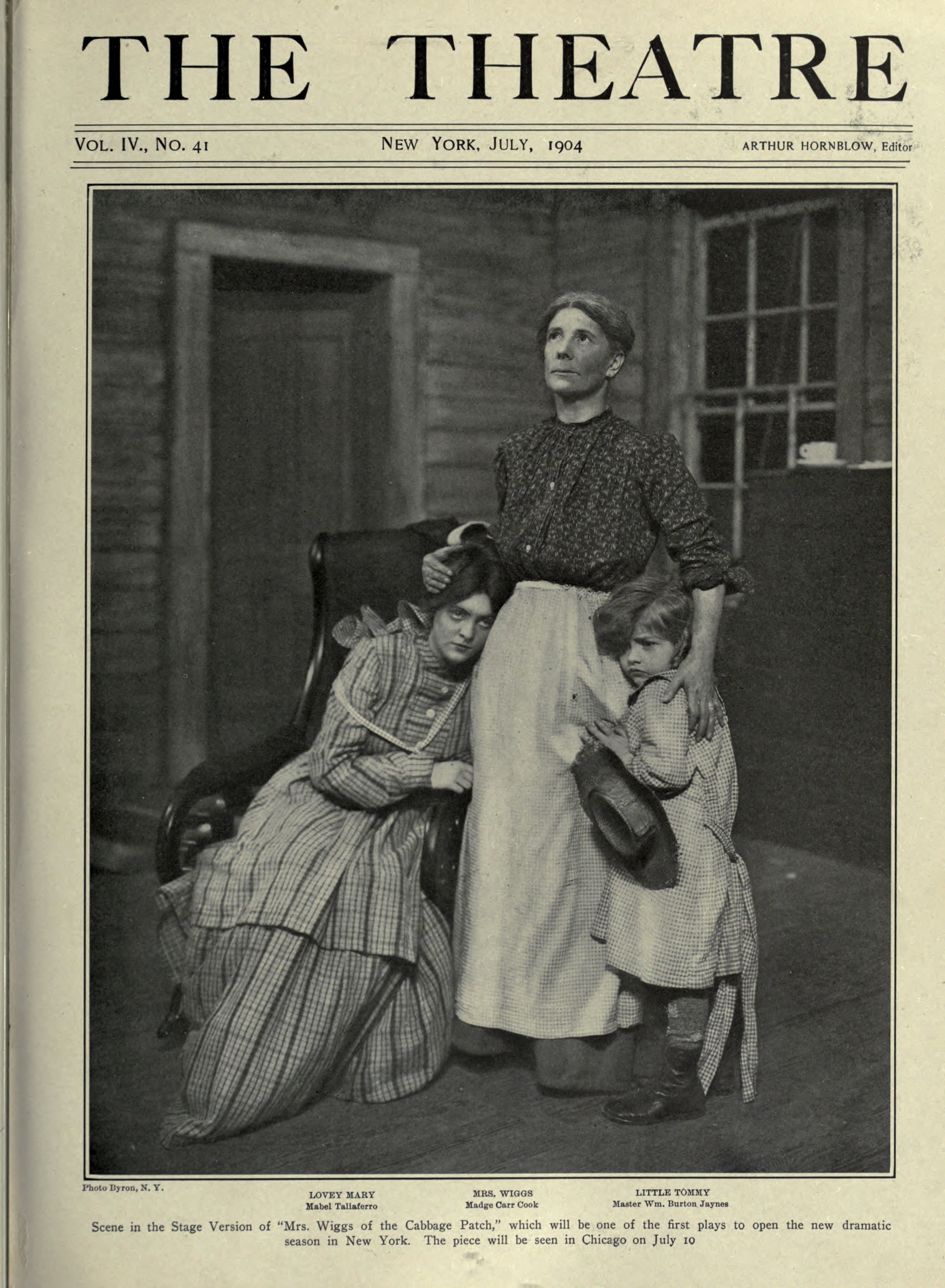

A financially less successful but artistically more important tour was sponsored by Liebler & Company in the latter part of 1902, when they brought Eleonora Duse and her company to America. A ground-breaking actress, Duse insisted on performing only in plays by Gabriele D'Annunzio, which proved too morbid and advanced for commercial audiences in the United States. Despite losing $60,000 on the tour, T. A. Liebler thought it worthwhile for American stage producers to experience the "semi-impressionistic" innovations of Francesca da Rimini. Liebler & Company more than made up for the loss with three very successful plays that premiered in 1903. Raffles, The Amateur Cracksman was an adaption of two E. W. Hornung stories, which starred Kyrle Bellew. Co-written with the author by Liebler & Company's stage director, Eugene Presbrey, it played well on Broadway until forced to close by prior scheduling. It then had an exceptionally long run in London's West End.

Despite having lost money on Israel Zangwill in 1899, Liebler & Company produced his Merely Mary Ann, starring Tyler's discovery Eleanor Robson. (Note: Tyler had found her playing a small role in Arizona in Chicago during 1899, and quickly signed her to a contract. Years later, another Tyler discovery, Helen Hayes, would lament his endless recollections of Eleanor Robson.) It was a popular success, and Eleanor Robson's performance inspired George Bernard Shaw to write Major Barbara for her. That same year, J. M. Barrie suggested to Tyler that he investigate the books of Alice Hegan Rice. Tyler did, and immediately commissioned the dramatization of Mrs. Wiggs of the Cabbage Patch by Anne Crawford Flexner. A mild success on Broadway, it had a years-long run on tour and became Liebler & Company's most rewarding production.

== Heyday ==
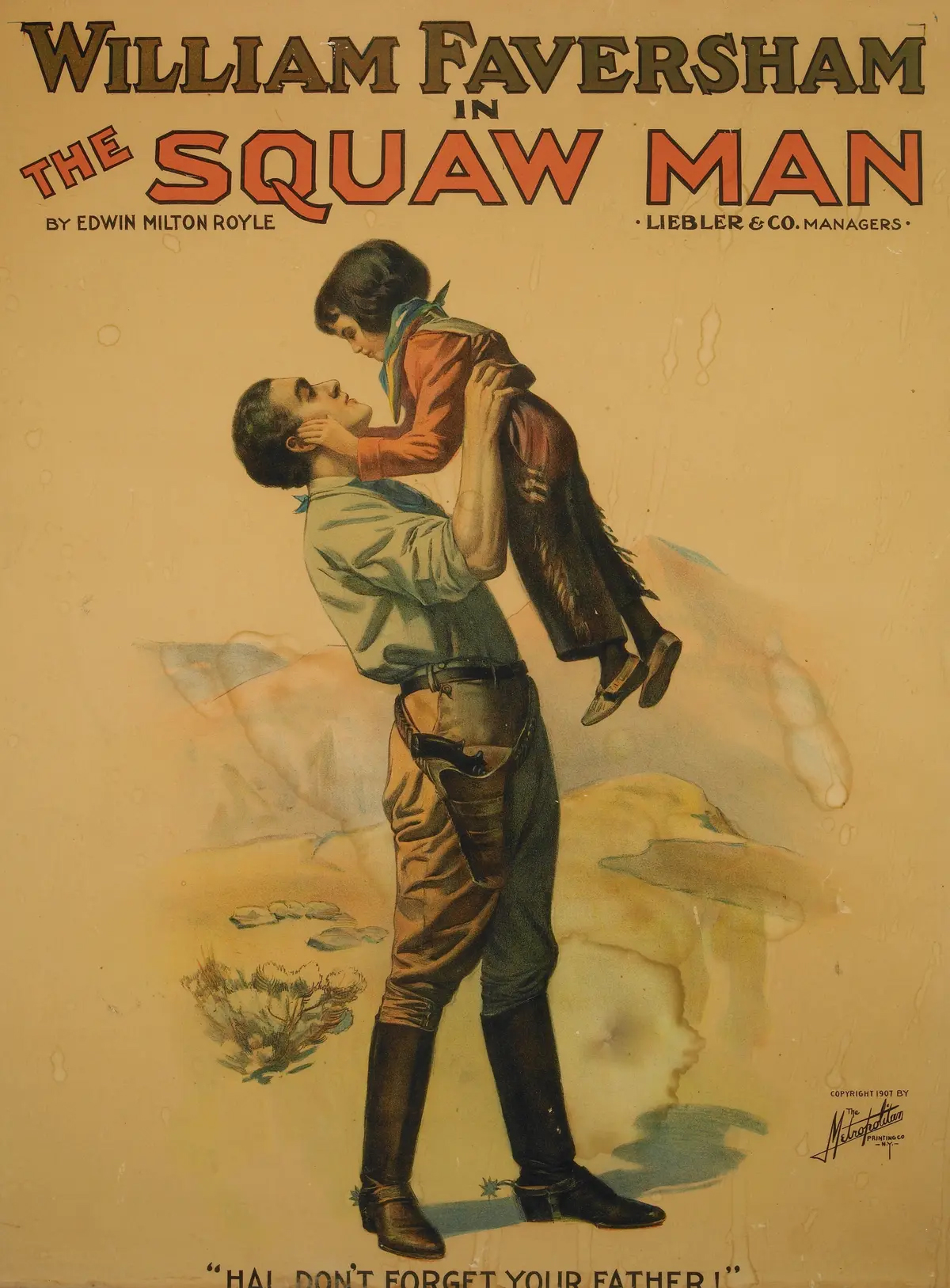

The Squaw Man, written and staged by Edwin Milton Royle, was still a running success for Liebler & Company in Chicago during October 1905, when they suddenly moved the production to Broadway. The Brooklyn Daily Eagle reported the precipitous switch "was designed to forestall David Belasco and The Girl of the Golden West". The western melodrama had good critical reviews, and proved a popular success, running for six months on Broadway.

Liebler & Company hired Hugh Ford to stage plays in 1905, and within six months he had become their general stage director. Ford was a prodigious worker, directing and sometimes rewriting dozens of plays per season. He drew praise from English author Louis N. Parker for his work on Liebler & Company productions of Pomander Walk (1907) and Disraeli,, and survived three collaborations, Salomy Jane (1907), Alias Jimmy Valentine (1909), and The Deep Purple (1910), with the volatile American playwright Paul Armstrong. (Note: Armstrong, whom H. L. Mencken said looked like a train robber, had been arrested on three different occasions for assault.) Ford's enthusiasm for the stage failed to win over O. Henry, however, who drew a gun on him when he made suggestions for changes in a play commissioned by Liebler & Company.

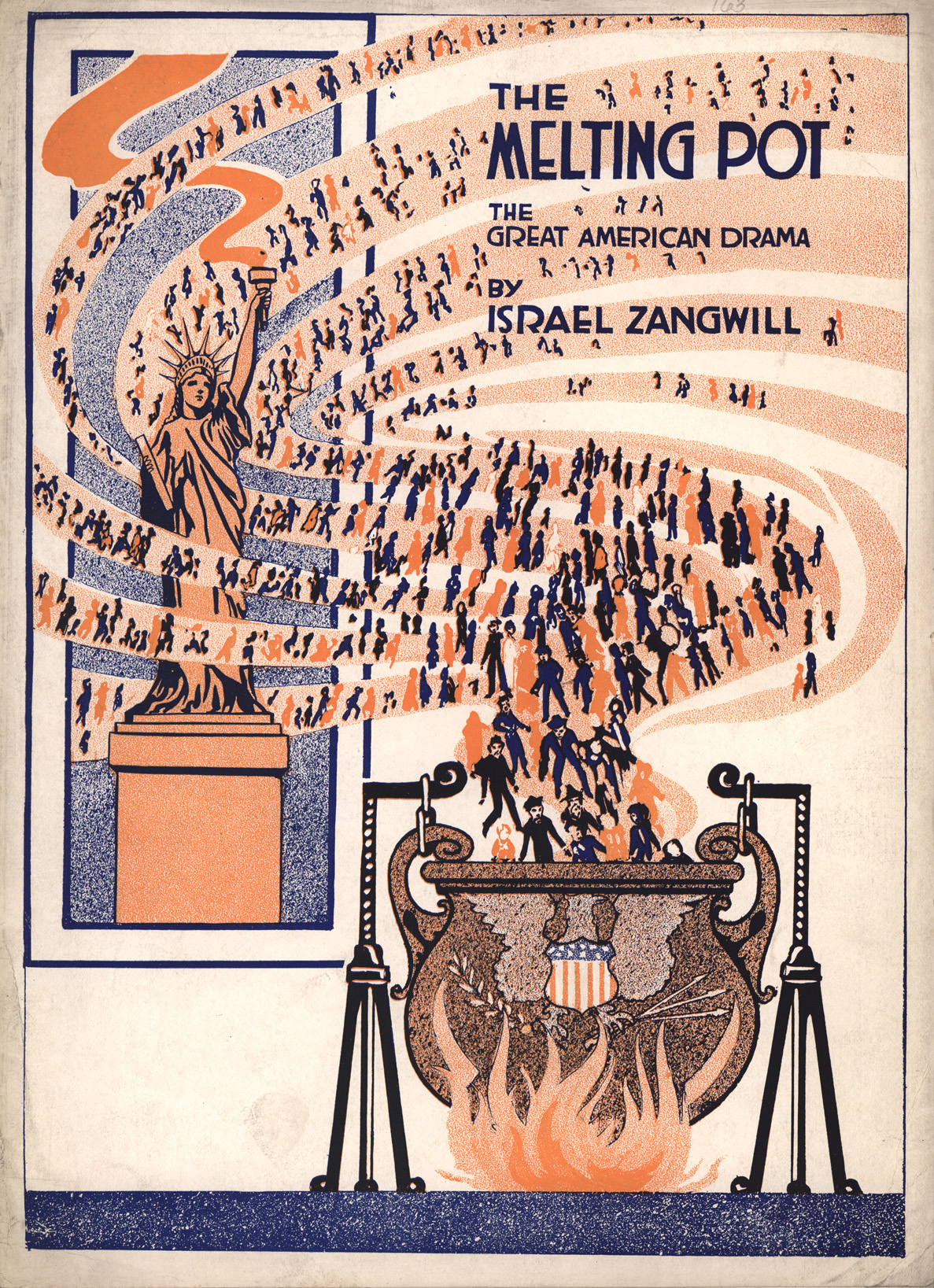

William Hodge had played characters in Liebler & Company's Sag Harbor and Mrs. Wiggs of the Cabbage Patch. A discovery of James A. Herne, he became a star as the title role in The Man from Home during 1908. Booth Tarkington co-wrote the play with Harry Leon Wilson; the latter told George C. Tyler that the play was written with Hodge in mind. This was revenge on Tarkington's part, for Hodge bore a marked resemblance to fellow Hoosier author and rival, George Ade, who had once put Tarkington into a play. The Man from Home proved very successful on Broadway for Liebler & Company, running for well over a year.

Liebler & Company had another popular play from Israel Zangwill in October 1908, with The Melting Pot. A metaphor for the process of immigration to America, Zangwill clarified in a 1914 essay that the end product was not uniform assimilation, but enrichment. The play was praised by President Theodore Roosevelt upon its initial performance in Washington, D.C., but was panned by The New York Times reviewer when it reached Broadway on September 6, 1909. Broadway audiences ignored the criticism, and The Melting Pot had a respectable run through to January 1, 1910.

By January 1911, Liebler & Company had five productions running on Broadway at the same time, (Note: These were Mary Magdalene at The New Theatre, Pomander Walk at Wallack's Theatre, Daddy Dufard at the Hackett Theater, Marriage a la Carte at the Casino Theatre, and The Silent Call at the Broadway Theatre.) while during 1912 The Green Book Magazine reported that the partnership "now controls almost one sixth of the legitimate dramatic attractions in the United States".

== The Abbey Players ==
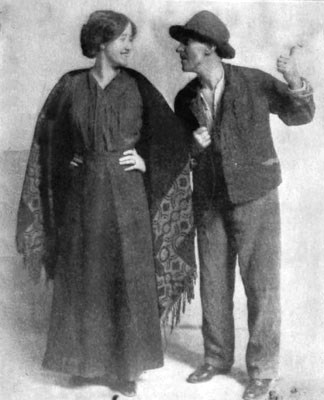
Sara Allgood and J. M. Kerrigan in Playboy of the Western World

"It took me quite a while to get my breath back when I learned that $750 a week would cover the salary guarantee for the whole troupe... But they didn't give a hoot about money-- that was one thing you had to learn at the Abbey-- and they enjoyed their work more than any other actors I ever saw in my life. They were that rare phenomenon, a real troupe, not just an accidental grouping of performers." —George C. Tyler on the Abbey Players

Liebler & Co. brought the Abbey Players (Note: In America at this time they were known as the Irish Players.) over from Dublin in September 1911 for their first North American tour. Lady Gregory, Lennox Robinson, and W. B. Yeats accompanied the Players. George C. Tyler was aware of trouble looming with the Ancient Order of Hibernians (AOH) over the Players' featured work, The Playboy of the Western World by John Millington Synge. This play had caused disturbances in Dublin when first presented there in January 1907. To forestall the same in Boston, the tour's first stop, Tyler had Mayor John F. Fitzgerald give an opening curtain speech, while the Players presented "safe" works (Note: Among these were The Shadow of the Glen and The Well of the Saints by Synge; Kathleen ni Hoolihan by W. B. Yeats; The Harvest and The Crossroads by Lennox Robinson; Birthright by T. C. Murray; Hyacinth Halvey, The Rising of the Moon, The Jail Gate, and Spreading the News by Lady Gregory.) for their first three weeks. When The Playboy was finally presented in October, local opposition in Boston was confined to a few hisses in the Plymouth Theatre and some newspaper editorials.

However, the United Irish-American Societies had met and voted to prevent production of The Playboy of the Western World in New York City, suggesting they might resort to "drastic measures". Liebler & Company brought the Abbey Players to Maxine Elliott's Theatre in November 1911, following the same strategy as in Boston of performing less controversial works for the first week. All went well until November 27, 1911, when The Playboy was finally presented. George C. Tyler had hired dozens of off-duty plainclothesmen, headed up by Charles Becker, who were scattered around the theater. When Fred O'Donovan as the playboy boasted to Margaret Flaherty (actress Eithne MaGee) that he'd killed his own father, the rioting began. Instigators in the audience, both male and female, hissed, stood on their seats, and threw vegetables and stink-bombs at the actors. When the critic for The Sun offered to press charges, Becker's plainclothesmen started hustling offenders out of the theatre. They didn't go quietly; Lady Gregory later told The New York Times that the violence was worse than anything the Players had seen in Dublin. The actors on stage paused the play as they dodged projectiles, and even brought out cups of tea to sip. Stage manager J. M. Kerrigan reassured Tyler the curtain would stay open, while "the actors took their tea and looked on at the fun as connoisseurs". After the rioters were removed, the play was restarted from Act I for the remaining audience.

== The Century Theatre ==
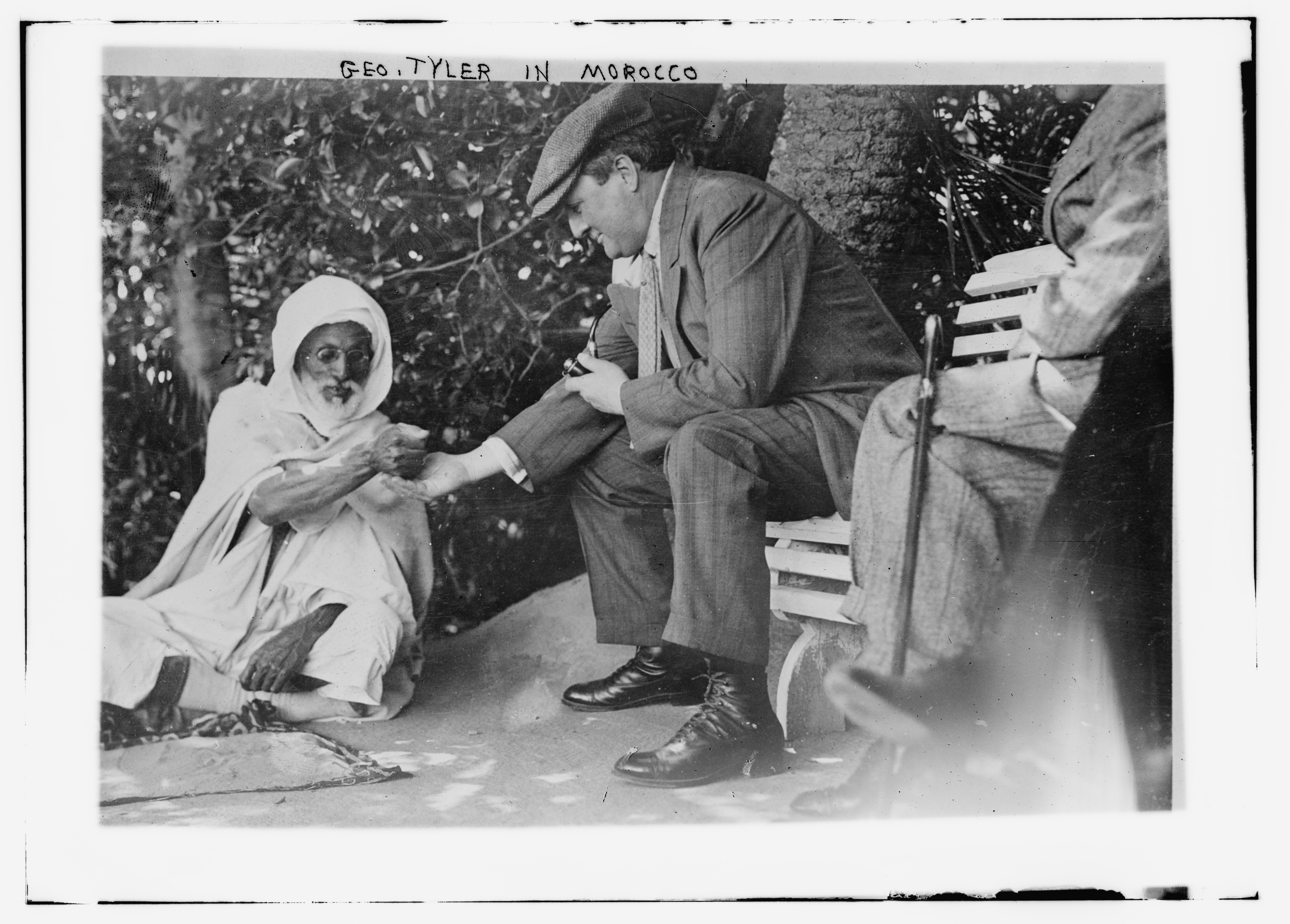
Tyler in Morocco

The partnership took a managerial lease on the massive Century Theatre in 1911 for their spectacle The Garden of Allah. George C. Tyler, with director Hugh Ford and set designer Edward A. Morange, met English playwright Robert Hichens in Biskra, Algeria during April 1911. They visited the real locales that inspired Hichens, collected material for use in the production, and recruited inhabitants of the area as performers. The play was a commercial success, celebrated for its large numbers of authentic Algerian people, live animals, and complex set designs and effects. Reviewers though said it was merely episodic and lacked dramatic appeal. Over 375,000 people saw it during the eight-month Broadway run, the largest viewership of any play up to that time.

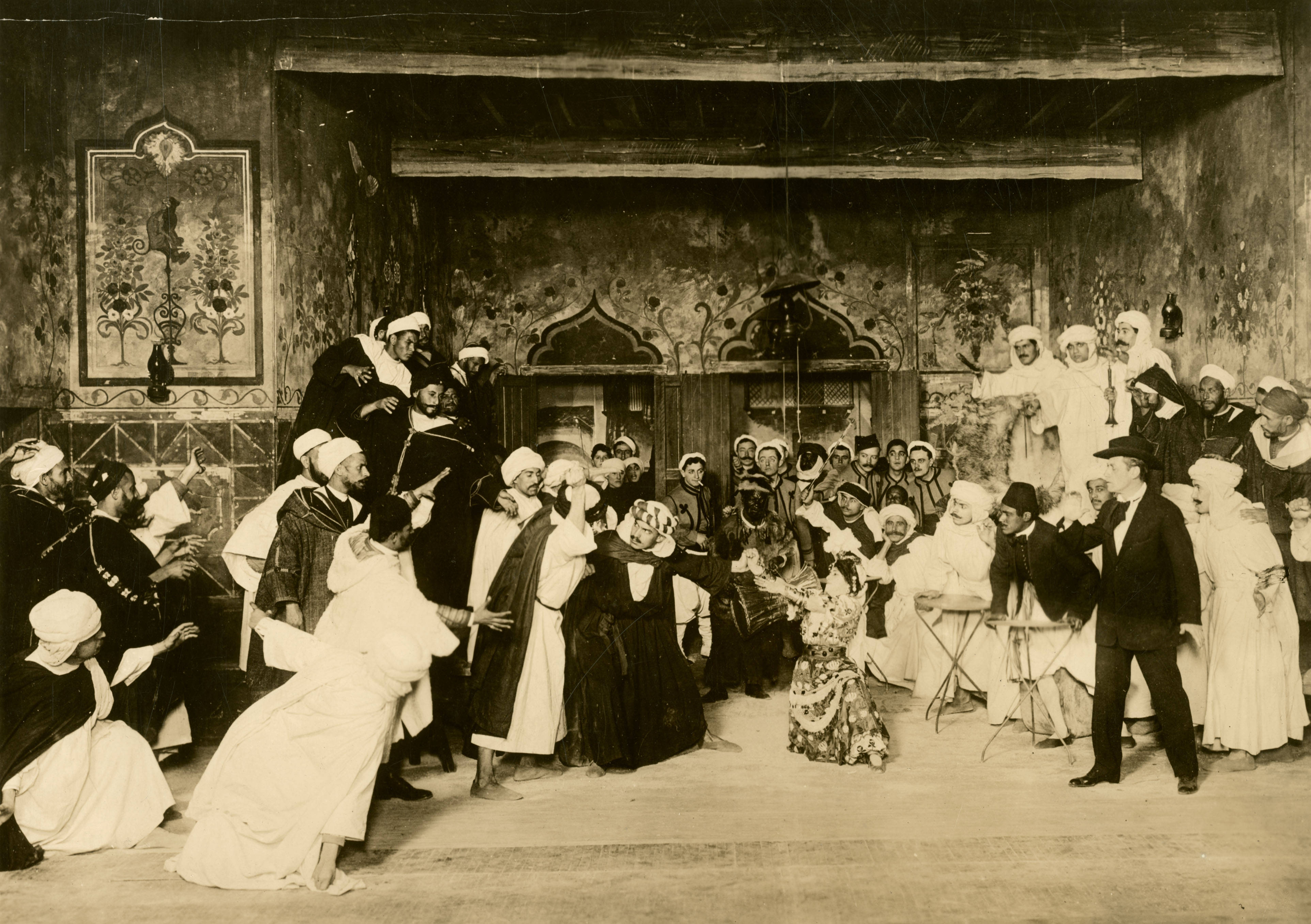

The Garden of Allah had proved a long-running success for Liebler & Company. Their second spectacle at the Century, The Daughter of Heaven (La fille du ciel) by Pierre Loti and Judith Gautier, however, was not well received. The Century, with its huge stage and numerous floors of dressing rooms served by elevators, was an expensive venue to keep running. Liebler & Company were happy to produce Louis N. Parker's spectacle Joseph and His Brethren, as it made back the money lost on The Daughter of Heaven. The partnership then received an offer from the Angelini-Gattini Opera Company of Milan to take over the lease of the Century, which they were glad to accept, given the expense of running it.

== Demise ==
After disposing of the Century Theater lease, Liebler & Co. avoided spectacles until a play by Edward Sheldon came their way in 1914. Taken from Hans Christian Andersen, it was called The Garden of Paradise, even though it was based on The Little Mermaid rather than Andersen's The Garden of Paradise. There were four acts and nine unique settings, designed by Joseph Urban. The Park Theatre had undergone expansion and upgrades in order to present the work. Some idea of its intricate mechanics may be discerned from a newspaper account which said the first scene took place under the sea, and not one of the twenty-five principal players in it ever touched the stage. Mechanical difficulties caused repeated postponements; finally, The Garden of Paradise opened at the Park Theatre on Saturday, November 28, 1914.

The extravagant costs for mounting The Garden of Paradise drained Liebler & Co.'s cash reserves. The recent advent of war in Europe had lenders holding onto their cash at the time, while films were eating away the profits of Liebler's road companies. The company was placed into involuntary receivership on December 4, 1914, with The Garden of Paradise being shut down on December 8, 1914. Among the creditors insisting on the receivership was Gates & Morange, the longtime set designers for Liebler & Company productions. One result of Liebler & Company's demise was the nascent Actors' Equity Association was able to successfully argue that the actors employed by the company were "privileged creditors", and entitled to compensation for unpaid wages.

== Bibliography ==
- Robert Grau. Forty Years Observation of Music and the Drama. Broadway Publishing Company, 1909.
- Alfred Harding. The Revolt of the Actors. William Morrow & Company, 1929.
- George C. Tyler and J. C. Furnas. Whatever Goes Up. Bobbs Merrill, 1934.
- Helen Hayes and Sandford Dody. On Reflection: An Autobiography. M. Evans and Company, 1968.
- Edna Nahshon, From the Ghetto to the Melting Pot: Israel Zangwill's Jewish Plays (Wayne State University Press), 2006. ISBN 978-0-8143-2955-9
