= Plymouth Theatre (Boston) =

Theater in Boston, Massachusetts

Coordinates: 42°21′4.21″N 71°3′57.47″W

The Plymouth Theatre (1911–1957) of Boston, Massachusetts, was located on Stuart Street in today's Boston Theater District. (Note: The Plymouth Theatre was on "Eliot Street" until the street was later renamed "Stuart Street.") Architect Clarence Blackall designed the building for Liebler & Co. Performers included Henry Jewett, Bill "Bojangles" Robinson, 8-year-old Sammy Davis Jr., and Bette Davis. In October 1911, the touring Abbey Theatre presented Synge's Playboy of the Western World at the Plymouth; in the audience were W. B. Yeats, Isabella Stewart Gardner and Rose Fitzgerald Kennedy.

"The Shubert Organization of New York bought the Plymouth in 1927 and used it largely for tryouts of plays headed for New York or going on tour, and for some long run performances." In 1957 the building became the Gary Theater. (Note: "The Shuberts sold the theater to the Sack movie chain in 1957, and it was renamed the Gary. That fell to the wrecking ball in 1978.")

== Images ==
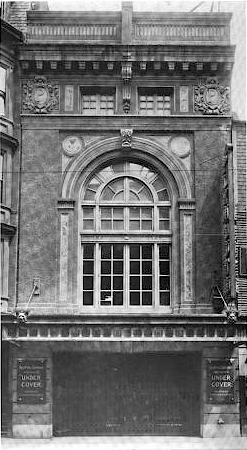
Plymouth Theatre, Boston, 1910s

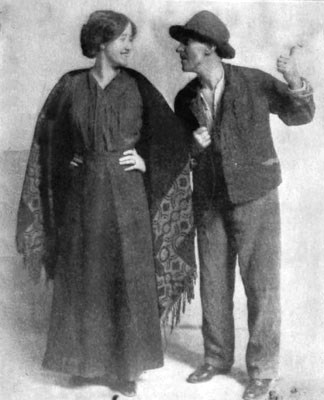
Irish actors Sara Allgood and J. M. Kerrigan in Synge's Playboy of the Western World, 1911

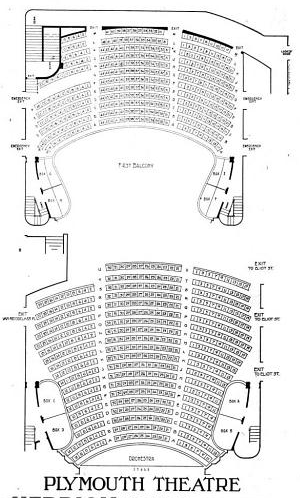
Seating chart, 1912

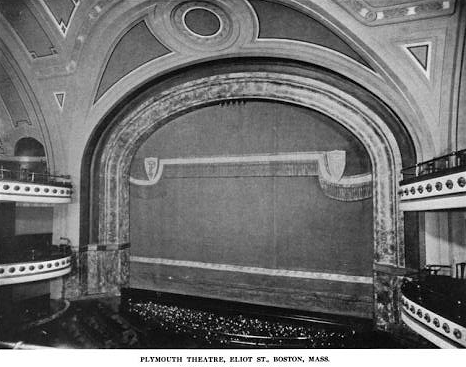
Interior, c. 1915

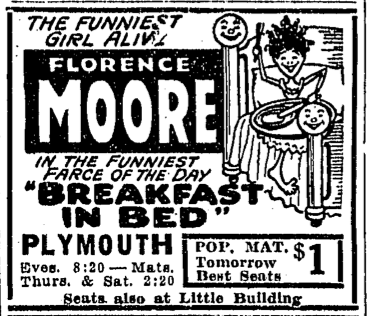
Advertisement, 1919

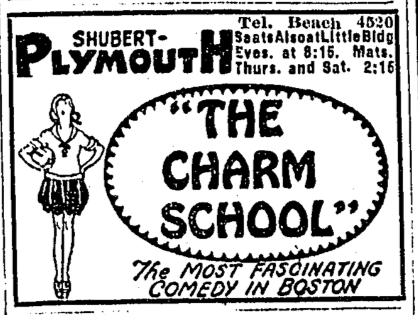
Advertisement, 1920

== Performances ==
=== 1910s ===
- Synge's Playboy of the Western World
- Worral & Terry's The White Feather
- Avery Hopwood's Sadie Love, with Marjorie Rambeau
- Heart o' th' Heather, with George FacFarlane
- John Galsworthy's Justice, with John Barrymore
- Otto Hauerbach's The Silent Witness
- G.B. Shaw's Getting Married, with William Faversham and Henrietta Crosman
- The Man Who Came Back
- Booth Tarkington's Seventeen, with Gregory Kelly
- She Walked in Her Sleep
- Breakfast in Bed, with Florence Moore

=== 1920s ===
- Alice Duer Miller's Charm School
- The Humming Bird, with Maude Fulton
- Charles Anthony's Pagans, with Irene Fenwick
- The Purple Mask, with Leo Ditrichstein
- Collison & Hopwood's Gertie's Garter, with Hazel Dawn
- John Galsworthy's The Skin Game
- Woman of Bronze, with Margaret Anglin
- Dog Love, with William Hodge
- Green Goddess, with George Arliss
- Ladies' Night

=== 1930s-1950s ===
- Lady Precious Stream

- Mademoiselle-1932-w Grace George and Alice Brady

Reflected Glory - 1936 w Tallulah Bankhead Blow Ye Winds - 1936 w Henry Fonda with Doris Dalton The Masque of Kings - 1936 w Henry Hill, Dudley Digges and Margo Pauline Frederick Susan and God - 1939 w Gertrude Lawrence and Paul McGrath Boys and Girls Together - 1940 w Ed Wynn and The De Marcos. "Kiss and tell" - 1943 by F.Hugh Herbert with Violet Heming Walter Gilbert and Betty Anne Nyman
