= Elsie Leslie =

American actress

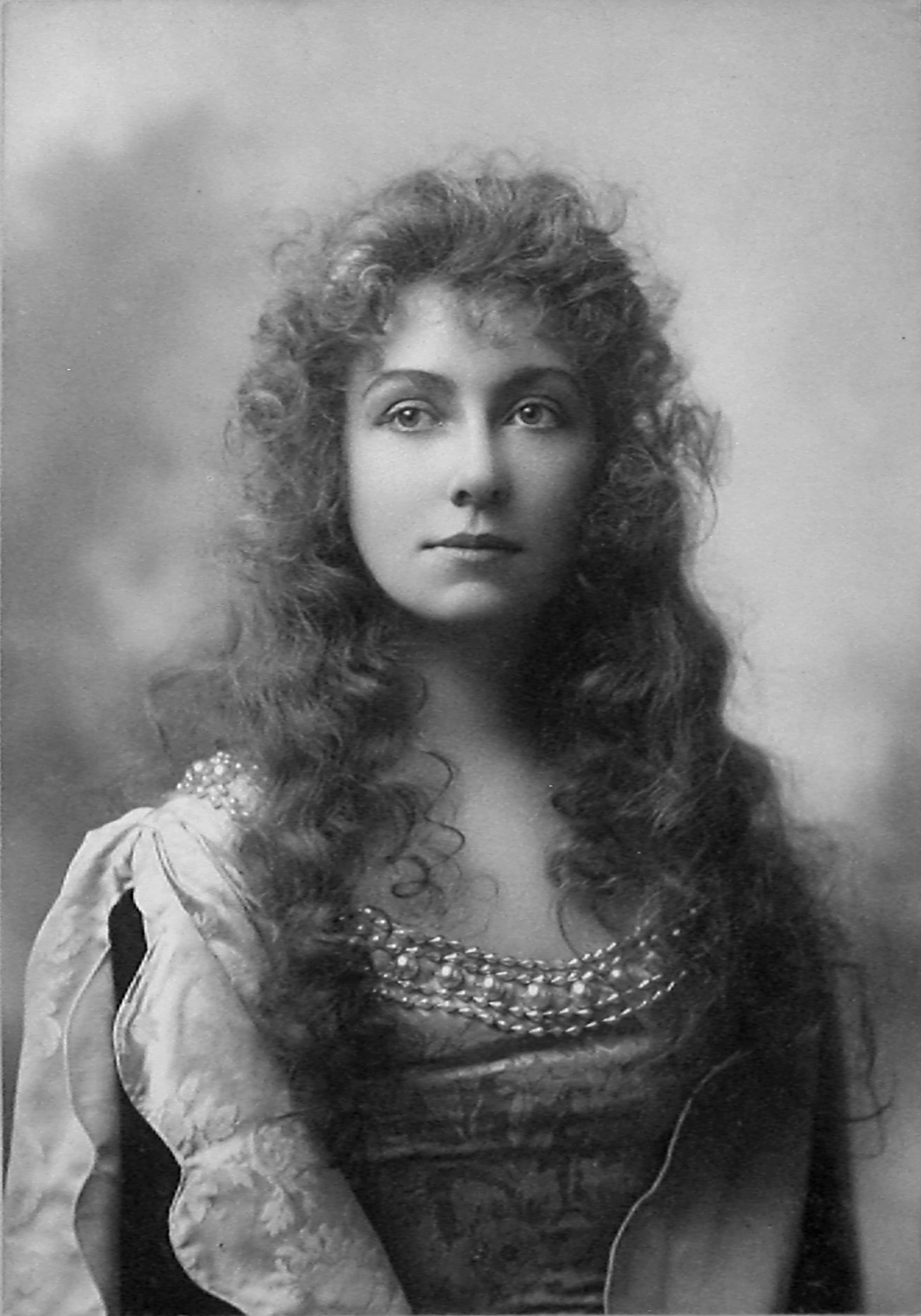
- Elsie Leslie by Otto Sarony
- Born: Elsie Leslie Lyde; August 14, 1881; New Jersey
- Died: October 31, 1966 (aged 85); New York City
- Occupation: Stage actress
- Years active: 1884-1911
- Known for: Little Lord Fauntleroy and The Prince and the Pauper
- Spouse(s): Jefferson "Percy" Winter; Edwin J. Millikin

Elsie Leslie (August 14, 1881 – October 31, 1966) was an American actress. She was America's first child star and the highest paid and most popular child actress of her era.

== Life and career ==
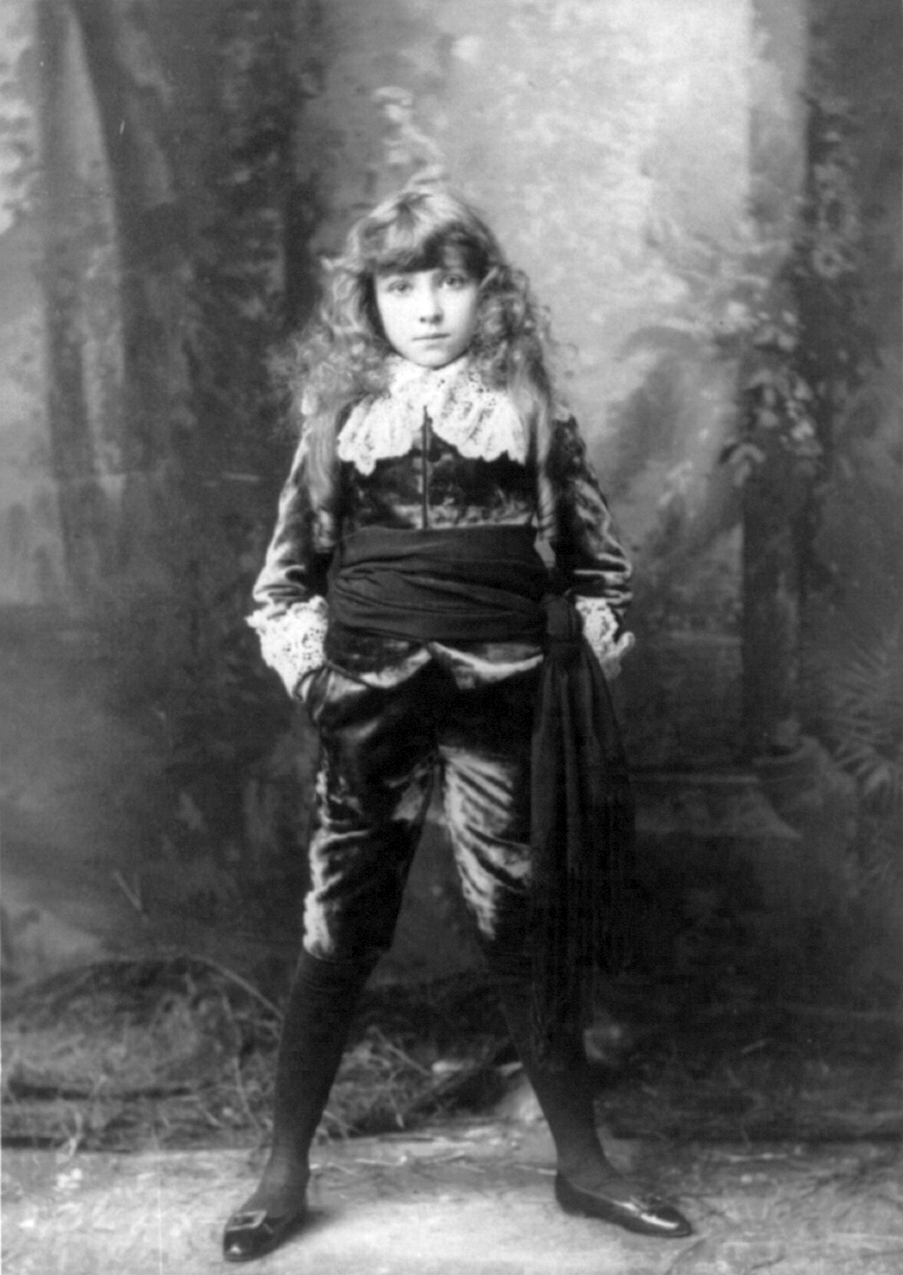
Elsie Leslie as Little Lord Fauntleroy (1888), photographed by Napoleon Sarony

Leslie's first role in 1884 was Little Meenie in Joseph Jefferson's production of Rip Van Winkle. In 1887, she was recognized as a star with her performance in Editha's Burglar opposite E.H. Sothern at the Lyceum Theatre in New York. She achieved further fame with her roles in Little Lord Fauntleroy in 1888 and The Prince and the Pauper in 1890. The most enduring image of Leslie is the portrait of her, posing as Little Lord Fauntleroy, painted by William Merritt Chase.

Leslie had pen pals everywhere with whom she maintained a lively correspondence, including leading actors, actresses and statesmen. "I like to write letters," she once said, "but I like to get the answers still better." Two of her correspondents were young girls nearer her own age, one younger, the other a year older: Eleanor Roosevelt and Helen Keller. Keller and Leslie met in 1890 when the latter was starring in Mark Twain's The Prince and the Pauper. Both girls shared a friendship with Leslie's patron, John Spaulding, and he called them his "two darlings".

Leslie took a break from acting, but returned to the stage in 1898 to play parts in The Rivals, The Cricket on the Hearth, The Christian, The Taming of the Shrew, The Man on the Case in 1907, and Louis N. Parker's Disraeli with George Arliss in 1911; but after years away from the stage she could not recapture the old magic as an adult. She had married Jefferson Winter, son of drama critic William Winter, but this marriage ended in divorce, after which Leslie married Edwin J. Millikin in 1918. She and her husband traveled the world until they returned to New York City, where she lived until her death in 1966.

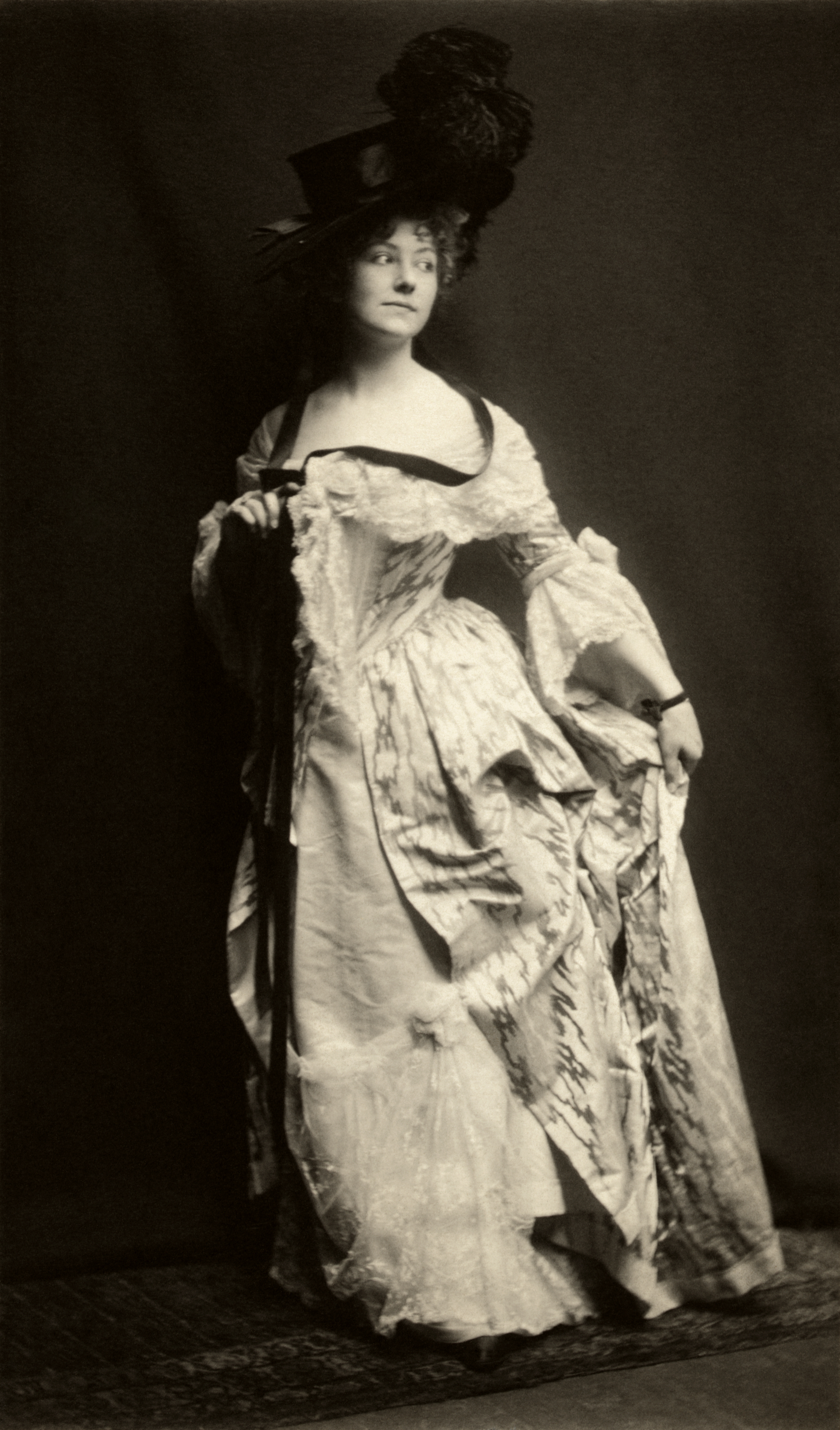
Elsie Leslie as Lydia Languish in Richard Brinsley Sheridan's play "The Rivals" in 1899, photographed by Zaida Ben-Yusuf.

Leslie carried on correspondence with her friends from her acting days until her death. Photographs of Leslie, parts of her diary, along with letters and cards from Mark Twain, Helen Keller, Edwin Booth, William Gillette, Elliott Roosevelt and Joseph Jefferson, are recorded in Trustable & Preshus Friends.

She is remembered by the Elsie Leslie doll by Madame Alexander, No. 1560 in the series.
