= Disraeli (play) =

1911 play by Louis N Parker

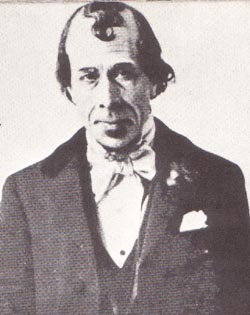
- George Arliss in Disraeli (1911)
- Original language: English
- Written by: Louis N. Parker
- Subject: Fictional depiction of Benjamin Disraeli
- Genre: Comedy
- Setting: Glastonbury Towers, Hughenden Manor, 10 Downing Street

Premiere
- Date: 18 September 1911
- Place: Wallack's Theatre, New York City
- Directed by: Hugh Ford

Disraeli is a play by the British writer Louis N. Parker. The comedy with dramatic overtones has four acts and four settings, with a large cast, and moderate pacing. It is a fictional depiction of Benjamin Disraeli's life around 1875, when he arranged the purchase of the Suez Canal. It also contains dual love stories: Disraeli and his wife, and a young couple.

The play was first produced by Liebler & Company, staged by Hugh Ford, with sets by Gates & Morange. It opened January 1911 in Montreal, was engaged in Chicago from February through April 1911, and had its Broadway première in September 1911. Its first season on Broadway ran through May 1912.

The play was a popular success for Arliss, and developed a loyal following. It became Arliss' signature role and he was strongly identified with it in popular culture. For Liebler & Company it represented a financial success, earning over $500,000.

== Characters ==
Other than Disraeli and his wife, titled characters and their estates are fictional. Characters are listed in order of appearance within their scope.

Lead

- Clarissa, Lady Pevensey is 19, the intelligent and spirited youngest daughter of the Duke of Glastonbury.
- Benjamin Disraeli is the prime minister of Great Britain, whose wife Mary calls him "Dizzy".

Supporting

- Duke of Glastonbury is a cabinet member who lives at a fictional residence in a real town.
- Duchess of Glastonbury called Belinda, is the humorless, rigid, and bigoted wife of the Duke.
- Charles, Vicount Deeford is 25, heir to the Duke of Dunelm, self-absorbed, idealistic, and a suitor for Clarissa.
- Mrs. Noel Travers called Agatha, is a charming young woman full of sly asides, a pursuer of political secrets.
- Lady Beaconsfield is the older wealthy wife of Disraeli, a lively and engaging woman in declining health. (Note: Her presence in this play is an historical liberty by the author, as she died three years before the events depicted.)
- Sir Michael Probert is Governor of the Bank of England. (Note: This was a fictional character not drawn from either of the two men who held that position during 1875.)
- Hugh Meyers is a Jewish financier, who is willing to aid Disraeli's plans for buying the Suez Canal.

Featured

- Adolphus, Vicount Cudworth is a son-in-law of the Duke and Duchess, called Dolly by his wife.
- Lady Cudworth called Ermyntrude, is a daughter of the Duke and Duchess, and wife of Adolphus.
- Lord Brooke is a son-in-law to the Duke and Duchess, has a strong lisp, and lives at Brooke Hill.
- Lady Brooke called Hildagarde, is a daughter of the Duke and Duchess, wife to Lord Brooke.
- Butler is the Duke of Glastonbury's butler.
- Mr. Tearle is Disraeli's clerk at Downing Street.
- Lumley Foljambe is a new assistant in Disraeli's Downing Street office, in league with Mrs. Travers.
- Bascot is Disraeli's butler, discreet and solicitous of his appearance and health.
- Potter is Disraeli's gardener, opposed to his master's keeping of peacocks.
- Flooks is a rural postman, who brings official mail in a locked bag to Disraeli's estate.

Bit Players

- Footman
- Diplomats
- Military attachés
- British officers
- Liveried servants
- Lords and Ladies

== Synopsis ==
In 1875, the British Prime Minister Benjamin Disraeli attempts to gain ownership of the Suez Canal, to secure Britain's route to India and to legitimize Queen Victoria's claim to be Empress of India. He must secure financing to do so, while thwarting a pair of Russian spies. Disraeli has to contend with prejudice from some characters because of his Jewish parentage, while Lady Beaconsfield is snubbed for having married a converted Jew. Parker gave no indication of the time between acts, but from exposition in each it must be several weeks at the minimum.

Act I (Octagonal room at Glastonbury Towers.) A garden room get-together allows six trivial titled characters, the Brookes, the Cudworths, and the Glastonburys, to deliver exposition on their family relationships. They also discuss guests who are not trivial: Disraeli, his wife Lady Beaconsfield, and Sir Michael Probert. There is also Mrs. Travers, a joker among the face cards, into everyone's business. Charles is there too, full of plans for model communities. He is jealous, as Disraeli has captured Clarissa's attention and admiration. Probert refuses to allow the Bank of England to fund purchase of the Khedive of Egypt's shares in the canal. Disraeli dismisses him with a warning the day may come when Probert's hand will be forced. Aware of Charles' hostility, Disraeli is impressed when he answers him frankly as to the cause. Disraeli confides to his wife his intention to match Charles and Clarissa, by turning the young man into someone she can admire. Disraeli disarms Charles by confiding his plans for "a ditch in the sand..." but Mrs. Travers intrudes, so he concludes with "...is best for planting celery". (Curtain)

Act II (Disraeli's private room at 10 Downing Street.) Charles is now working for Disraeli, who plays a cat-and-mouse game with another newcomer, Foljambe. Charles and Mr. Tearle are unaware of these dynamics. Foljambe tries to make off with dispatches from Russia, but is foiled by Disraeli, without an open fuss. Mr. Tearle announces Mr. Meyers. Disraeli lets Charles know Meyers has raised the funds for the Suez. Disraeli and Meyers go into a private conference room. Foljambe returns from an errand in time to see Meyers. He surprises Charles by asking is it about the Suez? Charles doesn't reply, but his face reveals everything. Clarissa and Mrs. Travers arrive; Foljambe passes the latter a note and leaves. When Clarissa and Charles are distracted, Mrs. Travers reads the note. As the couple step out on the balcony, she summons Foljambe. He is to leave for Ostend, where he will receive further orders for Egypt. When Charles tells Disraeli about Foljambe's question, he guesses what has happened. Disraeli tells Charles to immediately leave for Egypt to tender the offer, warning him of the personal danger. Clarissa tells Charles that win or lose the canal, she will oblige him upon his return. (Curtain)

Act III (Disraeli's study at Hughenden Manor.) Disraeli has gone to his estate to await word from Charles in Egypt. He is also concerned about his wife, who has had some fainting spells. Clarissa and Lady Beaconsfield are there when a telegram from Charles arrives: "The Suez Canal Purchase is completed and the cheque accepted". But the sudden entrance of Meyers brings disastrous news. He is bankrupt; a ship carrying his bullion was deliberately scuttled, and rumors are being broadcast in the city about his credit. Disraeli realizes both were accomplished through Mrs. Travers and her Russian employers. Disraeli sends Meyers back to London, and urges him to do nothing. Mrs. Travers arrives, and is decoyed into the garden by Clarissa. Disraeli sends Lady Beaconsfield to fetch Probert, who lives nearby. He then confronts Mrs. Travers alone; the masks are off and she admits to having triggered the bankruptcy. When Probert arrives with Lady Beaconsfield, Disraeli reminds him of his earlier warning. Unless Probert has the Bank of England grant Meyers unlimited credit, honoring his check drawn on the bank for £5 million, Disraeli will have the House of Commons withdraw the bank's charter. Probert, fearing disgrace, reluctantly assents. He departs, (Note: This dialogue and what follows were added during a rewrite while playing Chicago in February 1911.) angrily exclaiming how terrible a man like you should hold power. Clarissa is delighted that Disraeli has so much power, but he admits "I haven't, dear child, but he doesn't know that". (Curtain)

Act IV (Grand reception room at 10 Downing Street.) The Suez now safely under British ownership, Disraeli has coerced the Commons into granting Victoria the title Empress of India. The diplomatic and aristocratic grandees of London have gathered at a reception to await the Queen's arrival to officially receive the honor. Clarissa, however, waits for Charles' imminent return from Egypt, while Disraeli misses Lady Beaconfield's company and dreads expected news of her final moments. Charles enters to joyous reunion with Clarissa, who breaks off when a telegram is brought to Disraeli. He cannot bring himself to open it, until a tap on his shoulder from behind reveals a smiling Lady Beaconsfield. The telegram was just to announce her recovery and expected attendance. (Final curtain)

== Original production ==
=== Background ===
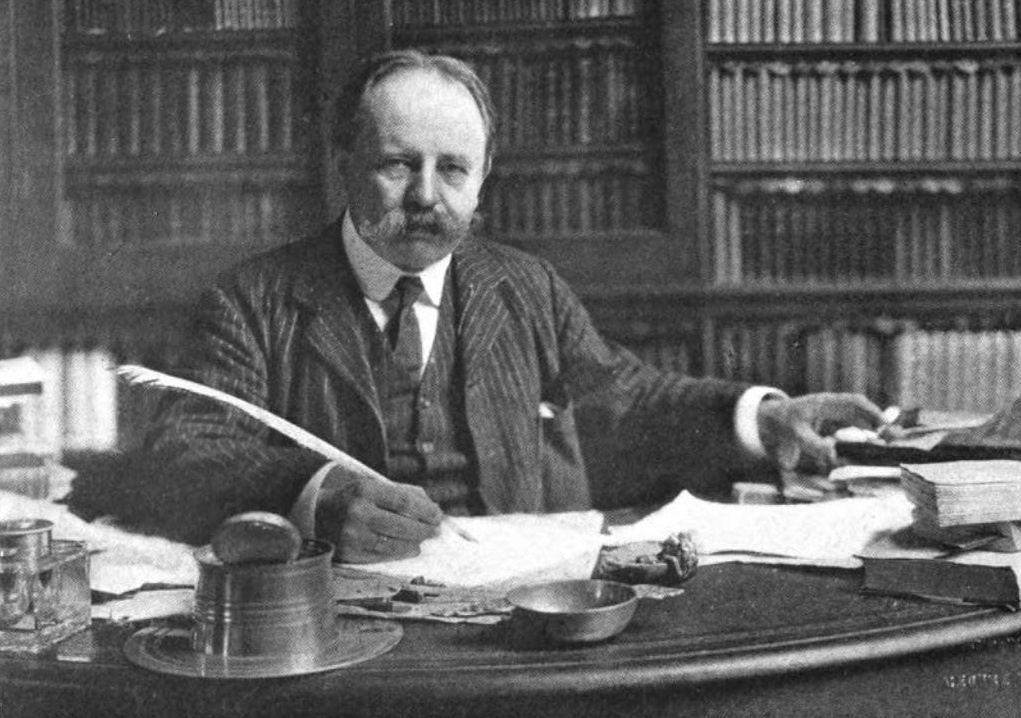
Louis N. Parker

Liebler & Company was a partnership between investor T. A. Liebler and producer-manager George C. Tyler. In his 1934 memoir, Tyler says he first met George Arliss when the latter was a supporting actor for Mrs. Patrick Campbell. Liebler & Company had signed her to a management contract and brought her from England for her first American tour. When Tyler ran into Arliss at the St. Nicholas Hotel in Cincinnati some years later, he was performing in a dismal failure and wondering where he could get a good play. Over several days they pondered together and came up with a notion that the life of Benjamin Disraeli might yield some good material. Liebler & Company had already produced Louis N. Parker's Pomander Walk, and Tyler said Parker "wrote Disraeli for us".

Robert M. Fells says Arliss saw a portrayal of the Victorian British statesman Benjamin Disraeli as an ideal vehicle for his stage career. It was written in London during 1910. Parker suffered from writer's block at one point and received some assistance from Arliss. Parker included a subplot lifted from the 1839 play Richelieu by Edward Bulwer-Lytton which was later the subject of some controversy. He added a number of fictitious characters to add excitement and drama to the story. The real role of Lionel de Rothschild in the purchase was changed to that of the fictional banker Meyers.

=== Cast ===
Principal cast for the opening tour and during the original Broadway run. The production was on hiatus from 30 April through 10 September 1911.
Role	Actor	Dates	Notes and sources
Clarissa, Lady Pevensey	Elsie Leslie	23 Jan 1911 – 18 May 1912	
Benjamin Disraeli	George Arliss	23 Jan 1911 – 18 May 1912	
Duke of Glastonbury	Charles Carey	23 Jan 1911 – 18 May 1912	
Duchess of Glastonbury	Leila Repton	23 Jan 1911 – 18 May 1912	
Mrs. Noel Travers	Margaret Dale	23 Jan 1911 – 18 May 1912	
Charles, Vicount Deeford	Courtenay Foote	23 Jan 1911 – 29 Apr 1911	
Charles, Vicount Deeford	Ian Maclaren	11 Sep 1911 – 15 Apr 1912	
Charles, Vicount Deeford	TBA	16 Apr 1912 – 20 Apr 1912	MacLaren covered for Lee Baker in The Garden of Allah due to latter's illness.
Charles, Vicount Deeford	Ian Maclaren	22 Apr 1912 – 18 May 1912	
Lady Beaconsfield	Marguerite Saint-John	23 Jan 1911 – 18 May 1912	Saint-John was often credited as "St. John" and occasionally as "Margaret".
Sir Michael Probert	David Torrence	23 Jan 1911 – 29 Apr 1911	
Sir Michael Probert	Herbert Standing	11 Sep 1911 – 18 May 1912	
Hugh Meyers	J. L. Mackay	23 Jan 1911 – 29 Apr 1911	
Hugh Meyers	Oscar Adye	11 Sep 1911 – 18 May 1912	
Adolphus, Vicount Cudworth	Geoffrey Douglas	23 Jan 1911 – 29 Apr 1911	
Adolphus, Vicount Cudworth	J. R. Torrens	11 Sep 1911 – 18 May 1912	
Lady Cudworth	Constance Kirkham	23 Jan 1911 – 29 Apr 1911	
Lady Cudworth	Frances Reeve	11 Sep 1911 – 18 May 1912	
Lord Brooke	Guy Cunningham	23 Jan 1911 – 18 May 1912	
Lady Brooke	Josephine Bernhardt	23 Jan 1911 – 29 Apr 1911	
Lady Brooke	Marie R. Quinn	11 Sep 1911 – 18 May 1912	
Butler	Harry Chessman	23 Jan 1911 – 18 May 1912	
Mr. Tearle	Dudley Digges	23 Jan 1911 – 18 May 1912	
Lumley Foljambe	Alexander Calvert	23 Jan 1911 – 18 May 1912	
Bascot	Douglas Ross	23 Jan 1911 – 18 May 1912	
Potter	St. Clair Bayfield	23 Jan 1911 – 18 May 1912	
Flooks	Wilfrid Seagram	23 Jan 1911 – 29 Apr 1911	
Flooks	W. Mayne Lynton	11 Sep 1911 – 18 May 1912	

=== Opening tour ===
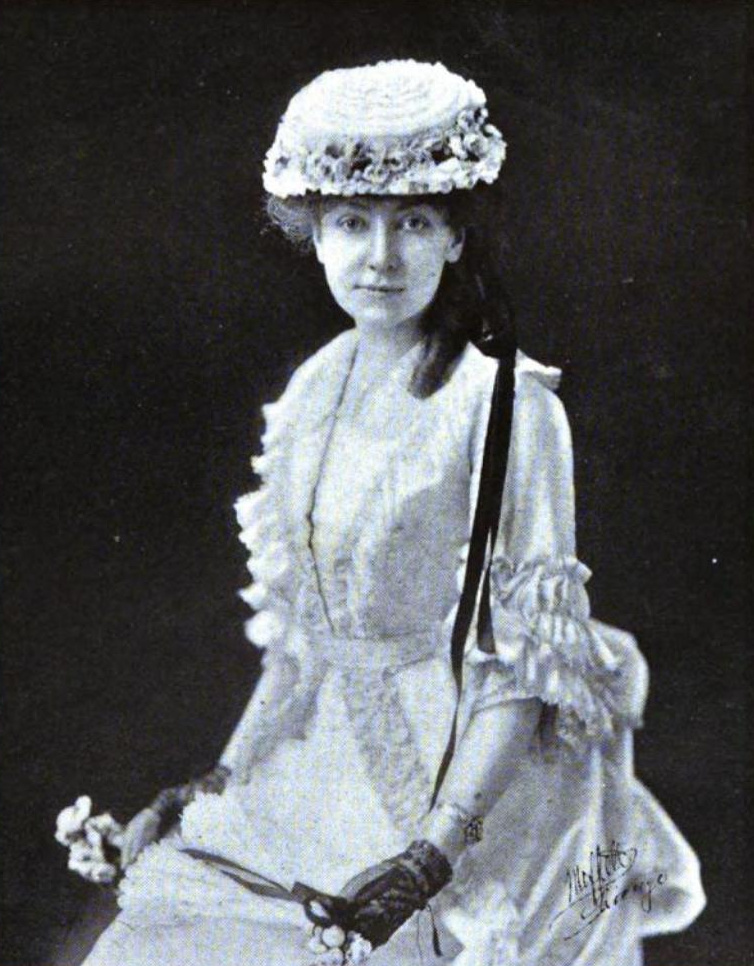
Elsie Leslie as Clarissa

The first performance of Disraeli was at the Princess Theatre in Montreal on 23 January 1911. The reviewer for The Montreal Gazette reported the attendance was nearly at capacity, with Mayor Guerin and his party occupying a box. The audience demanded curtain calls after each act, while Louis N. Parker was obliged to give a curtain speech after the third act, and Arliss spoke after the final curtain. The reviewer was most taken with the way Arliss, formerly a comical actor, met the challenge posed by portraying Disraeli: "The personality of the actor had expanded to the scope of the role".

After a week in Montreal, the production made a three-day stop at Detroit. It then played brief dates in Toledo and Columbus, Ohio, but a sudden booking opening in Chicago led to Liebler & Company cancelling other "whistle stops". At Chicago, Disraeli opened at the Grand Opera House on 13 February 1911. Percy Hammond of the Chicago Tribune was most impressed with George Arliss' impersonation of a figure not well known to Americans. He felt the play worked until the third act, where the concluding incidents were a bit dull, while the fourth act was "one of those impossible soire scenes with a lot of wax figures". Eric DeLamarter wrote in The Inter Ocean that the "comedy is handicapped by the fog in the public's mind as to who Disraeli was". He said "the story falls down hard at the end of the second act", wherein the demonstrated ineptness of Charles is overcome by a Disraeli pep talk.

Theatrical gossip in the Chicago Tribune two weeks after the opening there, mentioned that Louis Parker had been called back to Chicago by producer Tyler and George Arliss. It went on to mention rewriting in the third act. As Tyler recounted it, Parker added an exchange of lines between Clarissa and Disraeli after Probert was dismissed, but the real trigger was a "haughty exit line" by Probert just before that. It was a successful interpolation, with the Chicago run continuing for a total of 95 performances before closing on 29 April 1911.

=== Broadway premiere and reception ===
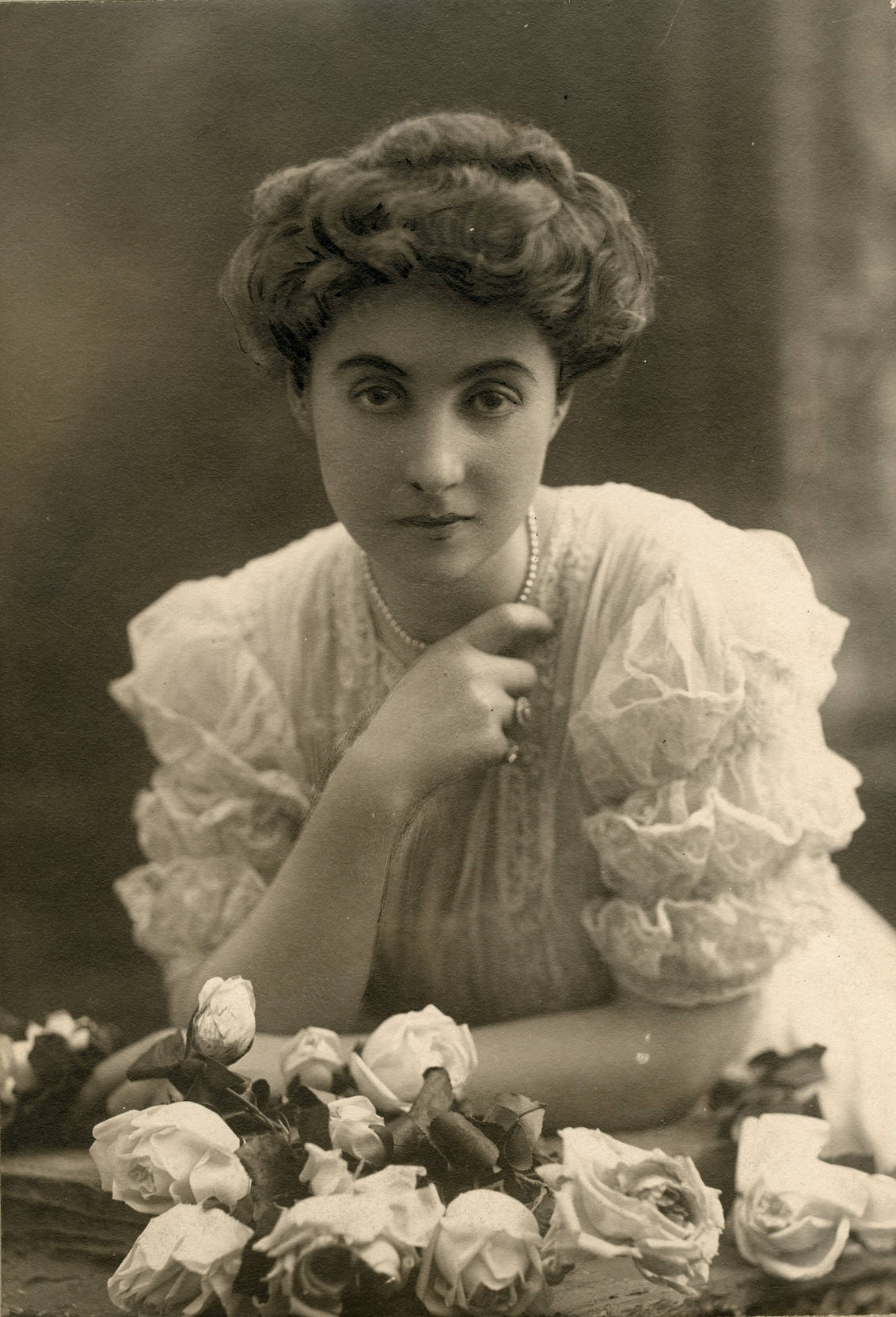
Margaret Dale

Following a long summer hiatus, the production reopened in Pittsburgh's Alvin Theatre for a week's shakedown run (Note: There were seven new players among the cast, which was now all English save for Americans Elsie Leslie and Margaret Dale.) starting 11 September 1911. Clarence M. Bregg of the Pittsburgh Post-Gazette reported the local audience's instant acceptance of the play, and especially praised the acting of Margaret Dale, Elsie Leslie, and newcomer Ian Maclaren, now playing Charles.

The Broadway premiere occurred the next week, at Wallack's Theatre, on 18 September 1911. The reviewer for the New-York Tribune said the writing and Arliss' performance both worked, and the play would have a long run. This brief report, despite the play's enthusiastic reception by the first-night audience, was a common reaction to Disraeli by New York critics. Though it had "firm dramatic foundations" and was well staged, costumed, and performed, it was little more than a historical character sketch, and "pretty dull drama". Only in the third act did it come alive, when the author "gets dramatic value out of a financial transaction", and "the kindly, bantering lord" changes to the "enraged and dangerous Prime Minister".

The New York Times reviewer gave more attention to the play and its chief character than most critics, remarking on Parker's apology in the program notes for the many invented incidents and characters taking the place of real history. They also identified "the romance that engages us is that of lovers from whose lives the noonday sun has passed", Lady Beaconsfield and Disraeli. Their reunion in Act IV banishes "melancholy" and provides the perfect curtain closing finish.

=== Closing ===
The first Broadway season of Disraeli closed at Wallack's Theatre on 18 May 1912, after 287 performances. The production went on summer hiatus and was due to reopen at Wallack's the following September. The production would continue touring, eventually earning $500,000 for Liebler & Company.

== Adaptations ==
=== Film ===
The play was adapted for the screen on three occasions. The first was a 1916 British film, Disraeli, starring the stage actor Dennis Eadie. Arliss then managed to acquire the film rights to the work for $3,000 and in 1921 he appeared in the silent film version, Disraeli.

In 1929, following the sound revolution, Arliss made a sound remake, Disraeli, for Warner Bros.. The film was a major critical and popular success and Arliss won the Academy Award for Best Actor for his performance.

== Bibliography ==
- Fells, Robert M. George Arliss: The Man Who Played God. Scarecrow Press, 2004.
- George C. Tyler and J. C. Furnas. Whatever Goes Up. Bobbs Merrill, 1934.
- Louis N. Parker. Disraeli: A Play. John Lane Company, 1911.
