= Henry Jewett Players =

Former repertory theatre troupe

The Henry Jewett Players (c.1910s–1930s) was a repertory theatre troupe established by actor Henry Jewett in Boston, Massachusetts. The group operated from the Boston Opera House (c.1915); the Toy Theatre and Copley Theatre on Dartmouth Street (c.1916–1924); and the Repertory Theatre on Huntington Avenue (c.1925–1930). Performers included Peg Entwistle and Conway Wingfield. A contemporary critic explained how the players worked: "Mr Jewett ... considers the term 'Stock Company' beneath the just merits and present ambitions of his organization, and insists that it be dignified by the name 'Repertory,' instead. There is justification for this to the extent that no member regularly plays 'leading' parts, but all are moved around in the cast from week to week, from important to minor roles. But the company is nevertheless not run on the European Repertory system by means of which several plays are put on within the week, but instead, follows the usual American fashion of playing each play for a week or more at a time." The Jewett Players continued until around 1930.

== Images ==
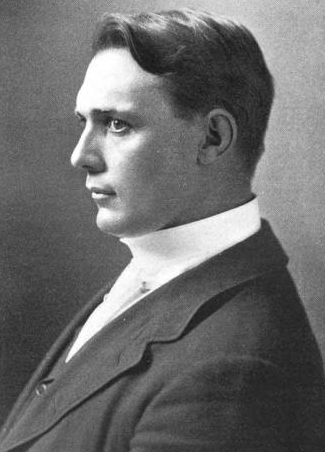
Portrait of Henry Jewett

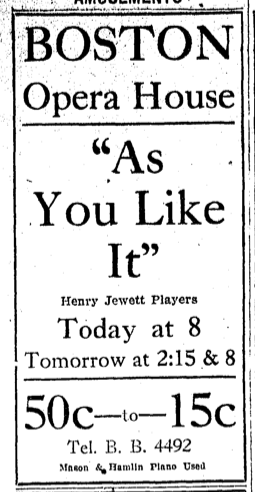
Advertisement, Jewett Players, Boston Opera House, 1915

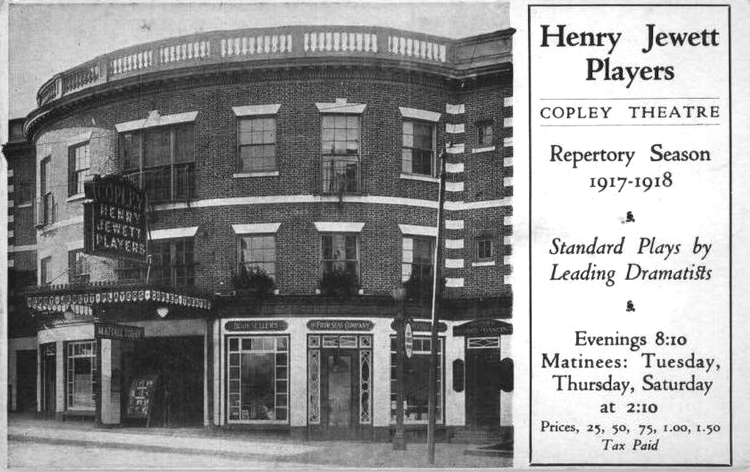
Copley Theatre, Dartmouth St., 1917

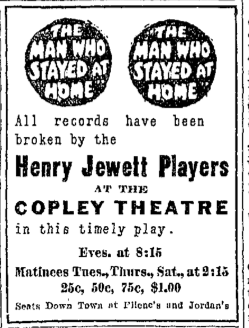
Advertisement, Jewett Players, Copley Theatre, 1917

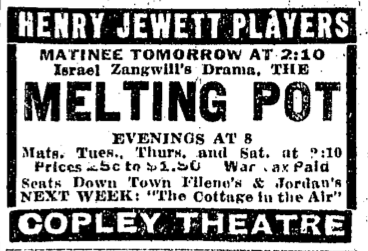
Advertisement, Jewett Players, Copley Theatre, 1918

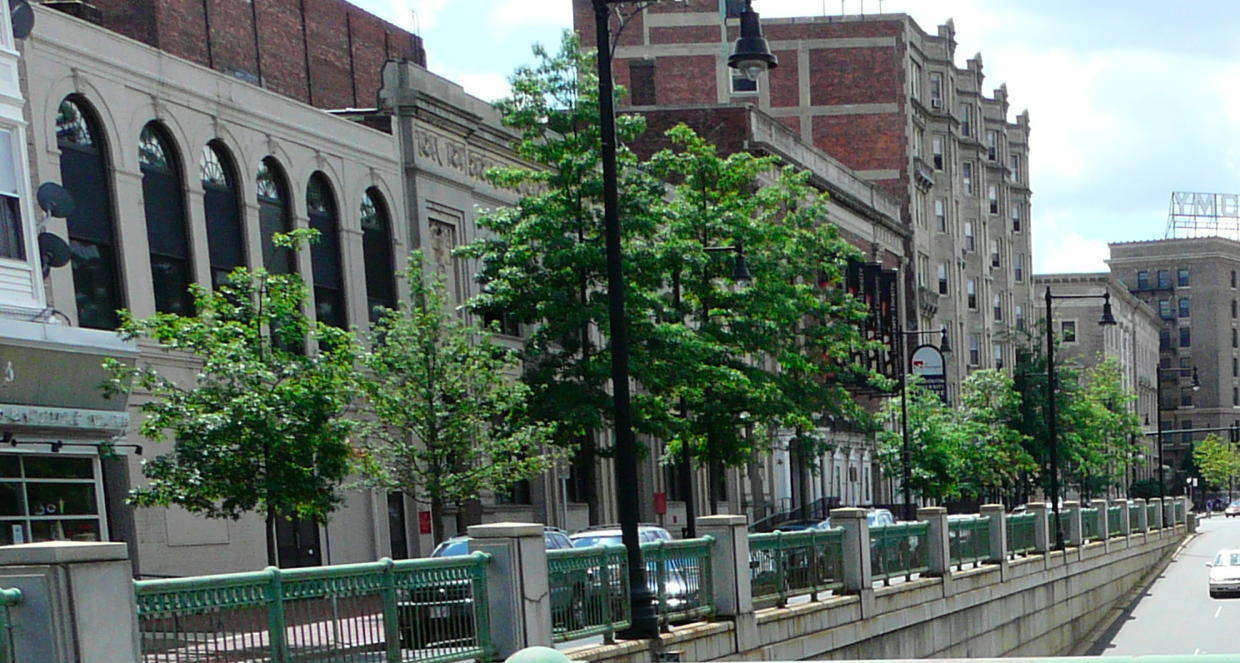
Huntington Theatre, Boston University in 2008; formerly Jewett's Repertory Theatre

== Performances ==
Among the group's productions:

- Ibsen's Pillars of Society
- Dusany's Lost Silk Hat
- Angel in the House
- Inside the Lines
- Pinero's Dandy Dick
- Galsworthy's The Pigeon
- Galsworthy's The Silver Box
- Shaw's plays
- The Rivals a comedy by Richard Sheridan, 1917-1918 season.
- Tom Jones
- Alfred Sutro's Walls of Jericho
- The Doctor's Dilemma
- Graham Moffat's Bunty Pulls the Strings
- Officer 666
- The Private Secretary
- Are you a Mason?
- Charley's Aunt
- Chains
- Hindle Wakes
- Strife
- The Thunderbolt
- Oscar Wilde plays
- J. M. Barrie plays
- H.A. Jones plays
- Granville Barker's The Voysey Inheritance
- St. John Hankin's Cassilis Engagement
- Gregorio Martínez Sierra's Romantic Young Lady

== See also ==
- Huntington Theatre Company, which now resides in the former Repertory Theatre (built in 1925 for the Jewett Players; bought in 1953 by Boston University)
