= Symphony No. 2 (Elgar) =

1911 symphony by Sir Edward Elgar

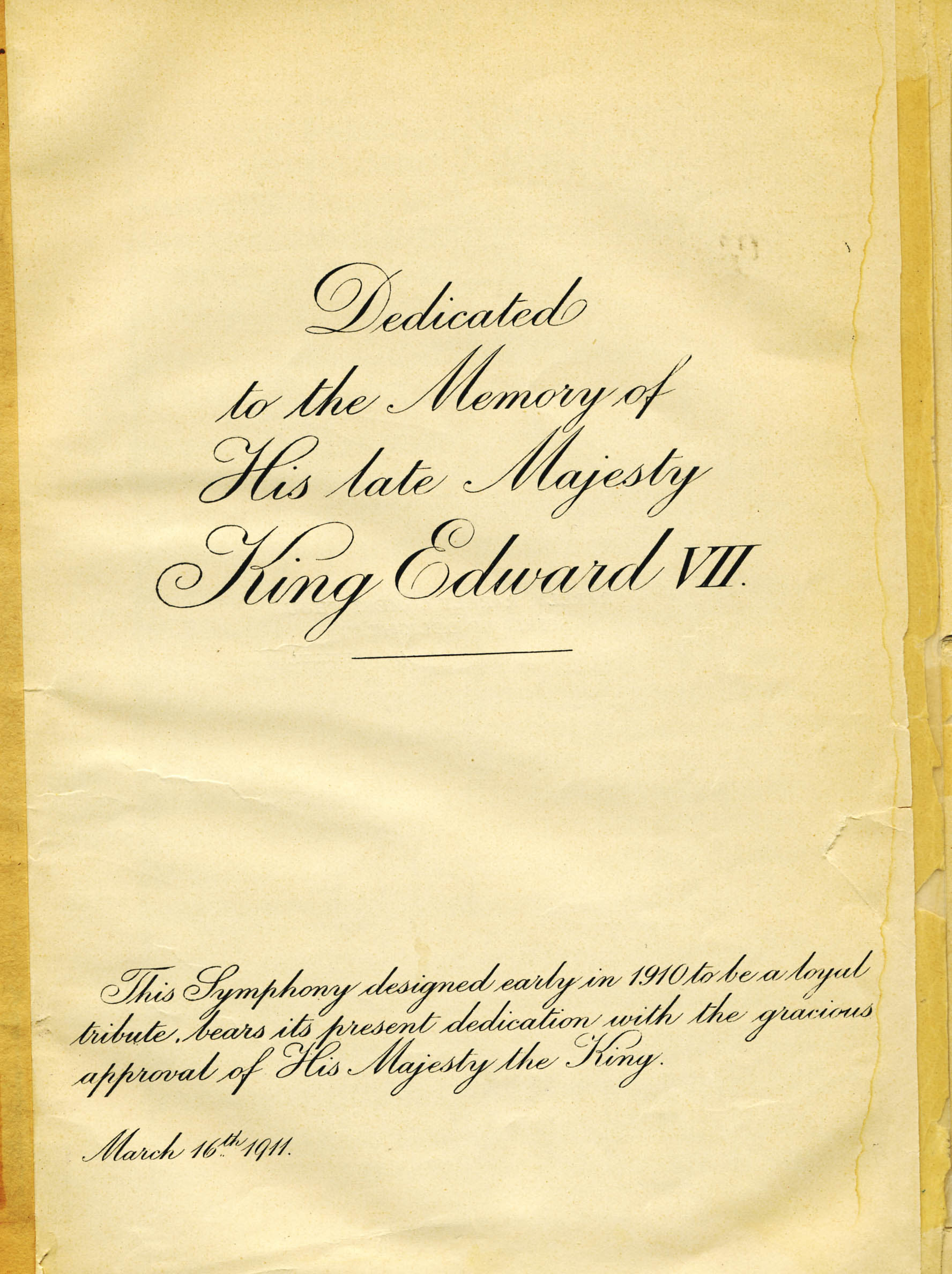
Dedication page to Elgar's Symphony No. 2

Sir Edward Elgar's Symphony No. 2 in E♭ major, Op. 63, was completed on 28 February 1911 and was premiered at the London Musical Festival at the Queen's Hall by the Queen's Hall Orchestra on 24 May 1911 with the composer conducting. The work, which Elgar called "the passionate pilgrimage of the soul", was his last completed symphony; the composition of his Symphony No. 3, begun in 1933, was cut short by his death in 1934.

The dedication reads:

Dedicated to the memory of His late Majesty King Edward VII. This Symphony, designed early in 1910 to be a loyal tribute, bears its present dedication with the gracious approval of His Majesty the King.

The more personal nature of this work, however, is clear in a letter to friend and close correspondent Alice Stuart-Wortley, in which Elgar states:

I have written out my soul in the concerto, Symphony No. 2 and the Ode and you know it ... in these three works I have shewn myself.

== Composition and influences ==
In every movement its form and above all its climax were clearly in Elgar's mind. Indeed, as he has often told me, it is the climax which he invariably settles first. But withal there is a great mass of fluctuating material which might fit into the work as it developed in his mind to finality – for it had been created in the same "oven" which had cast them all. Nothing satisfied him until itself and its context seemed, as he said, inevitable.

These remarks, recounted by Elgar's friend Charles Sanford Terry, shed light on Elgar's creative process. Some sketches of the Symphony No. 2 date back to 1903, a letter from October of that year indicating an idea for a symphony in E♭ major to be dedicated to his friend and conductor Hans Richter. The symphony was set aside during the composition of In the South, Symphony No. 1, and the Violin Concerto. Rejected ideas from the latter work and earlier sketches joined the material Elgar began developing in late 1910 to complete the piece.

The symphony's thematic material, like much of Elgar's work, consists of short, closely interrelated motives which he develops via repetition, sequential techniques, and subtle cross references. Harmonically, the piece often borders on tonal ambiguity, with the composer employing musical devices such as chromaticism and, in the third movement, a whole tone scale in order to heighten the feeling of tonal uncertainty. Elgar also tends to emphasise a tonic-subdominant dichotomy rather than the more typical dominant; examples of this include the C minor Larghetto's second theme in F major, and the A♭ major beginning to the first movement's recapitulation. The repetition of similar rhythm forms an essential part of the structural backbone of the piece, much in the manner of Brahms.

Various large and small scale musical allusions, both obvious and implied, may be found throughout the work. Robert Meikle draws attention to the Mahlerian treatment of the material in the last movement, as well as likenesses to Brahms's A German Requiem. Meikle also notes the similarities to certain aspects of Brahms's Symphony No. 3, in particular the cyclical return of thematic material and the subdued texture which concludes both works. The motive in the first violins at rehearsal 1 of the first movement, reappearing in both the rondo and the finale, resembles both Elgar's own so-called "Judgment" theme from The Dream of Gerontius and the Dies irae. An inverted chord appears at the conclusion of the work, and Allen Gimbel illustrates many possible links between this symphony and Wagner's Die Meistersinger von Nürnberg, a work Elgar admired deeply. Specifically, Gimbel points out the resemblance of the motive on the last three beats of bar 2 of the first movement and the "Abgesang" of Walther's Prize Song from Die Meistersinger, thus linking the trials of the opera's hero to Elgar's desire to assert his independence as an artist.

== Instrumentation ==
The symphony is scored for 3 flutes (1 doubling on piccolo), 2 oboes, English horn, 2 B♭ clarinets, E♭ clarinet, bass clarinet, 2 bassoons, contrabassoon, 4 horns, 3 trumpets, 3 trombones, tuba, timpani, snare drum, bass drum, tambourine, cymbals, 2 harps, and strings.

== Analysis ==
=== I. Allegro vivace e nobilmente ===
The first movement is the longest of the four, running at approximately 17 minutes. The opening contains wide intervals in the strings and upper winds with upward leaps, thus allowing Elgar to create much expression and passion. Elgar himself described this movement as "tremendous in energy".

It opens with what is known as the "Spirit of Delight" theme in E♭ major, which reappears several times throughout the movement. After eight bars, a two-bar theme is introduced, followed by two more two-bar themes. A small bridging passage leads us to the second subject, a wistful tune played by the strings. Elgar was insistent that the first entrance of this new subject be played religiously pianissimo without sacrificing the expression dictated. This subject is formed from the repetition of a two-bar theme through a sequence that builds from pianissimo to fortissimo. This then gives way to a slow, soft cello theme at rehearsal 11, featuring a song-like character. Throughout this section, the violas play a subtle accompaniment figure consisting of a quarter note moving up Diatonic and chromatically to an eighth note. This figure seems unimportant; however, it later goes on to become a major part of the heroic episode at rehearsal 20, interspersed with a trumpet call which bursts through triumphantly. The manipulation of these short motives serve as the basis of Elgar's composition in this movement. The brevity of this thematic material does not leave the listener feeling exhausted, as Elgar ties them up by closely relating each, resulting in a lengthy flowing development at rehearsal 24.

The opening melody of the development is made up of eerie diatonic and chromatic scales and is rather ambiguous, culminating in the appearance of what Elgar called the "ghost" motive in the violins at rehearsal 24. A clearer and more grounded tune appears later in the cellos, commanding this section until the transformation into what appears to be a super-development. Elgar quickly thickens out the score and fills it with punctuating accents and six bars of downward leaps into the main theme, thus beginning the transition back into the primary material. This bridging section contains a break after the first bar of rehearsal 42 which gives the audience a chance to catch its breath before plunging into the recapitulation, which follows the standard outline. Following is a coda section at rehearsal 61, which introduces a short, calm section before uprooting the music with a surge of excitement and closing with a virtuosic ending.

=== II. Larghetto ===
The second movement of the Symphony is a Larghetto funeral march in C minor. It has become popular belief that this movement is an elegy to Edward VII, after whose death it was written. Many, including Michael Kennedy, hold the belief that it is also a more personal expression of Elgar's grief, as he had lost close friends August Johannes Jaeger and Alfred Edward Rodewald around the time he was working on the symphony.

The movement is in sonata form without a development and is characterised by its manipulation of modal expectations. It opens with a seven-bar C minor introduction of soft chords in the strings, grouped into a 3+3+1 bar pattern which contrasts with the clear 4+4 grouping of the main theme's funeral march. The march tread of the movement is suggested beginning at bar 8 by a series of throbbing chords on beats two and four, pulsing in the string and drum accompaniment under the grave winds and brass melody. An unexpected welling of emotion is heard just before the March section closes at rehearsal 70, followed by a transitory passage featuring a "sigh" motive (rehearsal 70) in the woodwinds. This transition modulates to the second theme in F minor opens with a lyrical but subdued string episode at 71. Then, as if Elgar had lost his sense of restraint, we hear a build-up of dynamic, an increase in tempo, and more imaginative scoring leading to a triumphant F major climax in the brass, marked "Nobilmente e semplice" (rehearsal 76). The "sigh" figure is again heard in the closing thematic area at rehearsal 78, as if to recall earlier grief, slowly melting into the recapitulation of the C minor March theme at rehearsal 79.

The primary theme is now heard against a new countersubject in the oboe, resembling a solo lament of which Elgar, conducting, said:

I want you to imagine a great crowd of silent people, watching the passing of a beloved sovereign. Strings, you must play those semiquaver figures of yours like the sigh of an immense crowd ... Oboe, I want you to play your lament entirely free, with all the expression you can get into it ...It must sound as if it belonged outside somewhere.

The lyrical string second theme follows immediately at rehearsal 81 without a transition, this time in E♭ major, the key of the "Spirit of Delight" theme. Everything follows according to sonata form convention until the coda (three bars after rehearsal 88), an extended V chord resolving to a warm and mournful return to C minor at rehearsal 89. An allusion to the introduction is then interrupted by an unexpected crescendo in the trombones and strings, quickly silenced as the movement ends with a decrescendo to ppp.

=== III. Rondo ===
The third movement is the shortest of the four, running 8 to 9 minutes. Labelled a rondo by Elgar, it by no means adheres to the typical rondo archetype; Robert Meikle successfully analysed the movement's structure according to several different forms: two different rondos (the first ABACABA, the second ABACADABACA), a scherzo and trio, and a sonata form.

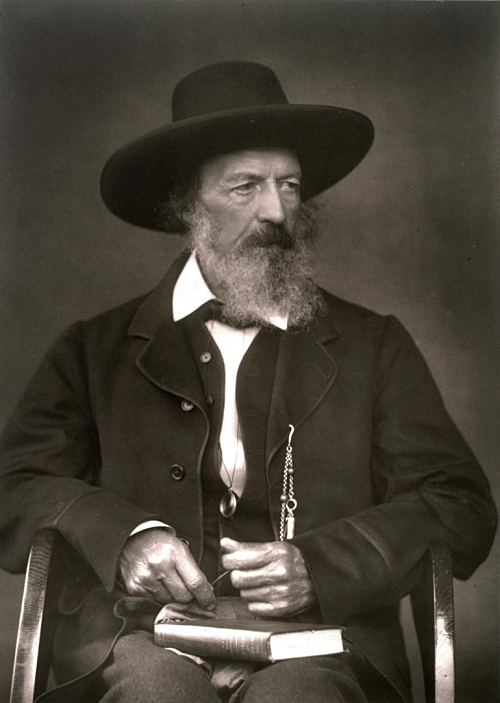
Alfred, Lord Tennyson

The opening theme in C major is derived from a motif heard initially in the first movement (at rehearsal 1). Featuring a recurring two sixteenth–eighth note rhythm and a sprightly character, it is traded between strings and woodwinds in quick successive units, maintaining a sense of rhythmic unrest through offbeat accompaniment patterns and hemiolas. A second sweeping theme in C minor begins at rehearsal 93, similar in contour and rhythm to the first movement motive mentioned above. Marked fortissimo and sonoramente in the strings, it is occasionally supplemented by winds and horns and punctuated by accented off-beats in the brass and timpani. This theme is then repeated piano by the first violins with interjecting woodwind solos. The opening material returns in fragments, running through a series of harmonic sequences and building to the entrance of the third theme at rehearsal 100, which maintains the sweeping aspects of the C minor section with the added rhythmic punch of the opening. This is followed by a return to the opening thematic material in earnest.

A pastoral theme appears at rehearsal 106 in the woodwinds, oscillating between a string motive related to the C minor theme and the opening material. Throughout this section, the timpani subtly foreshadows the coming strife with a repeated eighth note pattern played softly in the background. This action begins to intensify at rehearsal 118, with the return of the "ghost" motive from the first movement and the hammering of eighth notes in timpani, brass, high winds, and tambourine. It is a striking moment, a violent outburst in the midst of relative serenity; Elgar stated that it represented "the madness that attends the excess or abuse of passion", and tied it to a section of a Tennyson poem related to a corpse's experience in his grave ("...the hoofs of the horses beat, beat into my scalp and brain..."). The episode passes seemingly unnoticed, fading away before the recapitulation of earlier material, concluding with a triumphant C major cadence.

=== IV. Moderato e maestoso ===
The fourth movement of the symphony, marked Moderato e maestoso, is in a clear sonata form. The exposition opens with a primary theme in E♭ major; every bar has the same rhythmic pattern and the last beat of each bar ends with a downwards leap of a perfect fifth. An aggressive transitional theme at rehearsal 139 leads, through sequences, to a grandioso climax (four bars before rehearsal 142), followed by a new theme in the dominant (B♭ major) at 142, marked Nobilmente like the climactic section of the second movement.

In large part, the development, beginning at 145, is a fugato based on the transitional theme described above. It modulates very little, centring essentially around D major and B minor, calls for extreme orchestral virtuosity, and features very complex scoring. The climax of the section arrives at rehearsal 149 when the brass and percussion play a bar evoking the main theme and the trumpet hits a high B that rings out over the entire orchestra. The score calls for a B lasting only one bar, but, on one occasion, the trumpeter Ernest Hall held the note for two full bars. Elgar was so delighted that it has since become tradition to hold the B for the two bars.

At the end of the development, new lyrical melodic material leads to a return of the main theme and a modulation back to E♭ major. Thus, the recapitulation follows in fairly standard fashion at rehearsal 157; it brings back the same themes and firmly establishes E♭ major.

The coda at rehearsal 167, marked più tranquillo, again puts the main theme of the movement in the cellos and brings back the "Spirit of Delight" motive from the first movement, now heard in the woodwinds at a slower tempo at rehearsal 168.

The movement ends peacefully, and Elgar, who had premiered his First Symphony and his Violin Concerto to "endless ovations", is said to have been disappointed by the less generous reception of the Second Symphony. This could be in part because a quiet ending did not stir the audience into a wild show of appreciation but rather a more contemplative one, and in fact, the Daily Mail gave it a warm review, stating, "the symphony was received with unhesitating and most cordial warmth".

== Extra-musical considerations ==
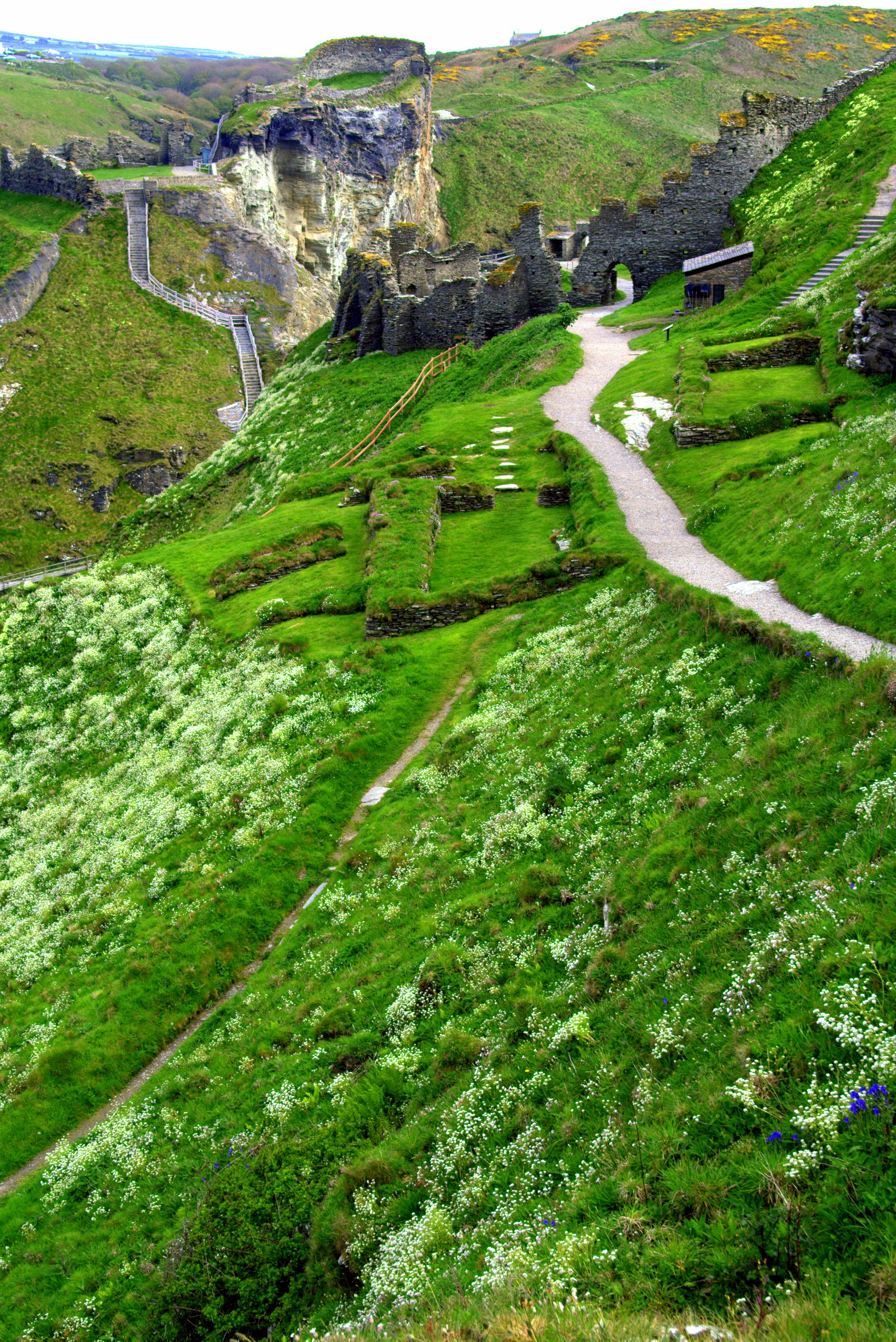
The ruins of Tintagel, Cornwall, UK

There is much speculation as to who inspired Elgar to write this symphony. It was officially dedicated to Edward VII, who died in May 1910, but many scholars nonetheless believe his close friend Alice Stuart Wortley, with whom he was rumoured to have a romantic liaison, served as inspiration. Others tie the work to Elgar's grief over the death of his close friend Alfred E. Rodewald in 1903, as shortly thereafter, Elgar started sketching the Larghetto movement of the symphony.

Elgar told close friends that the symphony represented everything that had happened to him from April 1909 to February 1911, from the people he was with and the places he visited. During this time, Elgar visited Venice where he admired St. Mark's Basilica and its square, which, he later explained, inspired the opening of the Larghetto movement. Later in this period, he visited Tintagel in Cornwall in the southwest of England, spending time with Alice Stuart Wortley and her husband Charles. His friendship with Alice strengthened over the course of their many walks; Alice's daughter Clare later recalled one such stroll in the evening sun, the lyrical beauty of the countryside and the coastline engaging Elgar's interest. These events explain the words "Venice and Tintagel" inscribed at the bottom of Elgar's score.

Another known inspiration for the piece is the poem "Song" by Percy Bysshe Shelley, one of the last poems published before his death in 1822:

Rarely, rarely, comest thou, Spirit of Delight!
Wherefore hast thou left me now
Many a day and night?
Many a weary night and day
'Tis since thou art fled away.

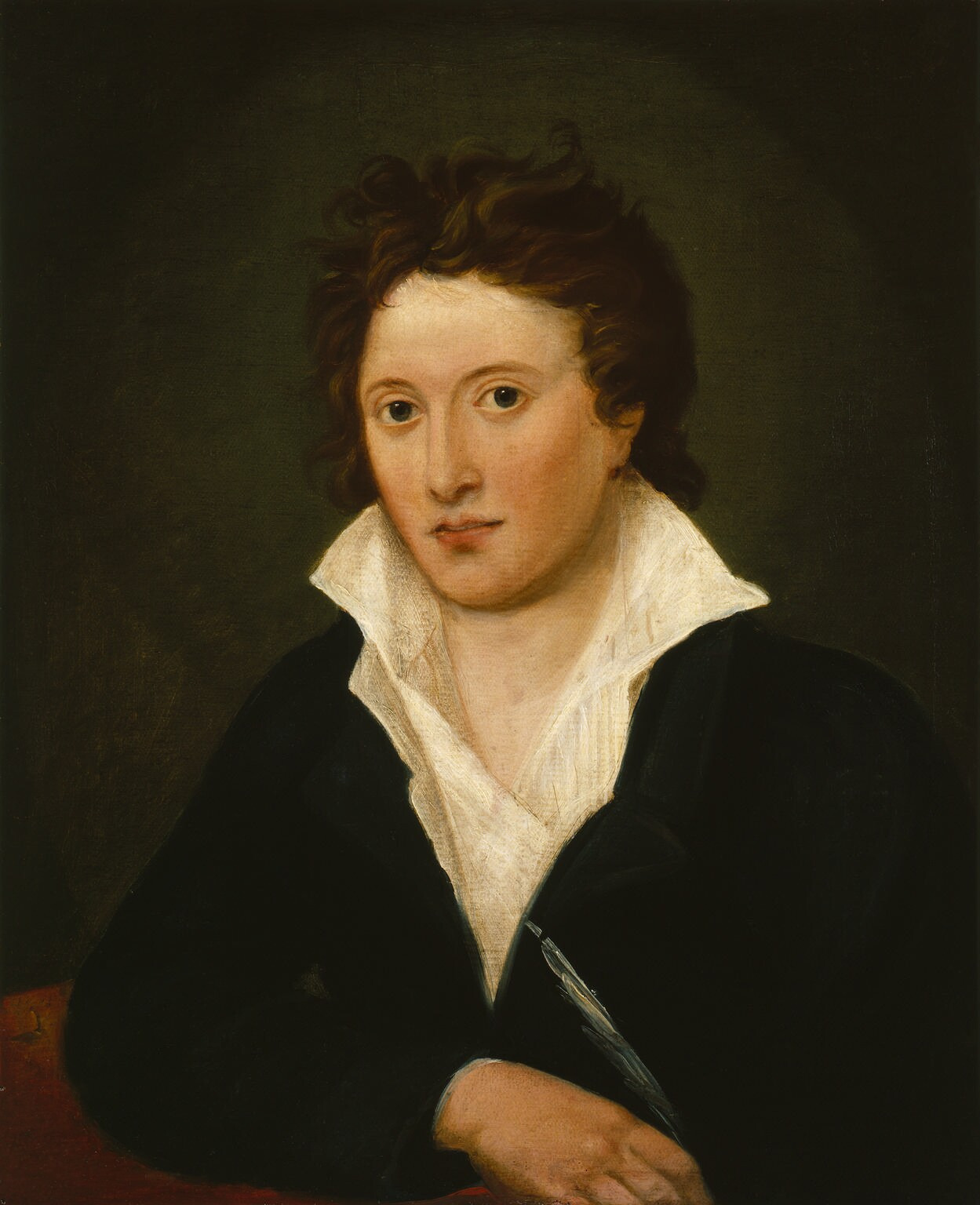
Percy Bysshe Shelley

The first line of this first stanza is written on the score, at the bottom of the first page. Elgar said, "To get near the mood of the symphony the whole of Shelley's poem may be read, but the music does not illustrate the whole of the poem, neither does the poem entirely elucidate the music."

Scholars speculate about the "Windflower" influence on this symphony, "Windflower" the affectionate nickname, inspired by Elgar's favourite buttercup flower, given to Alice Stuart Wortley by the composer. That Elgar and Alice were close friends is beyond question; the two kept in regular, frequent contact for several years. By virtue of Elgar's letters (the only side of their correspondence which survives), some suggest the composer harboured romantic feelings for the talented pianist and, furthermore, that his feelings may have been reciprocated. Concrete evidence of such a relationship, however, does not exist; Alice and Charles Stuart Wortley were well-known music lovers, and several members of both the Elgar and Stuart Wortley families maintained close ties through visits and letters. Alice spent much time with Elgar during his visit to Tintagel, and Elgar clearly admired her; however, whether he thought of her as anything more than a friend and confidante is unknown. She may have served as some form of muse for the composer as he drew upon his time in Tintagel whilst writing his second symphony.

== Early reception ==
Elgar, though always prone to spells of intense self-doubt, had come to expect positive reactions to his new works. The premiere of Symphony No. 1 in 1908 was received enthusiastically by an exuberant audience and press; Elgar's name was linked with the likes of Beethoven and Brahms, and the work was performed 82 times over the following year. Thus, Elgar was unpleasantly surprised by the very different reception given the premiere of his Symphony No. 2. The less-than-capacity filled hall responded to the new symphony, according to The Times reviewer, "with much favour, though with rather less enthusiasm than usual."

Reasons for this perceived waning of interest could include the performance of The Dream of Gerontius and the Violin Concerto earlier the same week, the presence of two other composer-conductor premieres on the programme, or the high ticket prices. The emotional disconnect between an audience eager for the coronation of a new monarch and a brooding symphony in mournful commemoration of the late king may have also affected the reaction. Regardless, the lukewarm response prompted Elgar to remark to Henry Wood immediately upon exiting the stage, "Henry, they don't like it, they don't like it", and complain to W. H. Reed shortly thereafter, "they sit there like a lot of stuffed pigs." In the aftermath of the symphony's premiere, Elgar was "despondent" and subsequently entered "one of his periods of despair."

The reviews from that first performance were, however, generally positive. The critic of The Daily Telegraph lauded Elgar's "firmer grip, not only of the symphonic form, but of the substance expressed within its confines." This reviewer would also attest "there are heights here that hitherto even Elgar himself had not touched, but we are doubtful if the greater public will realise the fact immediately." The critic of The Times acclaimed the work as "a great deal better than his first", remarking that the second and fourth movements in particular "touch the composer's highest mark."

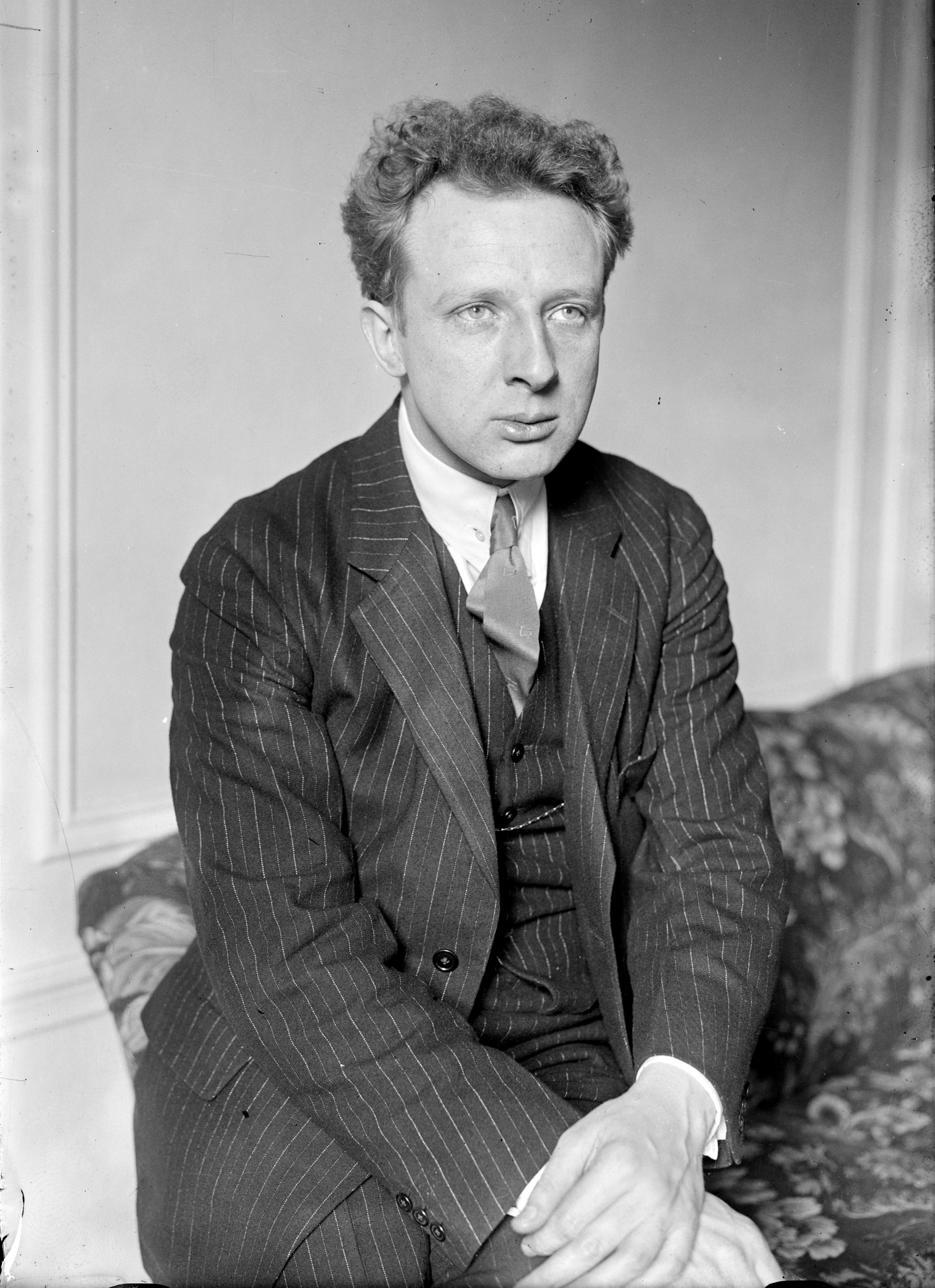
Leopold Stokowski

Reviews in the following year, however, were decidedly mixed. Elgar conducted the Hallé Orchestra in a performance on 23 November 1911 eliciting the critic of The Manchester Guardian to declare "Elgar's original charm and his power of surprising us into wonder have diminished rather than grown as his craftsmanship and subtlety of fantastic variation have increased ... we can hardly say that the work contains any melody in the full sense of the word. Neither can we say with confidence that it quite vanquishes the impression of coldness and hardness." The American premiere in Cincinnati on 24 and 25 November by the Cincinnati Symphony Orchestra under Leopold Stokowski was not well received, and the American correspondent of The Times had this to say of a New York performance on 16 December: "One cannot listen to even the most eloquent pleading for nearly an hour without fatigue, and that was the first impression this music made – of restless, unpitying earnestness...not only is no concession made to the sensuously pleasing, but little regard is paid to the psychological need for contrast, for relief. It is a devotee exhorting a congregation assumed also to be devotees."

The symphony was slow to catch on, not performed a second time by the Hallé Orchestra, generally very supportive of Elgar's music, until 1926. The Royal Philharmonic Society performed the work in 1916 and not again until seven years later. In the wake of World War I, it did begin to stake its place in the repertoire. A concert in March 1924, inspired the Times critic to remark upon the second movement: "one wondered whether any nobler or more beautiful funeral music has been written than this, which unrolls like some vast tapestry richly woven of purple and crimson threads." Adrian Boult's rendering of the piece with the London Symphony Orchestra on 16 March 1920 was received with "frantic enthusiasm," and stirred Elgar to declare, "I feel that my reputation in the future is safe in your hands."

== Recordings ==
The symphony was first recorded complete in 1927 by His Master's Voice, part of the EMI group, conducted by the composer. This recording was later reissued on LP and later on CD. There was no further recording for eighteen years, until Sir Adrian Boult and the BBC Symphony Orchestra made a recordings of the symphony in 1944. Since then there have been more than twenty-four new recordings. All the studio recordings of the symphony were made in the UK, until Sakari Oramo recorded the symphony with the Royal Stockholm Philharmonic Orchestra for BIS in 2011. The non-British conductors who have recorded the work in the studio (they include Sir Georg Solti, Giuseppe Sinopoli, Bernard Haitink, André Previn, Daniel Barenboim and Leonard Slatkin) have all done so with one of the London orchestras. Live performances from Russia and Australia have been recorded for CD, conducted by Yevgeny Svetlanov and Vladimir Ashkenazy respectively. Kirill Petrenko conducted the work in his first concert with the Berlin Philharmonic Orchestra in 2009.

Of the British conductors, Boult recorded the work five times, Sir John Barbirolli and Sir Andrew Davis have each made two recordings, while the London Philharmonic has played on seven recordings.

BBC Radio 3's "Building a Library" feature has broadcast comparative reviews of all available recordings of the symphony on three occasions since the 1980s. The Penguin Guide to Recorded Classical Music, 2008, carries three pages of reviews of recordings of the work. The recordings given the top recommendation by both the BBC and The 'Penguin Guide are the 1975 Decca version by Solti and the London Philharmonic, coupled with the First Symphony, and the 1981 EMI recording by Vernon Handley with the same orchestra.

== Sources ==
- Elgar, Edward (1911), Symphony No. 2 in E-flat, London: Novello
- Gimbel, Allen (Spring 1989). "Elgar's Prize Song: Quotation and Allusion in the Second Symphony". 19th-Century Music. 12 (3): 231–240. doi:10.2307/746504. JSTOR 746504.
- Harper-Scott, J. P. E. (2007). "Elgar's deconstruction of the belle époque: interlace structures and the Second Symphony". In J. P. E. Harper-Scott; Julian Rushton (eds.). Elgar Studies. Cambridge: Cambridge University Press. ISBN 978-0-521-86199-1.
- Kennedy, Michael. Portrait of Elgar. New York: Oxford University Press, 1987. ISBN 978-0-19-284017-2.
- Kennedy, Michael. "Symphony No. 2 in E-flat major, Op. 63." In Elgar Orchestral Music, 57–64. Seattle: University of Washington Press, 1970.
- Kent, Christopher. "A View of Elgar's Methods of Composition through the Sketches of the Symphony No. 2 in Eb (Op. 63)." Proceedings of the Royal Musical Association 103 (1976–1977): pp 41–60
- Lace, Ian (n.d.). "Elgar – His Music: Symphony No. 2, Extended Description". Elgar Society..
- March, Ivan (ed). The Penguin Guide to Recorded Classical Music, Penguin Books, London, 2007. ISBN 978-0-14-103336-5
- Mark, Christopher. "The Later Orchestral Music." In The Cambridge Companion to Elgar, edited by Daniel Grimley and Julian Rushton, 154–170. Cambridge: Cambridge University Press, 2004. ISBN 978-0-521-53363-8.
- McNaught, W. "A Note on Elgar's Second Symphony." The Musical Times 92, No. 1296 (Feb 1951), pp. 57–61.
- Meikle, Robert. "'The True Foundation': The Symphonies." In Edward Elgar: Music and Literature, edited by Raymond Monk, 45–71. Aldershot, Hants, England: Scolar Press, 1993. ISBN 978-0-85967-937-4.
- Newman, Ernest. "Elgar's Second Symphony." The Musical Times 52, No. 819 (May 1911): pp. 295–300.
- Redwood, Christopher, ed. An Elgar Companion. Derbyshire, England: Sequoia Publishing, 1982.
- Shelley, Percy Bysshe. "Song." Columbia Granger's Poetry Database. EBSCOhost. subscription access. Retrieved 29 April 2009.
- Shore, Bernard (1949). Sixteen Symphonies. London: Longmans, Green and Co.
- Tovey, Donald F. (1936). Essays in Musical Analysis. Vol. Two. London: Oxford University Press.
