= The Wand of Youth =

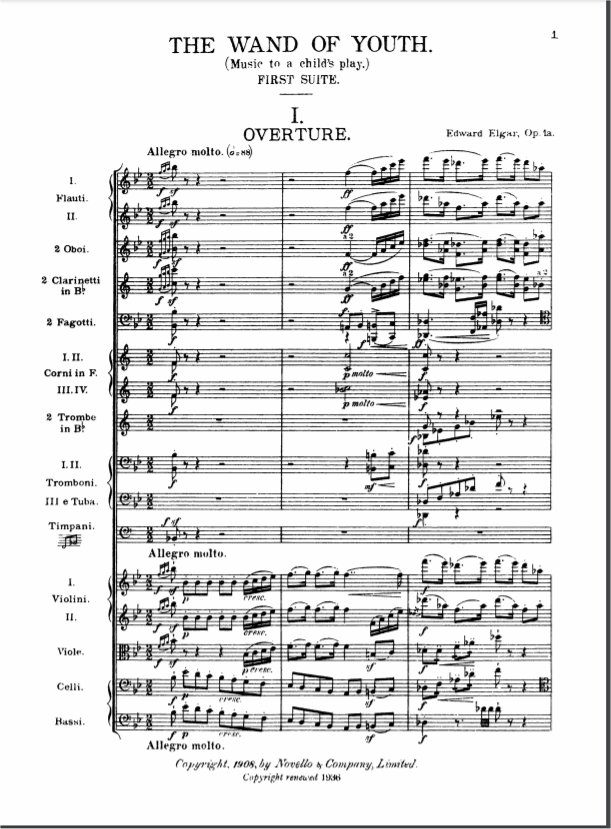
First page of Suite No. 1

The Wand of Youth Suites No. 1 and No. 2 are works for orchestra by Edward Elgar, first performed in 1907 and 1908 respectively. The titles Elgar gave them were, in full: The Wand of Youth (Music to a Child's Play) First Suite, Op. 1a (1869–1907) and The Wand of Youth (Music to a Child's Play) Second Suite, (Op. 1b). The music was drawn from material written by the composer in his youth and orchestrated forty years or so later.

== History ==
Elgar wrote a programme note for Fred Gaisberg of His Master's Voice in connection with a recording of the suites in 1929. He explained that they were drawn from music he had written as a boy for family theatricals. The note opened:

Some small grievances occasioned by the imaginary despotic rule of my father and mother (The Two Old People) led to the devising of The Wand of Youth. By means of a stage-allegory – which was never completed – it was proposed to shew that children were not properly understood. The scene was a "Woodland Glade", intersected by a brook; the hither side of this was our fairyland; beyond, small and distant, was the ordinary life which we forgot as often as possible. The characters on crossing the stream entered fairyland and were transfigured.

Throughout his life Elgar kept musical sketchbooks in which he jotted down musical ideas as they came to him, to be drawn on as wanted in future compositions. His early sketchbooks, which date back to 1867, show that in addition to the music composed for the family play, some was originally intended for chamber music, or wind quintet or the Powick Asylum dance music he wrote as a young man for the Worcester City and County Lunatic Asylum.

At around the time of his fiftieth birthday, with several successes to his credit but struggling to write a symphony and frustrated at his temporary failure of inspiration, Elgar turned to his early sketchbooks. The first Wand of Youth suite was not written to commission but at the composer's own instigation. The suite remained untitled during its composition and Elgar called it The Wand of Youth only after it was complete; it is not known why he chose that title. He gave the suites the opus numbers 1a and 1b (Note: Elgar had already given the opus number 1 to his Romance for violin and piano, written in the late 1870s and published in 1885.) in recognition that they were his earliest surviving compositions, albeit rescored for full orchestra. (Note: Many years later Benjamin Britten followed Elgar’s precedent using his own juvenilia as the basis of his Simple Symphony.)

The two suites were published by Novello, the first in late 1907 and the second in 1908.

== First Suite ==
The Wand of Youth (Music to a Child's Play) First Suite, Op. 1a (1869–1907) is dedicated "To my friend C. Lee Williams". (Note: Charles Lee Williams was a former organist of Gloucester Cathedral and conductor of the Three Choirs Festival.) It is scored for 2 flutes (one doubling piccolo, 2 oboes, 2 clarinets in B♭ & A, 2 bassoons, 4 horns in F, 2 trumpets in B♭, C & A, 3 trombones, tuba, timpani (3), 2 percussionists (with bass drum & cymbals, triangle & snare drum), harp and string section. Not all these instruments are played in all sections.

The suite was first performed at the Queen's Hall, London on 14 December 1907, conducted by Henry Wood. It consists of seven sections:

=== 1. Overture ===
Elgar reworked this movement from sketches dating back to 1879. The opening theme is extrovert and fast moving, marked allegro molto in 2/2 in the key of B♭. The second theme, marked largamente, with characteristic Elgarian falling sevenths, is more expansive. The Elgar scholar Michael Kennedy finds in the second theme hints of the first subject of Elgar's Violin Concerto.

=== 2. Serenade ===
The Serenade (andantino) in F is a gently lilting movement with an initial clarinet melody later taken over by the violins and then alternated between strings and woodwinds.

=== 3. Minuet (Old Style) ===
The Minuet, in G major, is a 17th-century pastiche originally dating (in short score) from 1881. Marked andante in 3/4, the opening bars have the annotation "The two old people enter". Kennedy calls the movement "an affectionate tribute to Handel" with nothing of Haydn or Mozart in it. Reviewing the first performance, The Times commented, "It may be doubted whether the mature composer would have given the name of 'Minuet' to a movement that is unmistakably in the sarabande form".

=== 4. Sun Dance ===
The movement is in C major, in presto 3/4 time. The music dates from 1878. The order of the music in the two suites does not follow that of the action in the unstaged play. The Sun Dance depicts the two old people being awakened (by glittering lights flashed in their eyes by means of hand-mirrors) from the sleep into which they have been charmed in the Slumber Scene, which in the suite follows two movements later. Kennedy compares it with the "Dorabella" section of the Enigma Variations: "stylish and fluent woodwind writing". It has a central waltz section and virtuoso music for the harp towards the end. Elgar reused this movement for his later score for The Starlight Express.

=== 5. Fairy Pipers ===
The marking is G major, 6/8, allegretto. Elgar annotated the opening bars, "Two fairy pipers pass by in a boat, and charm them to sleep". Two clarinets in thirds play a gentle melody over a rocking string accompaniment. The strings then have a theme which Kennedy finds "yearning" and comparable to "the rarefied atmosphere of the introduction to Part II of Gerontius".

=== 6. Slumber Scene ===
The movement is in G major, 4/4, moderato, for muted strings with two bassoons and a single horn. The double bass line uses only the open strings: Elgar noted, "the simplicity of the bass made it possible for a child who knew nothing of music on any instrument to grind out the bass". Diana McVeagh comments that Elgar's harmonic shifts over the bass are "a tour de force, the soporific rhythm soothing, never monotonous".

=== 7. Fairies and Giants ===
The final movement of the suite is in D major, marked presto in 4/4 time. The music portraying the fairies (the children) is in a tarantella rhythm, while that for the giants (the adults) has brass and bassoons with unison strings in heavy detached crotchets. The main theme dates back to a work entitled Humoreske which the young Elgar wrote in 1867, and is the earliest of his music known to exist.

== Second Suite ==
The Wand of Youth (Music to a Child's Play) Second Suite, (Op. 1b) – is dedicated to Hubert A. Leicester. (Note: Hubert Leicester was a boyhood friend of the composer, who played the clarinet in Elgar's wind quintet while young Edward played the bassoon and cello.) It is scored for 2 flutes (second doubling piccolo), 2 oboes, 2 clarinets in B♭ & A, 2 bassoons, 4 horns in F, 2 trumpets in B♭, 3 trombones, tuba, timpani (3), 3 percussionists (with tambourine, bass drum & cymbals, side drum, bell in E♭ & triangle), harp and string section. Not all these instruments are played in all sections.

The suite was first performed at Worcester (as part of the Three Choirs Festival) on 9 September 1908, conducted by the composer. There are six movements:

=== 1. March ===
The opening of the march is variously described by musical analysts as "tense and hesitant", having "an air of pensive expectancy", and "in sombre mood ... in the key of E♭ in 4/4 with much use of triplet rhythms". The trio section, in G major, gives the strings a jaunty, skipping rhythm. Elgar's 1929 programme note records that the march was composed to conclude the family play.

=== 2. The Little Bells (Scherzino) ===
Like the first movement of the suite, the second has two contrasting sections. The opening allegro molto, in E♭, has a prominent part for the glockenspiel. The slower middle section has a wistful theme, using a five note falling phrase in the melodic minor.

=== 3. Moths and Butterflies (Dance) ===
The movement, marked allegretto, is in C major, in 2/4 time. In the planned play the delicate flutterings of the moths and butterflies draw the two old people across the bridge to Fairyland. Kennedy compares the music to that of a Tchaikovsky ballet.

=== 4. Fountain Dance ===
The G major Fountain Dance, marked allegretto comodo, is in 3/8 time. The music depicts gracefully rising and falling jets of water, the lower strings and timpani forming a drone bass. According to the composer's programme note, in the planned play "the water was induced to follow the music by means of the interior economy of a football".

=== 5. The Tame Bear ===
In 2/2 time, the C major movement is marked allegro moderato. The music depicts a tame bear dancing to a tambourine. Kennedy writes that the poignant mood of the movement is marked by the use of plagal cadences. Elgar's wife commented that the music showed the composer's sympathy with "the poor bear – captive, made to dance".

=== 6. The Wild Bears ===
The final movement, in C major, is marked presto, in 2/4 time. The original thematic material comes from Elgar's sketchbooks from the time of the family play, and was reused for one of a set of five Powick quadrilles entitled L'Assomoir (1879). Kennedy calls the movement "a romp, which is also one of Elgar's most exotic pieces of orchestration".

== Recordings ==
There are complete recordings made from 1929 to the 21st century. In the era of the LP record a full Suite (each lasting around 20 minutes) fitted conveniently on one side of a disc. The suites have continued to be recorded for CD, often in tandem with other shorter pieces by Elgar such as the Nursery Suite.

Orchestra	Conductor	Issued
London Symphony	Sir Edward Elgar	1929
Liverpool Philharmonic	Sir Malcolm Sargent	1949 (Note: First suite only)
London Philharmonic	Sir Adrian Boult	1954
London Philharmonic	Eduard van Beinum	1955
London Philharmonic	Sir Adrian Boult	1968
Ulster Orchestra	Bryden Thomson	1984
English String Orchestra	William Boughton	1988
Royal Liverpool Philharmonic	Vernon Handley	1989
Indianapolis Symphony	Raymond Leppard	1991
Welsh National Opera	Sir Charles Mackerras	1992
Academy of Saint Martin in the Fields	Sir Neville Marriner	1994
New Zealand Symphony	James Judd	2004
Hallé	Sir Mark Elder	2018

== Ballet ==
In 1985 Sadler's Wells Royal Ballet staged a new ballet by Michael Corder, The Wand of Youth. The music was mainly from the first of the two Elgar suites, with two movements from the second and one from the Nursery Suite. The main characters are two young people and their friends, seen first in tranquillity in the Edwardian era in which Elgar's two suites were premiered, and later in the carnage of the First World War. The men are all killed, and the women are left on their own to age with their memories.

== Notes, references and sources ==
=== Sources ===
- Adams, Byron, ed. (2007). Edward Elgar and His World. Princeton and Oxford: Princeton University Press. ISBN 978-0-691-13445-1.
- Craggs, Stewart (1995). Edward Elgar: A Source Book. Aldershot: Scolar Press. ISBN 978-0-85-967920-6.
- Elgar, Edward (1936) [1908]. The Wand of Youth: First Suite (PDF). London: Novello. OCLC 1223590596.
- Elgar, Edward (1936) [1908]. The Wand of Youth: Second Suite (PDF). London: Novello. OCLC 2881377.
- Kennedy, Michael (1970). Elgar: Orchestral Music. London: BBC. ISBN 978-0-56-310150-5.
- March, Ivan, ed. (1977) [1975]. Penguin Stereo Record Guide (second ed.). London: Penguin. ISBN 978-0-14-046223-4.
- McVeagh, Diana (2011). "Elgar's musical language: the shorter instrumental works". In Grimley, Daniel; Julian Rushton (eds.). The Cambridge Companion to Elgar. Cambridge: Cambridge University Press. ISBN 978-1-13-900225-7.
- Moore, Jerrold Northrop (1974). Elgar On Record: The Composer and the Gramophone. London and New York: Oxford University Press. ISBN 978-0-19-315434-6.
- Moore, Jerrold Northrop (1999) [1984]. Edward Elgar: a Creative Life (second ed.). Oxford: Oxford University Press. ISBN 978-0-19-816366-4.
- Willetts, Pamela (Spring 1985). "The Elgar Sketch-Books". The British Library Journal. 11 (1): 25–45. JSTOR 42554212. (subscription required)
