= Violin Concerto (Elgar) =

1910 concerto composed by Edward Elgar

Elgar in 1917

Edward Elgar's Violin Concerto in B minor, Op. 61, is one of his longest orchestral compositions, and the last of his works to gain immediate popular success.

The concerto was composed for the violinist Fritz Kreisler, who gave the premiere in London in 1910, with the composer conducting. Plans by the Gramophone Company to record the work with Kreisler and Elgar fell through, and the composer made a recording with the teenaged Yehudi Menuhin that has remained in the catalogues since its first release in 1932.

Even though Elgar's music fell out of fashion in the middle of the twentieth century, and the concerto's reputation as one of the most difficult in the violin repertoire grew (because of its use of constant multiple-stopping, fast and unorthodox string crossings, and rapid shifting around the instrument), it nevertheless continued to be programmed and played by acclaimed violinists. By the end of the 20th century, when Elgar's music was restored to the general repertoire, there had been more than twenty recordings of the concerto. In 2010, centenary performances of the concerto were given around the world.

== History ==
Elgar had begun work on a violin concerto in 1890, but he was dissatisfied with it and destroyed the manuscript. In 1907 the violinist Fritz Kreisler, who admired Elgar's The Dream of Gerontius, asked him to write a violin concerto. Two years earlier, Kreisler had told an English newspaper:

If you want to know whom I consider to be the greatest living composer, I say without hesitation Elgar... I say this to please no one; it is my own conviction... I place him on an equal footing with my idols, Beethoven and Brahms. He is of the same aristocratic family. His invention, his orchestration, his harmony, his grandeur, it is wonderful. And it is all pure, unaffected music. I wish Elgar would write something for the violin.

The Royal Philharmonic Society of London formally commissioned the concerto in 1909. Elgar, despite himself being a violinist, called upon W. H. "Billy" Reed, leader of the London Symphony Orchestra, for technical advice while writing the concerto. Reed helped him with bowings, passage-work and fingerings, playing passages over and over again until Elgar was satisfied with them. (Note: Elgar and Reed spent much time together and became lifelong friends. Elgar had already had help with the sketches from the violinist Leonora Speyer (professionally known as Madame von Stosch) in January 1910. In March of that year Reed played through the sketches of the concerto, at Elgar's London flat.) Kreisler also made suggestions, some for making the solo part more brilliant and some for making it more playable. (Note: The violinist Philippe Graffin, who recorded a performance using the manuscript rather than the published score in 2006, counted 40 differences between Elgar's original text and the published version, although most of them are very slight.) Before the premiere, Reed, with Elgar playing the orchestral part on the piano, played through the work at a private party. (Note: The performance took place at a gathering organised by Frank Schuster before the 1910 Three Choirs Festival. Reed recalled the occasion: "The guests were all assembled and the lights lowered ... Sir Edward took his seat at the piano, and a tense whisper to me 'You are not going to leave me all alone in the tuttis, are you?' we began. ... I must confess to a few qualms as I took my violin out of its case that Sunday evening, and realised that probably nearly all the prominent musicians engaged in the Festival were there, besides some of the musical critics and the house party, but my fears vanished at the first note, and I became thrilled by the atmosphere created, the very evident appreciation of the listeners and the magnetic force which flowed from Sir Edward.")

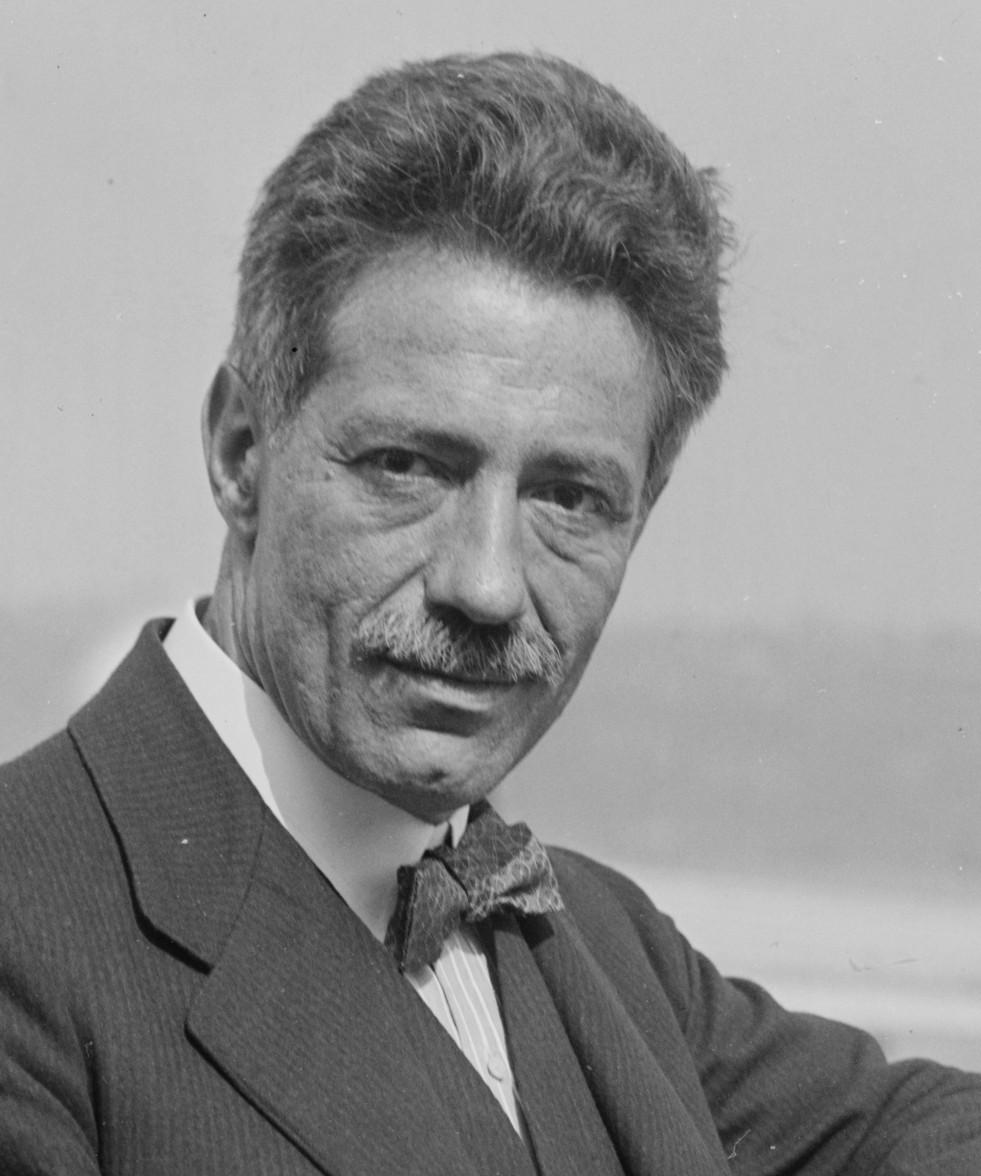
Fritz Kreisler, dedicatee of the concerto

The premiere was at a Royal Philharmonic Society concert on 10 November 1910, with Kreisler and the London Symphony Orchestra conducted by the composer. Reed recalled, "the Concerto proved to be a complete triumph, the concert a brilliant and unforgettable occasion". So great was the impact of the concerto that Kreisler's rival Eugène Ysaÿe spent much time with Elgar going through the work. There was great disappointment when contractual difficulties prevented Ysaÿe from playing it in London.

The concerto was Elgar's last great popular success. Of his later large-scale works neither the Second Symphony nor Falstaff nor the Cello Concerto achieved the immediate popularity of the First Symphony or this concerto. Elgar remained particularly fond of the work. His friend Charles Sanford Terry recalled "I have never heard Elgar speak of the personal note in his music except in regard to the concerto, and of it I heard him say more than once, 'I love it'." Elgar told Ivor Atkins that he would like the nobilmente theme in the andante inscribed on his tomb.

Even in the 1950s when Elgar's music was unfashionable, the concerto featured frequently in concert programmes. By the end of the twentieth century, when Elgar's music was once again in the general repertoire, there were more than 20 gramophone recordings of the concerto. In 2010, the centenary year of the work, the violinist Nikolaj Znaider began a series of performances in venues including Vienna, London and New York, with the Vienna Philharmonic, London Symphony Orchestra, New York Philharmonic, and conductors Valery Gergiev and Sir Colin Davis. Also in 2010 Philippe Graffin gave a performance at the Three Choirs Festival using Elgar's original manuscript, and new recordings were issued by Znaider, Thomas Zehetmair, and Tasmin Little.

== Enigmatic inscription ==
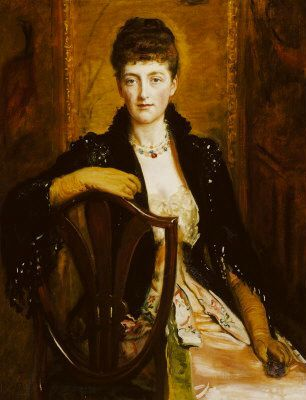
Alice Stuart-Wortley, Elgar's "Windflower", one of several women conjectured as the composer's muse

The concerto is dedicated to Kreisler, but the score also carries the Spanish inscription, "Aquí está encerrada el alma de ....." ("Herein is enshrined the soul of ....."), a quotation from the novel Gil Blas by Alain-René Lesage. The five dots are one of Elgar's enigmas, and several names have been proposed to match the inscription. It has been widely believed to allude to Alice Stuart-Wortley, daughter of the painter John Everett Millais. She was Elgar's dear friend whom he nicknamed "Windflower", and his love for her and her inspiration to him are well known. There is no definite proof linking her to the inscription of the concerto, although Elgar dubbed several of the themes "Windflower", and in his letters to her he referred to it as "our concerto".

Another possible inspiration for the concerto was Elgar's early love Helen Weaver, to whom he was briefly engaged in the 1880s. Dora Powell ("Dorabella" of the Enigma Variations) suggested a third possible candidate, Elgar's American friend Julia "Pippa" Worthington: Powell recalled an occasion at the Elgars' house, Plâs Gwyn, when she was looking at a copy of the score of the concerto:

I came next to the Spanish quotation ... the five dots caught my eye and a name immediately sprang to my mind. The Lady [i.e. Alice Elgar] came and stood by me, saw what I was looking at, and translated the Spanish sentence: "Herein is enshrined the soul of ..." Then she went on to fill in the name – that of a personal friend ... Mrs. Julia H. Worthington, a most charming and kind American friend. She was known to intimate friends by another name – also of five letters, and I cannot say definitely whether the composer had this name or her first Christian name in mind. Nor does this matter; the gap is now filled. (Note: Alice Elgar's diaries mention that Julia Worthington was called "Pippa" by her friends – a five-letter name. In 1950, Mrs Powell wrote to the composer Harold Rutland, "What a curious fact it is that people seem to prefer anything but a fact. Having kept my promise to Lady Elgar for 40 years not to reveal the 'Secret of the Five Dots', I find now that no one cares to know the truth, and I have even heard something about 'pricked bubbles'.")

The Elgar biographer Jerrold Northrop Moore suggests that the inscription does not refer to just one person, but enshrined in each movement of the concerto are both a living inspiration and a ghost: Alice Stuart-Wortley and Helen Weaver in the first movement; Elgar's wife and his mother in the second; and in the finale, Billy Reed and August Jaeger ("Nimrod" of the Enigma Variations).

== Music ==
Elgar's violin concerto is scored for solo violin, two flutes, two oboes, two clarinets in A, two bassoons, contrabassoon (ad lib), four horns in F, two trumpets in A, three trombones, tuba (ad lib), 3 timpani and strings.

Elgar said of the Violin Concerto, "It's good! Awfully emotional! Too emotional, but I love it." Like the vast majority of earlier violin concertos, Elgar's has three movements. The Elgar biographer Michael Kennedy suggests that structurally the concerto is modelled on those by Brahms and perhaps Bruch. It is on a very large scale for a concerto, typically taking between 45 and 55 minutes to perform (see "Recordings" below for indicative timings).

There are three movements:

1. Allegro
2. Andante
3. Allegro molto

=== I. Allegro ===
The first movement, in traditional sonata form, begins with a long orchestral exposition of the themes. Six related themes are presented, ranging through several keys, after which the first theme is repeated, first by the orchestra and then by the solo violin. This passage is described by Kennedy as "one of the most effective and haunting entries by the solo instrument to be found in any concerto". The solo line repeats and elaborates the five themes, particularly the second subject which has appeared briefly in the opening orchestral section and is transformed in the solo part into the "Windflower" theme, (Note: Elgar referred to several of the themes as "Windflower" themes, but the name is particularly associated with this theme. The theme reappears in the finale; the critic Samuel Langford wrote of it, "Each time the opening phrase of melody is repeated it vanishes in a mysterious coruscation of ascending notes which suggest the swift passing of a beauty once cherished as the hope and sum of life".) "of a poetic beauty exceptional even for Elgar". The movement follows the classical pattern of development and recapitulation, in which "the interplay between violinist and orchestra is on an heroic scale", and ends with an orchestral flourish.

=== II. Andante ===
The second movement, in the key of B♭, has a shorter orchestral prelude, and is mostly quiet and songful, but rises to an impassioned climax. Kennedy calls it "a display of sustained and noble eloquence".

=== III. Allegro molto ===
The last movement begins with a quiet but strenuous violin passage, accompanied by the orchestra, with many double stops and fast arpeggios; themes from the first and second movements are recalled and then, as the movement seems to be heading for a conventional finish, there is an unexpected and unconventional accompanied cadenza in which the orchestra supports the solo with a pizzicato tremolando thrumming effect. This cadenza, though demanding to perform, is not the usual virtuoso showpiece: it is the emotional and structural climax of the whole work. Themes from earlier in the work, including the "Windflower" theme, are restated and finally the concerto ends in a characteristic blaze of orchestral sound.

== Recordings ==
The first recording of the concerto was a truncated version made by the Gramophone Company, and released on His Master's Voice, in December 1916, using the acoustic process, the technical limitations of which necessitated drastic rearrangement of the score. There were two 12-inch discs: D79-80. The soloist was Marie Hall, and the unnamed orchestra was conducted by the composer. Electrical recording, introduced in the 1920s, gave a greatly improved dynamic range and realism, and the two leading English record companies, Columbia and Gramophone, both made recordings of the concerto that remain in the catalogue.

In spite of the existence of a magnificent recording of his Violin Concerto by Albert Sammons, whose authority and interpretation of this greatest English work for violin will never be bettered, I had a great ambition to have Sir Edward himself conduct the work. As a youthful and pliant performer without prejudice, who would respond best to his instruction, I selected Yehudi Menuhin as the most promising soloist

— Fred Gaisberg

The first complete recording was made in 1929 for Columbia by Albert Sammons with the New Queen's Hall Orchestra conducted by Sir Henry Wood. Gramophone hoped to record the work with Kreisler, but he proved elusive (believing Elgar to be a poor conductor) and Gramophone's producer, Fred Gaisberg, turned instead to the young Yehudi Menuhin. The recording was made at EMI's Abbey Road Studio 1 in June 1932 and has remained in print on 78, LP and CD ever since. These two recordings typify the two contrasting approaches to the work that have existed ever since: Sammons and Wood, in a brisk performance, take just over 43 minutes to play the work; Menuhin and Elgar, in a more overtly expressive reading take almost 50 minutes. Other recordings of the monaural era include those by Jascha Heifetz (1949) and Alfredo Campoli (1954). Both these performances are in the Sammons/Wood tradition, taking, respectively, approximately 42 and 45 minutes.

Many modern stereo recordings favour the slower approach of Menuhin and Elgar. Menuhin himself in his stereo remake in 1965 was slightly quicker (just under 48 minutes) than he had been in 1932, but Pinchas Zukerman in his two studio versions took a little over 50 minutes in his first recording and a little under 49 in his second. Both of Nigel Kennedy's recordings play for nearly 54 minutes. Itzhak Perlman's is slightly faster, at just over 47 minutes; and Dong-Suk Kang's takes under 45 minutes. The slowest version recorded is with Ida Haendel and Sir Adrian Boult conducting the London Philharmonic Orchestra, at well over 55 minutes. A recording released in 2006 used a text based on Elgar's manuscript score rather than the published version. Reviewing the CD in June 2006 the Gramophone critic Edward Greenfield observed, "... the differences are very small ... I have to confess that had I not been told, I might have appreciated only two of them." (Note: "At two points in the first movement brief passagework which originally used triplet quavers was changed in the finished version to semiquaver groups. That is over in a flash each time, but more noticeable is the fact that the double-stopped violin flourish on the final page of the finale is less elaborate than what we know. That change, it seems, is owed not to Kreisler but to Lady Elgar, urging such a change on her husband, who duly responded.")

The BBC Radio 3 feature "Building a Library" has presented comparative reviews of all available versions of the concerto on two occasions. The Penguin Guide to Recorded Classical Music, 2008, has three pages of reviews of recordings of the work. The versions recommended by both the BBC and The Penguin Guide are those by Menuhin (1932) and Sammons (1929).

== Notes and references ==
Notes

== Bibliography ==
- Anderson, Robert (1990). Elgar in Manuscript. Boston Spa: British Library. ISBN 0-7123-0203-4.
- Gaisberg, Frederick William (1946). Music on Record. London: Robert Hale. OCLC 17703599.
- Kennedy, Michael (1970). Elgar Orchestral Music. London: BBC. OCLC 252020259.
- Kennedy, Michael (1987). Portrait of Elgar (Third ed.). Oxford: Clarendon Press. ISBN 0-19-284017-7.
- March, Ivan, ed. (2008). The Penguin Guide to Recorded Classical Music. London: Penguin Books. ISBN 978-0-14-103336-5.
- Powell, Dora M. (1949). Elgar: Memories of a Variation (Third ed.). London: Methuen. OCLC 504704196.
- Reed, W.H. (1946). Elgar. London: Dent. OCLC 8858707.
