= The Music Makers (Elgar) =

1912 work for choir, orchestra and female soloist

Edward Elgar in 1917

The Music Makers, Op. 69, is a work for contralto or mezzo-soprano, chorus and orchestra composed by Edward Elgar. It was first performed at the Birmingham Festival in 1912.

== Text ==
The text of the work is the 1874 poem Ode by Arthur O'Shaughnessy, which Elgar set in its entirety. He had been working on the music intermittently since 1903, without a specific commission. He completed it after receiving a commission from the Birmingham Triennial Music Festival. It was dedicated to "my friend Nicholas Kilburn".

The words of the poem no doubt appealed to Elgar's nature, as it celebrates the dreaming artist — by 1912, he was established as part of British artistic society, but was ambivalent at best about that society. The mood of the Ode is clear in the first lines, which depict the isolation of the creative artist:

We are the music makers,
And we are the dreamers of dreams,
Wandering by lone sea-breakers,
And sitting by desolate streams...

Later verses celebrate the importance of the artist to his society.

== First and later performances ==
The Music Makers was commissioned for, and first performed at, the Birmingham Triennial Music Festival on 1 October 1912, with Muriel Foster as the soloist and the composer conducting.

Performances are now rare, particularly outside England.

== Criticism ==
Early criticism of the work was directed more at the words than at the music, but it was also dismissed as tawdry and self-centred.

== Analysis ==
The music is for the most part reserved and personal, and Elgar quotes his own music several times. Sometimes there is a specific verbal cue: for example, the word "dreams" is accompanied by a theme from The Dream of Gerontius, and "sea-breakers" by the opening of Sea Pictures. The music also quotes the first and second symphonies, the Violin Concerto, the Enigma Variations, Rule, Britannia and La Marseillaise. Most of the music however is original.

The self-quotations inevitably bring to mind Strauss's Ein Heldenleben, but with different intent; Elgar is depicting the artist not as hero but as bard.

== Notable recordings ==
- Elgar recorded extracts of the work at the Three Choirs Festival on September 8, 1927.
- London Philharmonic Choir (chorus master : Frederic Jackson), London Philharmonic Orchestra and with Janet Baker, conducted by Adrian Boult, coupled with The Dream of Gerontius (EMI, December 1966)
- BBC Symphony Orchestra and chorus with Jean Rigby, conducted by Andrew Davis, coupled with short orchestral pieces (Teldec, 1994)
- Hallé Orchestra and Choir with Jane Irwin, conducted by Mark Elder, coupled with Froissart, Dream Children and J.S. Bach's Fantasia and Fugue in C minor (Hallé HLL 7509, 2005)
- Music Makers / Sea Pictures, Naxos 8.557710. Sarah Connolly, Bournemouth Symphony Orchestra, conducted by Simon Wright. This recording was a 2007 Grammy nominee, for the Grammy Award for Best Classical Vocal Performance
