= Falstaff (Elgar) =

Symphonic work by Elgar

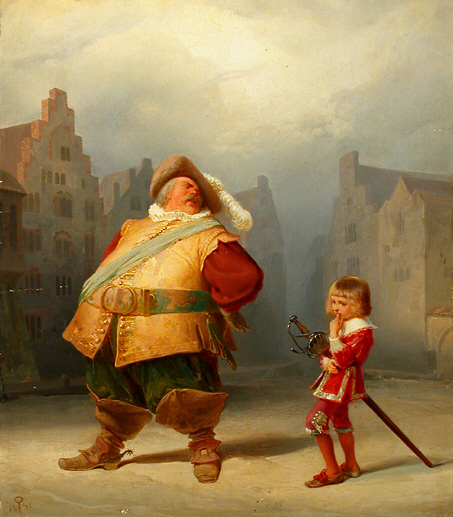
Adolf Schrödter: Falstaff and his page

Falstaff – Symphonic Study in C minor, Op. 68, is an orchestral work by the English composer Edward Elgar. Though not so designated by the composer, it is a symphonic poem in the tradition of Franz Liszt and Richard Strauss. It portrays Sir John Falstaff, the "fat knight" of William Shakespeare's Henry IV Parts 1 and 2.

The work was well received at its première in 1913, but did not inspire the great enthusiasm aroused by some of Elgar's earlier works. The composer thought it his finest orchestral piece, and many Elgar admirers agree, but it has not become a popular favourite. Compared to other Elgar works, it is infrequently played in the concert hall, although it is well represented in the CD catalogues.

== Instrumentation ==
Falstaff is scored for an orchestra of two flutes and piccolo, two oboes and cor anglais, two clarinets and bass clarinet, two bassoons and contrabassoon, four horns, three trumpets, three trombones, tuba, timpani, percussion (side drum, triangle, tabor, tambourine, bass drum, cymbals), two harps (second harp ad lib), and strings.

== Structure ==
Elgar set out the divisions of the score in an "analytical essay" in The Musical Times in 1913:

1. Falstaff and Prince Henry
2. Eastcheap – Gadshill – The Boar's Head. Revelry and sleep – Dream Interlude: 'Jack Falstaff, now Sir John, a boy, and page to Thomas Mowbray, Duke of Norfolk' (Poco allegretto)
3. Falstaff's march – The return through Gloucestershire – Interlude: Gloucestershire. Shallow's orchard (Allegretto) – The new king – The hurried ride to London
4. King Henry V's progress – The repudiation of Falstaff, and his death

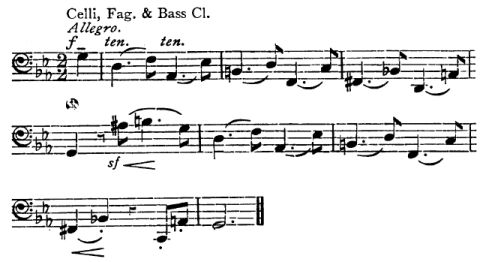
Falstaff theme

Prince Hal theme

In the first section, Elgar establishes the two main themes of the piece, that for Prince Hal (marked grandioso) being courtly and grand, and that for Falstaff himself showing "a goodly, portly man, of a cheerful look, a pleasing eye and a most noble carriage." Arrigo Boito adapted these words of Falstaff for his libretto for the Verdi opera of the same name, but the Falstaff of the opera is essentially the buffo character from The Merry Wives of Windsor, whereas Elgar's is the Falstaff of Henry IV.

The subsequent development of the score follows closely the key events of the two parts of Henry IV, in which Falstaff features. The Gadshill section (from Henry IV, Part 1) shows him attempting a gold bullion robbery but being himself attacked and robbed by the disguised Hal and his companions. Falstaff returns to his base at the inn and drowns his sorrows in drink. In his drunken sleep, he dreams of his youth, when he was a slim page to the Duke of Norfolk. Here too Boito/Verdi and Elgar treat the same material quite differently: in the opera, Falstaff's nostalgic reminiscence is a lively little aria ("Quand' ero paggio"), but Elgar's treatment is slow and wistful.

Part III of the score moves to Shakespeare's Henry IV, Part 2. After Falstaff's summons to court and commission to raise soldiers for the King's army, there is a battle scene and then a second interlude, an English idyll in a Gloucestershire orchard. This is dispelled by the news of the King's death and Prince Hal's accession. As in the play, Falstaff hurries to London, confident of favours from the new monarch, but is instead dismissed and banished. Finally the broken Falstaff, having crept away, lies dying – "the king hath killed his heart" – and after a return of the theme of the second interlude, a quiet C major chord in the brass and a hushed roll on the side-drum portray Falstaff's death. The work ends with a very brief version of Prince Hal's theme showing, in the composer's words, that "the man of stern reality has triumphed."

== History and critical reception ==
In 1912 the Leeds Festival commissioned Elgar to write a new work to be performed the following year. Before the première Elgar told a reporter, "I have, I think, enjoyed writing it more than any other music I have composed and perhaps for that reason it may prove to be among my better efforts". It was first performed at Leeds on 1 October 1913, conducted by the composer. The Musical Times commented, "the work is unsurpassed in modern music for variety, effectiveness and sureness of orchestral writing." The London première was on 3 November 1913, at the Queen's Hall, conducted by the dedicatee, Landon Ronald. The Times said of the London première that it was played to "a not very large but very enthusiastic audience" and subsequently Falstaff has remained less popular than other major Elgar works, though much loved by aficionados. Music and Letters noted in its obituary of Elgar that though "a majority would call Falstaff his greatest work" most people would "say they like the Enigma best." Even during Elgar's lifetime, the musical scholar Percy Scholes wrote of Falstaff that it was a "great work" but "so far as public appreciation goes, a comparative failure."

Sir Donald Tovey viewed Falstaff as "one of the immeasurably great things in music" with power "identical with Shakespeare's," and the 1955 reference work The Record Guide described Falstaff as "the only tone poem of its day that suffers nothing by comparison with the best of Richard Strauss's works in the genre". Bernard Shaw wrote that "[Elgar] made the band do it all, and with such masterful success that one cannot bear to think what would have been the result of a mere attempt to turn the play into an opera." Others were less impressed with the work. The dedicatee, Landon Ronald, admitted to John Barbirolli, "Never could make head or tail of the piece, my dear boy." After a performance by the New York Philharmonic in 1983, the critic of The New York Times opined that the conductor (Andrew Davis) "could not do much, in fact, to rescue the character's spirited braggadocio from the programmatic detail that smothered the music." The well-known Elgarian writer Michael Kennedy criticised the work for "too frequent reliance on sequences" and an over-idealised depiction of the female characters. Even Elgar's great friend and champion, W. H. Reed, thought that the principal themes show less distinction than some of Elgar's earlier works. Reed acknowledged, nevertheless, that Elgar himself thought Falstaff the highest point of his purely orchestral work.

== Recordings ==
Though concert performances have been comparatively rare, the work has been well served in recordings. There were no fewer than 20 recorded versions of the work by 2007. The composer's own 1931–1932 recording with the London Symphony Orchestra, produced by Fred Gaisberg of His Master's Voice, was widely praised both at the time of its release and when it was remastered for LP and then for CD. Sir John Barbirolli's 1964 Hallé recording on His Master's Voice was chosen by BBC Radio 3's Record Review as the recommended version, even over the composer's own. In 2007, the classical music magazine Gramophone compared 20 recorded versions of Falstaff and selected Barbirolli's recording as "the essential choice" and "one of the pinnacles of the Elgar discography."

Sir Adrian Boult was closely associated with the work and made three recordings of it. His final version, set down in 1973, was praised by critics for emphasising the "symphonic'" aspect. In 1978, Vernon Handley and the London Philharmonic Orchestra recorded a version for Classics for Pleasure that Gramophone praised for its "spacious yet purposeful conception" and "meticulous fidelity to the letter and spirit of the score and architectural splendour." In 2005, the BBC also recommended a Naxos recording by David Lloyd-Jones and the English Northern Philharmonia, and in 2007 Gramophone marked it as the "bargain choice" recording of Falstaff.
