= In the South (Alassio) =

Concert overture by Edward Elgar

Elgar's manuscript of In the South

In the South (Alassio), Op. 50, is a concert overture composed by Edward Elgar during a family holiday in Italy in the winter of 1903 to 1904. He was working on a symphony, but the local atmosphere inspired him instead to write what some have seen as a tone poem, with an Italian flavour. At about 20 minutes' duration it was the composer's longest sustained orchestral piece to that time.

The work was premiered in London in 1904. It is less often heard in concert than some other Elgar pieces, but has received many recordings.

== Background and first performance ==
After years of struggle, by 1903 Elgar had become well known. A three-day festival of his music was planned for March the following year at the Royal Opera House, Covent Garden, in the presence of Edward VII and Queen Alexandra. It was an open secret that Elgar was planning to compose a symphony for the festival. He intended to work on it while holidaying in Italy over Christmas 1903. He and his wife and daughter stayed first at Bordighera and then at the Villa San Giovanni, Alassio. Inspiration for the symphony eluded him, but the local atmosphere – "the thoughts and sensations of one beautiful afternoon in the Vale of Andora" – gave him the ideas for a concert overture. (Note: The manuscript, held by the Royal Academy of Music, shows that Elgar originally used the term "fantasia" for the piece. Before the premiere his publishers, Novello, were advertising the forthcoming work as a "Fantasy-Overture", and Elgar did not decide until late February 1904 that he wanted, as he put it, to "drop the fantasia".) He later recalled:

… in a flash, it all came to me – the conflict of the armies on that very spot long ago, where I now stood – the contrast of the ruin and the shepherd – and then, all of a sudden, I came back to reality. In that time I had composed the overture – the rest was merely writing it down.

The work is dedicated "To my friend Leo F. Schuster", the driving force behind the 1904 Elgar Festival. The premiere was given by the Hallé Orchestra on 16 March 1904, the third day of the festival. It was to have been conducted by Hans Richter, who was in charge for the rest of the concert, but as Elgar did not have the score ready in time for Richter to study it before the performance, Elgar conducted the orchestra himself.

The first American performance was given by the Chicago Symphony Orchestra, conducted by Theodore Thomas on 4 November 1904. Walter Damrosch conducted the New York premiere the following day. Arthur Nikisch introduced the work to German audiences in Berlin on 2 December 1904, and it was given in Vienna in March 1905, Cologne, under Fritz Steinbach, the following month, and Prague the following year.

== Analysis ==
The work is written for a full symphony orchestra comprising 3 flutes (3rd doubling piccolo), 2 oboes, cor anglais, 2 clarinets, bass clarinet, 2 bassoons, contrabassoon, 4 horns, 3 trumpets, 3 trombones, tuba, 3 timpani, percussion (bass drum, cymbals, side drum, triangle and glockenspiel), harp and the string section.

At about 20 minutes in performance, In the South was the longest continuous orchestral piece Elgar had written to that date. It opens with a vigorous theme that he had written in 1899 in the visitors' book of his friend G. R. Sinclair to illustrate the latter's bulldog "triumphant after a fight". (Note: Elgar also portrayed Sinclair's dog Dan in the Enigma Variations, splashing about in the river in variation XI.) The music critic Michael Kennedy writes that "nothing in the whole of Elgar is more thrilling than the leaping opening". Sir Donald Tovey has compared it with the "Straussian panache" of Don Juan – "a group of heroic themes swinging along at full speed from the outset".

The ebullient opening is followed by a calmer, pastoral section. The music then becomes agitated and moves into a grandioso section in A♭ minor, illustrative of the days of the Roman empire, with what Elgar called "the relentless and domineering onward force of the ancient day" and the "drums and tramplings of a later time". This passage was inspired by the ruins of a huge Roman viaduct. From this theme a brilliant "striding" theme emerges and leads, through muted strings, to the second episode, quickly dubbed the "canto popolare". Kennedy suggests that giving this theme to the viola is a conscious homage to Berlioz's Harold in Italy.

The theme recurs as a horn solo, before returning, over a drum-roll, to the viola, after which Elgar returns to the beginning of the overture for a formal recapitulation. After that, a nobilmente theme from the opening is transmuted into a gentle 6/4 melody, which is developed to a final climax for full orchestra.

== Arrangements ==
The "canto popolare" so convincingly struck an authentically Italian note that it was widely assumed to be an adaptation of a popular local song, although it was entirely of Elgar's own invention. Elgar later published a version of it with words taken from a poem by Shelley, as a song for soprano or tenor, under the title "In Moonlight". (Note: The song was included on a 2008 CD, performed by Christine Rice with piano accompaniment by Sir Mark Elder. It follows a performance of In the South by Elder and the Hallé.) Ernest Newman, commented that the words and music were not a good match, with the rhythms of the verse "pushed and pulled" to fit the music: "you finally declare that by similar treatment anything – an Act of Parliament or a patent medicine advertisement – could be made to 'go with' the melody equally well". Elgar made an arrangement of the "canto popolare" for violin and piano, in collaboration with the violinist Isabella Jaeger, wife of his close friend August Jaeger. At the same time, he made an arrangement for solo piano, and his publisher, Novello, also issued an arrangement of the whole concert overture for piano duet, made by Adolf Schmid.

== Critical reception ==
The initial reception of In the South was generally enthusiastic. After the premiere The Musical Times found the themes "subjected to elaborate and remarkably individual treatment", the scoring "superb", and the whole piece "perhaps the most beautiful orchestral work which the composer has given to the world". The Monthly Musical Record called the piece "as brilliant and inspiring a piece of writing as anything that Dr Elgar has produced". More recent analyses have expressed reservations about the length and structure of the piece. In Kennedy's view, the term "overture" would lead performers and audiences to expect a work shorter than the 20 minutes taken by In the South. Jerrold Northrop Moore judges the piece to have symphonic aspirations – "the wish for the Symphony still unachieved" and Percy Young similarly comments on an overextended structural design. Julian Rushton finds the profusion of themes and their development lacking the concision that gives Elgar's earlier concert overture Cockaigne "its crisp authority", and in his view the composer's scenic approach undermines the unity of the overture: "its parts are greater than the whole, for it is not ideally connected".

== Performances and recordings ==
In the South is less often heard in the concert hall than many of Elgar's other major orchestral works. Remarking on the fact, The Musical Times speculated in 1973, "Why has Elgar's In the South failed to catch on even with today's enthusiasm for his music? The subtitle 'Alassio' and the modest description 'concert overture' for what is virtually a tone-poem may have proved discouraging or confusing – unfortunately, in the early stages of appreciation, titles do matter." The work is well represented on record, with recordings from every decade since the 1920s:

Orchestra	Conductor	Year
Royal Albert Hall	Sir Edward Elgar	1921–1923
London Symphony	Sir Edward Elgar	1930
National Symphony	Boyd Neel	1945
London Symphony	George Weldon	1954
Leipzig Radio Symphony	Gerhard Pflüger	1954
London Philharmonic	Sir Adrian Boult	1955 (Note: Live concert performance; recording first released in 2020)
London Philharmonic	Sir Adrian Boult	1956
Bournemouth Symphony	Constantin Silvestri	1967
Hallé	Sir John Barbirolli	1970 (Note: Live concert performance; recording first released in 2000)
London Philharmonic	Sir Adrian Boult	1972 (Note: Live concert performance; recording first released in 1995)
BBC Symphony	John Pritchard	1974
London Philharmonic	Daniel Barenboim	1977
London Philharmonic	Sir Georg Solti	1979
Scottish National Orchestra	Sir Alexander Gibson	1983
Royal Philharmonic	Yehudi Menuhin	1987
Royal Philharmonic	Andrew Litton	1988
Royal Philharmonic	Yondani Butt	1988
Philharmonia	Giuseppe Sinopoli	1989
London Philharmonic	Gürer Aykal	1989
BBC Philharmonic	Edward Downes	1990
Academy of St. Martin in the Fields	Neville Marriner	1990
London Philharmonic	Leonard Slatkin	1991
BBC Symphony	Andrew Davis	1992
London Symphony	Jeffrey Tate	1992
Orchestra Filarmonica della Scala	Riccardo Muti	1994
Bournemouth Symphony	George Hurst	1995
Vienna Philharmonic	John Eliot Gardiner	1998
Hallé	Mark Elder	2002
BBC Symphony	Leonard Slatkin	2002 (Note: Live concert performance; recording first released in 2006)
Royal Liverpool Philharmonic	Douglas Bostock	2003
Moscow Symphony	Vladimir Ziva	2003
BBC National Orchestra of Wales	Richard Hickox	2005
Philharmonia	Sir Andrew Davis	2009
Sydney Symphony	Vladimir Ashkenazy	2011
Orchestra dell'Accademia Nazionale di Santa Cecilia	Sir Antonio Pappano	2013
Stuttgart Radio Symphony	Sir Roger Norrington	2014
BBC Scottish Symphony	Martyn Brabbins	2016
Royal Liverpool Philharmonic	Vasily Petrenko	2019
English Symphony Orchestra	Kenneth Woods	2023

== Notes, references and sources ==
=== Sources ===
- Allis, Michael (2012). British Music and Literary Context: Artistic Connections in the Long Nineteenth Century. Woodbridge: Boydell Press. ISBN 978-1-84383-730-5.
- Del Mar, Norman (1998). Conducting Elgar. Oxford: Clarendon Press. ISBN 0198165579.
- Elgar, Edward (1904). In the South (Alassio) (PDF). London: Novello. OCLC 1115071384. Archived from the original (PDF) on 20 August 2021.
- Kennedy, Michael (1970). Elgar. London: BBC. OCLC 1244717492.
- Kennedy, Michael (1987). Portrait of Elgar (third ed.). Oxford University Press. ISBN 978-0-19-284017-2.
- Kennedy, Michael (2008). The Life of Elgar. Cambridge: Cambridge University Press. ISBN 978-0-521-81076-0.
- Moore, Jerrold Northrop (1984). Edward Elgar: A Creative Life. Oxford University Press. ISBN 978-0-19-315447-6.
- Newman, Ernest (1906). Elgar (third ed.). London: J. Lane. OCLC 2560311.
- Rushton, Julian (2005). "In Search of the Symphony: Orchestral Music to 1908". In Daniel Grimley; Julian Rushton (eds.). Cambridge Companion to Elgar. Cambridge: Cambridge University Press. ISBN 978-1-139-00225-7.
- Tovey, Donald (1939). Essays In Musical Analysis, Vol VI. London: Oxford University Press. OCLC 957498479.
