= Nursery Suite =

Edward Elgar composition

Elgar in 1917

The Nursery Suite is one of the last compositions by the English composer Edward Elgar. Like Elgar's The Wand of Youth suites, it makes use of sketches from the composer's childhood.

There are seven movements and a coda:

1. Aubade (Awake)
2. The Serious Doll
3. Busy-ness
4. The Sad Doll
5. The Waggon (Passes)
6. The Merry Doll
7. Dreaming – Envoy (Coda)

== History ==
The composition of the Nursery Suite came about when Elgar mentioned in September 1930 to William Laundon Streeton of His Master's Voice (the Gramophone Company) that he had lately run across a box of musical sketches from the days of his youth. Streeton suggested that, as Master of the King's Musick, he might suitably draw on them for a work to mark the recent birth of Princess Margaret Rose (then fourth in line to the throne). The suite was dedicated to Princess Margaret, her older sister Princess Elizabeth (the future Queen Elizabeth II) and their mother (the Duchess of York).

Most of the movements appear light, in the style of The Wand of Youth suites, and predominantly sunny in character. Some commentators have made an exception of "The Waggon (Passes)": the Elgar authority Michael Kennedy suggests that as the wagon (Elgar used the older spelling, 'waggon') rumbles towards us the music becomes sinister in a manner reminiscent of the bars in the Scherzo of the Second Symphony, when, in Elgar's words, "the wheels go over my head". Anthony Payne drew on the form of this movement for the ending of his elaboration of the Third Symphony sketches.

The Nursery Suite was one of the first pieces of orchestral music to receive its premiere in a recording studio (Kingsway Hall, London) rather than a concert hall (although Elgar's very first recording session, in January 1914, had included the premiere of the miniature "Carissima"). At its premiere on 23 May 1931, all but the two last movements were recorded under the baton of the composer. The last two movements were added when the whole suite was performed on 4 June 1931 before an invited audience including Princess Elizabeth, aged five, and her parents. The piece takes about 25 minutes to perform.

Reviewing the work when it first appeared, W. R. Anderson wrote in The Gramophone: "The last movement, with its striking violin cadenza, seems especially significant. It hints at memories, which even in music are best hinted at, not explicitly stated: not because they hurt, but because youth can only understand them so. … There is the old fire here, with at least two movements out of the other six showing a freshness distinct from that of the Wand of Youth … with the natural greatness of heart and spirit – something more than any genius can confer – that marks, and has marked through all his life, our beloved Edward Elgar."

The ballet "Nursery Suite", with Elgar's music, choreography by Ninette de Valois and scenery and costumes by Nancy Allen, was first performed by the Vic-Wells Ballet (now Royal Ballet) on 19 March 1932 at the Sadler's Wells Theatre. The cast included Anton Dolin, Alicia Markova and Joy Newton. The choreographer Frederick Ashton used The Nursery Suite for a new ballet (his last) in 1986 for the Queen's sixtieth birthday gala at the Royal Opera House.

== Instrumentation ==
It is scored for 2 flutes, 2 oboes, 2 clarinets in B♭, 2 bassoons, 4 horns in F, 2 trumpets (both in B♭ & C), 3 trombones, tuba, timpani (3), 2 percussionists (first with triangle, tambourine and glockenspiel, second with snare drum, triangle, tambourine, bass drum and cymbals), and strings. Not all these instruments are played in all movements.
