= Symphony No. 3 (Elgar/Payne) =

20th-century symphony by Edward Elgar and Anthony Payne

Elgar

Edward Elgar's Symphony No. 3 Op. 88 (posth.) was incomplete at the time of his death in 1934. Elgar left 130 pages of sketches, which the British composer Anthony Payne worked on for many years, producing a complete symphony in 1997, officially known as "Edward Elgar: the sketches for Symphony No 3 elaborated by Anthony Payne" or in brief "Elgar/Payne Symphony No 3".

The first public performance was at the Royal Festival Hall, London, on 15 February 1998, by the BBC Symphony Orchestra conducted by Andrew Davis.

A typical performance of the symphony takes about 55 minutes.

== History ==
After the death of his wife in 1920, Elgar retreated into semi-retirement, producing no large-scale works. His friend and champion Bernard Shaw held that the BBC should commission a new Elgar symphony, and with the aid of the conductor Landon Ronald he persuaded the BBC to do so. Elgar worked on the new piece during the last year of his life, jotting down short snatches of bars, as well as composing pages in full score.

Realising that he would not complete the score, the dying Elgar did not destroy the sketches, and made contradictory remarks about the unfinished work. He told his friend the violinist W. H. Reed, "Don't let anyone tinker with it", but to his doctor he said, "If I can't complete the Third Symphony, somebody will complete it – or write a better one". Elgar and Reed had often played through various sketches for the symphony on violin and piano, and Reed knew more than anyone about Elgar's intentions. Reed reproduced more than forty pages of the most important sketches in his book Elgar as I Knew Him, probably to illustrate what he believed to be the impossibility of weaving them into a coherent whole. Their publication in 1936 meant that seventy years later they went into the public domain, and the Elgar family were powerless to prevent anyone from "tinkering with" the sketches.

In 1974 a BBC Radio 3 producer, Dr Roger Fiske, devised a programme about the Symphony, and orchestrated some of the sketches, completing Elgar's unfinished score and composing some other passages. Elgar's daughter, Carice, gave her approval and Sir Adrian Boult agreed to conduct the music. The score was sent for copying to Maurice Johnstone, a former BBC head of music. Johnstone felt strongly that the broadcast would amount to "tinkering" with the score and he persuaded Boult to withdraw from the project on ethical grounds and the programme was subsequently dropped. A similar proposed feature for BBC television in 1979 also came to nothing.

The British composer Anthony Payne had become interested in the sketches in 1972, and in 1993 the BBC invited him to work on them for a workshop performance. In the event the performance did not take place, because of objections from the Elgar family. Payne nevertheless continued to work on the sketches, completing the Scherzo, the Adagio and the first movement of the work. The Elgar family decided to commission Payne to make an authorised version. Payne later wrote, "It was during this process that I became more consciously aware of the overall sweep of the symphony. It was different in its sheer breadth of emotion from any of his other symphonic works: there was the raw vigour and magic lyricism of the opening movement, the use of a lighter manner in the second which went far beyond his established symphonic practice, and the searing intensity of the Adagio, tragic in its import, while the finale revealed a world of chivalric action and drama."

His greatest difficulty was in completing the finale, as Elgar had left few clues about its structure and none about how it would end. Payne wrote both the entire development section and the coda. He decided to end the work quietly, following the model of 'The Wagon Passes' in Elgar's Nursery Suite. According to Payne, "The finale's main subject actually suggests this kind of treatment, and it would lead the music away into some new visionary world, spanning the years between the composer's death and my attempted realisation of his sketches. I trusted my intuition and went ahead and wrote".

The first public performance was at the Royal Festival Hall on 15 February 1998, by the BBC Symphony Orchestra conducted by Andrew Davis. During 1998-99 it was performed at the BBC Proms, Royal Albert Hall, London (13 August), in Glasgow (24 September), Birmingham (25 September), Bristol (10 October/27 January), Liverpool (24 October), Manchester (17 December) and Cambridge (29 January). International performances were programmed as far afield as Brussels, Ljubljana, St Petersburg, Hong Kong and Winnipeg. The United States premiere took place on 20 November 1998 with the Philadelphia Orchestra conducted by Andrew Davis, followed by performances by the Chicago Symphony Orchestra with Davis and the National Symphony Orchestra in Washington with Leonard Slatkin.

== Music ==
The symphony has four movements:

1. Allegro molto maestoso
2. Scherzo: Allegretto
3. Adagio solenne
4. Allegro

=== I. Allegro molto maestoso ===
The symphony opens in a sweeping sequence of parallel open fifths and octaves (the first seventeen bars of which Elgar left in full score) building to a march rhythm. By contrast, the second subject is "sublimely wistful". There is an exposition repeat indicated by Elgar, and a calm new theme for strings introduces the development section, which later has a lively theme for the horns. A march section in B♭ minor follows. After the recapitulation, the coda brings together the main themes and the movement ends with a majestic C-major conclusion based on the opening theme.

The movement, taking about sixteen minutes in performance, though on a large scale, is shorter than the equivalent movements of Elgar's First and Second Symphonies.

=== II. Scherzo: Allegretto ===
The scherzo is in great contrast to those of the first two symphonies, both of which are fast and forceful. It is, however, the movement of which the sketches provided the clearest indications of Elgar's intentions, and the gentle wistfulness is in a recognisable Wand of Youth style. A light dance-tune with a prominent part for the tambourine recurs like a rondo. There are two contrasting episodes, the second of which features an A-major theme in pastoral vein.

=== III. Adagio solenne ===
Elgar wrote that the opening bars of the slow movement would "open some vast bronze doors into something strangely unfamiliar." The first main theme is elegiac, the D major second subject offering gentler contrast. The recapitulation emphasises the brooding first theme, and the movement ends with a single solo viola note, marked fine; "this is the end", Elgar said of this phrase.

=== IV. Allegro ===
The opening of the finale returns to the heroic tone of the start of the symphony with a rousing fanfare (scored by Elgar). It is the movement of which the least original Elgar material exists, and Payne was obliged to contribute a quantity of original music. The martial opening theme has a subsidiary theme in Elgar's nobilmente vein. The climax of the movement is a large-scale crescendo-decrescendo modelled by Payne on "The Wagon Passes" in the Nursery Suite. The hushed ending dies away in a long pianissimo note from the tam tam.

== Recordings ==
The first recording was made for the NMC label by the BBC Symphony Orchestra, conducted by Sir Andrew Davis, in October 1997, four months before the first public performance. Subsequent recordings include:

- Bournemouth Symphony Orchestra, Paul Daniel (2000, Naxos)
- London Symphony Orchestra, Sir Colin Davis (2001, LSO Live)
- BBC National Orchestra of Wales, Richard Hickox (2007, Chandos)
- Sapporo Symphony Orchestra, Tadaaki Otaka (2008, Signum Classics)
- NHK Symphony Orchestra, Tadaaki Otaka (2017, King International)
