= Elgar Society =

Musical society to promote Edward Elgar

The Elgar Society was founded in 1951 to promote performance of the music of British composer Edward Elgar, especially the more rarely performed items. Registered as a charity on 22 January 1988, It is particularly concerned with introducing the composer and his music to younger audiences and, by making grants to appropriate educational activities, to enhance the quality of life of members of the public. It also supports the Elgar Birthplace Museum with an annual grant with the objective of widening accessibility to the location and its contents and encouraging research.

In the 1980s the Society encouraged the making of recordings of works such as The Black Knight which remained unrecorded.

== Organization ==
The current president of the Elgar society is Sir Mark Elder. Previous presidents were Sir Adrian Boult from 1951, Lord Menuhin from 1983 and Richard Hickox from 1999.

There are seven UK Branches organised geographically: Great Western, London, North West, Scotland, Southern, Thames Valley and West Midlands; and a branch in Vancouver, British Columbia, Canada. The creation of a Branch is at the discretion of the Society’s Council and requires substantive evidence from a sufficiently large group of members that there is a reasonable assurance of viability. Branches are required to report periodically to the Council on their activities and submit their annual accounts to the Treasurer.

The society publishes a journal—The Elgar Society Journal—three times a year of Elgar research, and is sold to educational institutions and the general public as well as being sent to members as part of their subscription benefit. There is also a thrice-yearly newsletter sent to members only.

== Elgar Medal ==
Before 2011, The Elgar Medal was awarded only to foreign scholars and musicians who publish or perform, and therefore promote, Elgar’s music abroad. During a concert in Birmingham’s Symphony Hall on 11 December 2008, Steven Halls, Chairman of the Society, presented the medal to Sakari Oramo. The remaining outstanding award, to Vladimir Ashkenazy, presented in 2010. However, in February 2011, the Elgar Medal was presented to Michael Kennedy, CBE, a renowned British journalist, writer, and music critic, for his major contribution to promoting the works of Elgar. 2019 - Anastasia Vedyakova, the first Russian musician was awarded by The Elgar Medal.

=== Recipients ===
List of Elgar Medal recipients
Year	Winner
1992	Jerrold Northrop Moore
1992	Leonard Slatkin
1999	Jerzy Maksymiuk
2000	Tadaaki Otaka
2007	Andrew Litton
2008	Sakari Oramo
2009	Danube Symphony Orchestra
2009	Vladimir Ashkenazy
2011	Michael Kennedy
2011	Anthony Payne
2012	Barry Collett
2012	Jacek Kaspszyk
2012	Sir Colin Davis
2013	Sir Andrew Davis
2013	Sir Mark Elder
2015	Daniel Barenboim
2015	Diana McVeagh
2016	Martin Bird
2017	Teresa Cahill
2017	Alexander Walker
2019	Anastasia Vedyakova
2020	Adrian Brown
2021	Janet Baker
