= Sospiri =

Elgar, opus 70

Edward Elgar in 1917

Sospiri, Op. 70, is an adagio for string orchestra, harp (or piano), and organ (or harmonium) composed by Edward Elgar just before and performed just after the beginning of World War I. Elgar originally intended it for violin and piano, as a companion piece to Salut d'Amour and had in mind the title Soupir d'Amour (French for "Sigh of Love"). While composing it he realised that he was writing something more intense, and so chose an Italian word, sospiri, meaning "sighs".

The work, with a performance time of approximately five minutes, was first performed on 15 August 1914 in the Queen's Hall in London, conducted by Sir Henry Wood.

Sospiri was dedicated to Elgar's long-time friend, the violinist W. H. "Billy" Reed.

== Structure ==
Adagio 4/4 d minor

After the introduction of two bars, a melancholic melody is played by the first violin (Excerpt 1).

Excerpt 1

The other subject is displayed more passionately (Excerpt 2).

Excerpt 2 (Note: A grace note appeared in third bar should be slashed.)

Excerpt 1 reappears, followed by dying end in the harmony of F major.

== Notes and references ==
Notes

== Sources ==
- Score, Elgar: Sospiri, Breitkopf & Härtel, Leipzig, 1914
