= Pamela Willetts =

English musicologist (1929–2019)

- Born: 9 April 1929
- Died: 25 January 2019 (aged 89)

Pamela Joan Willetts FSA (9 April 1929 - 25 January 2019) was an English musicologist and the deputy keeper of manuscripts at the British Museum. She produced the first catalogue since 1816 of the manuscripts in the Society of Antiquaries of London, an organisation of which she was a fellow.

== Selected publications ==
- "The Dohnányi Collection", The British Museum Quarterly, Vol. 25, No. 1/2 (Mar. 1962), pp. 3–11.
- "A reconstructed astronomical manuscript from Christ Church Library, Canterbury" in The British Museum Quarterly, 20.1965, 1/2, pp. 22–30.
- "Musical Connections of Thomas Myriell", Music and Letters, Vol. XLIX, No. 1 (Jan. 1968), pp. 36–42. https://doi.org/10.1093/ml/XLIX.1.36
- The Henry Lawes Manuscript. British Museum, London, 1969.
- "Autographs of Angelo Notari", Music and Letters, Vol. L, No. 1 (Jan. 1969), pp. 124–126. https://doi.org/10.1093/ml/L.1.124
- Beethoven and England: An Account of Sources in the British Museum. British Museum, London, 1970.
- "The seven-branched candlestick as a Psalter illustration", Journal of the Warburg and Courtauld Institutes, Vol. 42. (1979), pp. 213–215.
- Catalogue of the Manuscripts in the Society of Antiquaries of London. D.S. Brewer, 2000. ISBN 978-0859915793
