= Jerrold Northrop Moore =

American-born British musicologist (1934–2024)

Jerrold Northrop Moore (1 March 1934 – 18 May 2024) was an American-born British musicologist, best known for a biography and other writings on the life and music of Sir Edward Elgar. He was also an authority on the history of the gramophone.

== Biography ==
Moore was born on 1 March 1934, in Paterson, New Jersey, and was brought up in the United States. He studied at Yale University, taught at the University of Rochester from 1958 to 1961, and was Curator of Historical Sound Recordings at Yale from 1961 to 1970. He has lived in England since 1970.

Moore died on 18 May 2024, at the age of 90.

== Elgar writings ==
Jerrold Northrop Moore's book Edward Elgar: A Creative Life was published in 1984, has been continuously in print ever since, and along with that by Michael Kennedy is considered one of the two definitive biographies of Elgar.

His other Elgar writings include:

- The Elgar Complete Edition (joint editor)
- An Elgar Discography (1963)
- Elgar: a Life in Photographs (1972–74)
- Elgar on Record (1974)
- Spirit of England: Edward Elgar in his World (1984)
- Elgar and his Publishers: Letters of a Creative Life, Vols. I and II (1987)
- Edward Elgar: the Windflower Letters (1989)
- Edward Elgar: Letters of a Lifetime (1990)
- Elgar: Child of Dreams (2004).

Moore was a recipient of the Elgar Society Medal, the Elgar Society's highest honour, which recognises performers or scholars who have contributed significantly over the previous decade or more to the wider appreciation of Elgar and his music.

== Other ==
Moore's other publications include:

- A Voice in Time: the Gramophone of Fred Gaisberg (1976)
- Music and Friends: Seven Decades of Letters to Adrian Boult (1979)
- Sound Revolutions: A Biography of Fred Gaisberg Founding Father of Commercial Sound Recording (1999)
- F. L. Griggs, 1876–1938: The Architecture of Dreams (2000)
- Vaughan Williams: a Life in Photographs (1992)
- Confederate Commissary General
- Historical sound recordings program at Yale University
- Philharmonic Jubilee 1932-1982
- The Green Fuse: Pastoral Vision in English Art 1820-2000
