= Fred Gaisberg =

American musician and recording engineer

Gaisberg (l) with Sir Edward Elgar and Yehudi Menuhin outside the EMI Abbey Road Studios after the recording of Elgar's Violin Concerto in 1932.

Frederick William Gaisberg (1 January 1873 – 2 September 1951) was an American musician, recording engineer and one of the earliest classical music producers for the gramophone. He did not use the term 'producer', and was not an impresario like his protégé Walter Legge of EMI or an innovator like John Culshaw of Decca. Gaisberg concentrated on talent-scouting and persuading performers to make recordings for the newly invented Gramophone.

Gaisberg began working in the recording industry in America as a young man, becoming a pioneer of early recording, and also worked as piano accompanist for the Berliner Gram-O-Phone Company, the inventors of the practical lateral-groove disc and associated playback apparatus, the Berliner Gramophone. In 1898, he joined the Gramophone Company in England as its first recording engineer. In 1902, he recorded music sung by the tenor Enrico Caruso and the recordings became a sensation. By 1921, Gaisberg was artistic director of His Master's Voice's 'international artistes' department. After 1925, he concentrated on artist management. In 1939, he retired from his position but continued as a consultant in the industry through the 1940s.

== Biography ==
=== Early years ===
Gaisberg was born in Washington, D.C. His father Wilhelm was the son of German immigrants. Gaisberg was educated in Washington and was a chorister at St. John's Episcopal Church.

A musically talented youngster, he encountered the fledgling recording technology in the early 1890s and got a job working for the Berliner Gram-O-Phone Company in America. Poor sound quality and short playing time, however, meant that recordings were more of an amusing novelty than a serious means of reproducing music. In this decade the first of the recording industry's format wars was taking place, with the original cylinder recordings gradually being ousted by the more convenient Berliner flat disc. Gaisberg played an important role in this war, helping to establish 78 revolutions per minute as the standard playing speed and shellac as the standard material for making discs.

=== The Gramophone Company and His Master's Voice ===
In 1898, the Gramophone Company was formed in London. Gaisberg, by then working as piano accompanist and recording supervisor for Emile Berliner, left New York for London to join the Gramophone Company as its first recording engineer. He landed in Liverpool with recording outfit, a bicycle, and introductions and instructions from Berliner. Among his first recordings in London were several made by Syria Lamonte, an Australian singer working at Rules Restaurant in Maiden Lane.

Gaisberg made some of the first recordings of the tenor Enrico Caruso, in Milan on 11 April 1902. The voice recorded well even on the primitive equipment of the time, and the entire enterprise paid off financially as well as artistically. It also sparked a long and happy transatlantic arrangement. In the US the recordings were issued under the label of the Victor Talking Machine Company, spearheading the March 1903 introduction of Victor's new premium Red Seal line. Caruso moved to the U.S. later in 1903, and recorded exclusively for Victor the rest of his life. Many of those Victor recordings, issued in the UK under the Gramophone Company's label and in continental Europe under the labels of its several sister companies, were even more popular and profitable. Caruso himself said, "My Victor records will be my biography."

Gaisberg's brother William worked with him. They signed up and/or recorded such international stars as Adelina Patti, Francesco Tamagno, Feodor Chaliapin, Beniamino Gigli, Nellie Melba, John McCormack and Fritz Kreisler. Gaisberg was the only record producer to record a castrato singer (Alessandro Moreschi of the Sistine Chapel choir), and the first person to produce recordings in India and Japan. He cut India's first gramophone recordings, which featured Gauhar Jaan singing a khayal, on 2 November 1902. These sessions took place in a makeshift studio rigged up in two rooms of a Calcutta hotel. In Japan, he recorded more than 270 titles in one single month of 1903. Gaisberg made a number of trips to pre-Revolutionary Russia, where his recordings helped develop one of recorded music's largest early markets. He made the first recordings of the Russian tenor Vladimir Rosing.

Unlike his successors Legge and Culshaw, Gaisberg did not generally regard it as part of his function to influence the way performers performed. He found the best artists he could, signed them up and faithfully captured their performances on disc in the best possible sound available at the time of recording. He told a colleague that he saw his task simply as one of making as many sound photographs or gramophone (78-rpm) disc sides as possible during each recording session.

=== Later years ===
In 1921, Gaisberg became His Master's Voice's artistic director in the newly formed 'international artistes' department. After the introduction of electrical (microphone) recording in 1925, he delegated the role of producer and concentrated on artist-and-repertoire management. He remained as artistic director after the His Master's Voice and Columbia firms merged in 1931, creating Electric and Musical Industries (EMI). The recordings made under his supervision include Sir Edward Elgar's series of records of his symphonies, concertos and other major works. With Bernard Shaw, the BBC and others, Gaisberg was partly responsible for persuading Elgar to write a third symphony, although he died before he could complete any more than initial sketches. (They were eventually "elaborated" into a symphonic shape by the composer Anthony Payne four decades later.)

Gaisberg refused offers of a directorship at His Master's Voice, preferring to remain a link between the artists and the company. At age 66, in 1939, he retired but continued on as a consultant at EMI, exerting considerable influence on the recording industry. In the late 1940s he argued in favour of long-play (LP) records, introduced by Columbia Records in 1948, and stereophonic recording, introduced in 1958 after his death. One of his last projects, in the early 1930s, was to conceive, and supervise the construction of, a major facility for classical recording, Abbey Road Studios.

A banquet was given at the Savoy Hotel to mark his retirement. It was attended by renowned musicians as diverse as Sir Thomas Beecham, Gracie Fields, Richard Tauber and Artur Rubinstein. Gaisberg retained his American citizenship to the end, and was a lifelong bachelor. He died at his home in Hampstead in 1951 at age 78, and was buried in Hampstead Cemetery in West Hampstead.
