= August Jaeger =

Anglo-German music publisher and friend of Edward Elgar

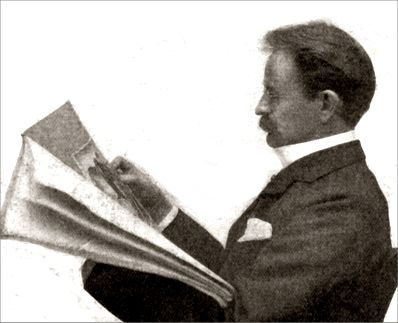
Jaeger in his later years

August Johannes Jaeger (18 March 1860 – 18 May 1909) was a German-born British music publisher, who developed a close friendship with the English composer Edward Elgar. He offered advice and help to Elgar and is immortalised in the Enigma Variations.

== Early life ==
Jaeger was born in Düsseldorf, Germany (then the Kingdom of Prussia). He was the son of Gottfrid Jaeger (1821–1880) and Carolina Obenstintenberg (1826–1910). His brother was Wilhelm Jaeger (9 February 1862 – 15 December 1934), who died at 205 Shirland Road in London. Wilhelm married Caroline Haarer (1869–1917), and had three children

- Harold George Jaeger (1903–1984)
- Katie Dorothy Jaeger (1899 in Islington –)
- William Percy Jaeger (1895–1969)

== Career ==
He came to London in 1878, where he first worked at a map-printing firm.

In 1890 he joined the London music publishing company Novello as a music reader. He became head of the publishing office.

Edward Elgar's relationship with Jaeger is documented in Percy M. Young's book showing eleven years of correspondence, Letters to Nimrod. Jaeger met Edward Elgar in late 1897, when he was publishing office manager at Novellos, and their first correspondence was regarding the publication of Elgar's Te Deum and Benedictus. His advice, friendship and encouragement became invaluable to Elgar, for example causing the composer to rework many famous musical passages, including the finale to his Variations on an Original Theme (Enigma Variations) and the climax of The Dream of Gerontius. Jaeger has been immortalized in the famous ninth variation "Nimrod" from the Variations, recalling a conversation on the slow movements of Beethoven (Nimrod was a Biblical hunter, a pun on the German word for hunter, Jäger).

Jaeger championed the work of the young composer Samuel Coleridge-Taylor, claiming to Elgar that Coleridge-Taylor was "a genius".

== Personal life ==
In 1898 Jaeger married Isabella Donkersley (1864–1938) of Magdale, Honley near Holmfirth in West Yorkshire, an accomplished violinist and pupil of Henry Holmes in the Royal College of Music, on 22 December 1898 at St Mary Abbots in London. They had two children, including Mary Jaeger (26 April 1900 – September 1991, East Sussex).

At the beginning of 1905 Jaeger was ill with tuberculosis and went to Davos in Switzerland, but he was still receiving a pension from Novellos. After the long and depressing illness, during which he and Elgar still corresponded about musical matters, Jaeger died in Muswell Hill on 18 May 1909 aged 49.

The family later changed their name to the anglicized "Hunter" after World War I. Isabella Hunter died on 9 October 1938, at her daughter's house, in North Finchley.

== Works ==
- Analytical and descriptive notes for works by Elgar: The Apostles (1903); The Dream of Gerontius (1904); The Kingdom (1906); Falstaff
- Notes for Queens Hall concert programmes (1903–1906)

== Bibliography ==
- Elgar, Edward (24 October 1898). "Letter from Elgar to Jaeger (1898)". Letter to August Jaeger. British Library.
- Kennedy, Michael (1970). Elgar: Orchestral Music. London: BBC. OCLC 252020259.
- Kennedy, Michael (1985). The Oxford Dictionary of Music. Oxford University Press. ISBN 0-19-311333-3.
- Self, Geoffrey (1995). The Hiawatha Man. Scolar Press. ISBN 0-85967-983-7.
- Young, Percy M., ed. (1965). Letters to Nimrod. London: Dobson Books Ltd.
