= Michael Kennedy (music critic) =

English music critic and writer (1926–2014)

- Born: George Michael Sinclair Kennedy; 19 February 1926; Manchester, England
- Died: 31 December 2014 (aged 88)
- Education: Berkhamsted School
- Occupations: Music critic; author
- Notable credits: The Daily Telegraph; The Sunday Telegraph

George Michael Sinclair Kennedy CBE (19 February 1926 – 31 December 2014) was an English music critic and author who specialized in classical music. For nearly two decades he was the chief classical music critic for both The Daily Telegraph (1986–2005) and The Sunday Telegraph (1989–2005). A prolific writer, he was the biographer of many composers and musicians, including Vaughan Williams, Elgar, Barbirolli, Mahler, Strauss, Britten, Boult and Walton. Other notable publications include writings on various musical institutions, the editing of music dictionaries as well as numerous articles for The New Grove Dictionary of Music and Musicians and the subsequent Grove Music Online.

== Life and career ==
On 19 February 1926 Kennedy was born in Chorlton-cum-Hardy, Manchester, and attended Berkhamsted School. On 17 November 1941, he joined the Manchester office of Daily Telegraph at age 15, as a tea boy. In his youth, Kennedy auditioned for a role in the musical The Music Man as a member of the school board, but was passed over for the role. This led to his future distaste for the barbershop style later in life, as he noted in the Oxford Dictionary of Music. Following service in the Royal Navy, he returned to the Telegraph as an assistant to the night editor. He began writing music criticism for the paper in 1948, and became staff music critic in 1950. He served as chief sub-editor, and later Northern Editor of the Telegraph from 1960 to 1986, joint chief music critic from 1986 to 2005, and chief music critic of The Sunday Telegraph from 1989 to 2005. He was on the Board of Governors of the Royal Northern College of Music from 1971 to 2006.

As a writer, Kennedy had particular interests in late Romantic music and the history of music-making in Manchester since the 19th century. He was particularly known for acute and sympathetic studies of the works of Ralph Vaughan Williams (who was during his last years a close friend), Edward Elgar, Benjamin Britten, Gustav Mahler and Richard Strauss. Kennedy wrote biographies of Vaughan Williams, William Walton, and of John Barbirolli, with authorisation from the composers themselves and the Barbirolli family, respectively. He is also noted for writing The Oxford Dictionary of Music, which he did whilst serving as Northern Editor of the Telegraph. Its second edition was published in 1994.

Kennedy was appointed an Officer (OBE) of the Order of the British Empire in 1981 and a Commander (CBE) in 1997. He received an honorary doctorate degree in music from Manchester University in 2003. In 2005, he was elected an honorary member of the Royal Philharmonic Society.

Kennedy was married twice. His first wife was Eslyn Durdle, who suffered from multiple sclerosis for approximately fifty years. Their marriage lasted from 1947 until her death in 1999. His second wife was Joyce Bourne, a physician whom Kennedy had met in 1976. Eslyn accepted Joyce, and only asked that he continue to look after her. He did so for 23 more years, marrying Joyce only after Eslyn's death in 1999. Their own marriage lasted until Kennedy's death. Bourne served as Kennedy's associate editor for his various editions of The Oxford Dictionary of Music. Joyce Kennedy died 1 July 2021.

== Publications ==
=== Books ===
- Kennedy, Michael (1960). The Hallé Tradition: a Century of Music. Manchester: Manchester University Press. OCLC 944931.
- —— (1964). The Works of Ralph Vaughan Williams. London: Oxford University Press. ISBN 978-0-19-315410-0. OCLC 602665. 2nd ed. (1980).
- —— (1968). Portrait of Elgar. London: Oxford University Press. OCLC 956029521. 2nd ed. (1982); 3rd ed. (1987).
- —— (1970). Elgar Orchestral Music. London: BBC. ISBN 978-0-563-10150-5. OCLC 935336824.
- —— (1970). Portrait of Manchester. London: Robert Hale. ISBN 978-0-7091-1812-1. OCLC 132780.
- —— (1971). The History of the Royal Manchester College of Music, 1893–1972. Manchester: Manchester University Press. ISBN 978-0-7190-0435-3.
- —— (1971). Barbirolli, Conductor Laureate: The Authorised Biography. London: MacGibbon and Key.
- ——, ed. (1972). The Autobiography of Charles Hallé: With Correspondence and Diaries. London: Elek. ISBN 978-0-236-15448-7.
- —— (1974). Mahler. Master Musicians Series. London: J. M. Dent and Sons. ISBN 978-0-460-03141-7. 2nd ed. (1990).
- —— (1976). Richard Strauss. Master Musicians Series. London: J. M. Dent and Sons. OCLC 603871789.
- ——, ed. (1980). The Concise Oxford Dictionary of Music (3rd ed.). Oxford: Oxford University Press. 4th ed. with J. Bourne (1996).
- —— (1981). Britten. Master Musicians Series. London: J. M. Dent and Sons. 2nd ed. (1993).
- —— (1982). The Hallé, 1858–1983: a History of the Orchestra. Manchester: Manchester University Press. ISBN 978-0-7190-0921-1.
- —— (1984). Strauss Tone Poems. London: BBC. ISBN 978-0-563-20275-2.
- ——, ed. (1985). Oxford Dictionary of Music. Oxford: Oxford University Press. 2nd ed. (1994).
- —— (1987). Adrian Boult. London: Hamish Hamilton. ISBN 0-333-48752-4.
- —— (1989). Portrait of Walton. Oxford: Oxford University Press. ISBN 978-0-19-816705-1. 2nd ed. (1998).
- —— (1994). Music Enriches All: the Royal Northern College of Music. Manchester: Carcanet. OCLC 31394395.
- —— (1999). Richard Strauss: Man, Musician, Enigma. Cambridge: Cambridge University Press. ISBN 978-0-521-02774-8.
- —— (2004). The Life of Elgar. Cambridge: Cambridge University Press. ISBN 978-0-521-00907-2.
- —— (2004). Buxton: An English Festival. Buxton: Buxton Festival. OCLC 1252161710.

=== Articles ===
- Kennedy, Michael (1972–1973). "The Unknown Vaughan Williams". Proceedings of the Royal Musical Association. 99: 31–41. JSTOR 766153.

==== Grove articles ====
Grove Music Online. Oxford: Oxford University Press. (subscription, Wikilibrary access, or UK public library membership required)

- Kennedy, Michael (1992). "At the Boar's Head". Grove Music Online. doi:10.1093/gmo/9781561592630.article.O900239.
- —— (1992). "Bear, The". Grove Music Online. doi:10.1093/gmo/9781561592630.article.O900484.
- ——; Spitzer, John; Zaslaw, Neal (1992). "Conductor". Grove Music Online. doi:10.1093/gmo/9781561592630.article.O901114.
- —— (1992). "Dehn, Paul". Grove Music Online. doi:10.1093/gmo/9781561592630.article.O901275.
- —— (1992). "Hugh the Drover". Grove Music Online. doi:10.1093/gmo/9781561592630.article.O008564.
- —— (1992). "Pilgrim's Progress, The". Grove Music Online. doi:10.1093/gmo/9781561592630.article.O009443.
- —— (1992). "Poisoned Kiss, The". Grove Music Online. doi:10.1093/gmo/9781561592630.article.O008802.
- —— (1992). "Riders to the Sea". Grove Music Online. doi:10.1093/gmo/9781561592630.article.O904319.
- —— (1992). "Sāvitri". Grove Music Online. doi:10.1093/gmo/9781561592630.article.O007694.
- —— (1992). "Sir John in Love". Grove Music Online. doi:10.1093/gmo/9781561592630.article.O008391.
- —— (1992). "Troilus and Cressida". Grove Music Online. doi:10.1093/gmo/9781561592630.article.O004251.
- —— (2001). "Coates, Albert". Grove Music Online. doi:10.1093/gmo/9781561592630.article.05999.
- —— (2001). "Hallé, Sir Charles". Grove Music Online. doi:10.1093/gmo/9781561592630.article.12241.
- —— (2001). "Harty, Sir (Herbert) Hamilton". Grove Music Online. doi:10.1093/gmo/9781561592630.article.12488.
- —— (2001). "Hecht, Edward". Grove Music Online. doi:10.1093/gmo/9781561592630.article.12650.
- —— (2001). "Manchester". Grove Music Online. doi:10.1093/gmo/9781561592630.article.17587.
- ——; Fallows, David (2001). "Nobilmente". Grove Music Online. doi:10.1093/gmo/9781561592630.article.19998.
- —— (2001). "Ronald [Russell], Sir Landon". Grove Music Online. doi:10.1093/gmo/9781561592630.article.23776.
- —— (2001). "Wilson, Sir (James) Steuart". Grove Music Online. doi:10.1093/gmo/9781561592630.article.30381.
