= The Light of Life (Elgar) =

Cover of full score, 1908

The Light of Life, op 29, also known as Lux Christi (The Light of Christ), is a short oratorio with music by Edward Elgar for soprano, contralto, tenor and baritone soloists with chorus and orchestra, composed and first performed in 1896. The work is based on the story of Jesus's miracle in giving sight to a blind man, as told in St John's Gospel in the New Testament. The libretto was written by the Rev Edward Capel-Cure. The Light of Life was composed for the Three Choirs Festival at Worcester in 1896.

== Background ==
Elgar was a largely self-taught composer with no influential patrons or sponsors and from the 1870s to the late 1890s he struggled for artistic recognition and financial success. He supplemented the modest income from his early compositions by giving violin lessons. By 1896 his compositions included the concert overture Froissart, a Serenade for Strings and The Black Knight, a symphony for chorus and orchestra completed and premiered in 1893.

Lux Christi as a subject, was suggested by the Rev Edward Capel-Cure, who, while a curate in Worcester, played chamber music with Elgar. He constructed the libretto, which uses direct quotations from St John's Gospel, interspersed with original stanzas to give the composer more scope for musical set pieces. Elgar's publishers, Novello and Co, agreed to publish the work but asked that asked that it be kept to less than an hour in length. The working title of the piece – Lux Christi – troubled them: to some in Britain a Latin title carried unwelcome suggestions of Roman Catholicism. Elgar suggested the title The Light that Shineth, but accepted Novello's suggestion of The Light of Life. The piece retells the gospel story of Christ's giving sight to a young man born blind and the condemnation of him by the Pharisees for doing so on the Sabbath.

== Premiere ==
The work was premiered in Worcester Cathedral on 8 September 1896. The soloists were Anna Williams, Jessie King, Watkin Mills and Edward Lloyd. The composer conducted. The dedicatee was Charles Swinnerton Heap.

== Work ==
The piece is scored for 2 flutes (one doubling piccolo), 2 oboes, 2 clarinets, 2 bassoons, contrabassoon, 4 horns, 2 trumpets. 3 trombones, tuba, 2 timpani, cymbals, harp, organ and strings.

The four soloists are assigned roles in the narrative: the contralto is the narrator; Jesus is sung by the baritone, the blind man by the tenor and the blind man's mother by the soprano.

=== Numbers ===
Source: full score

- Meditation (Orchestra)
- Chorus (Levites) and Solo (Tenor) – "Seek Him that maketh the seven stars"
- Recit (Contralto) and Chorus (Disciples) – "As Jesus passed by"
- Solo (Soprano) – "Be not extreme, O Lord"
- Solo (Baritone) – "Neither hath this man sinned"
- Chorus – "Light out of darkness"
- Recit (Contralto and Baritone) – "And when He had thus spoken"
- Chorus or Duet (Soprano and Contralto) – "Doubt not thy Father's care"
- Soli (Contralto and Tenor) and Chorus – "He went his way therefore"
- Solo (Tenor) – "As a spirit didst Thou pass before mine eyes"
- Recit (Contralto) and Chorus – "They brought him to the Pharisees"
- Solo (Contralto) – "Thou only hast the words of life"
- Recit (Soprano, Contralto and Tenor) and Chorus – "But the Jews did not believe"
- Solo (Soprano) and Chorus of Women – "Woe to the shepherds of the flock"
- Recit (Contralto, Tenor and Baritone) – "Jesus heard that they had cast him out
- Solo (Baritone) – "I am the Good Shepherd "
- Chorus – "Light of the World, we know Thy praise"

== Critical reception ==
The work was well received at its premiere. One music critic wrote:

the feature of the week has been the production of Mr Edward Elgar's Light of Life. That a comparatively young and untried man should come forward with a work of such strength and suggestiveness as this is surely a most hopeful sign for British art. … Some critics have ventured an opinion that the Worcester musician's talents will be best revealed in a secular direction; but whilst there is much force in this suggestion, there can be little doubt that Mr Elgar's powers qualify him to shine in other ways than one.

The same critic commented that Elgar's principal musical influence so far seemed to be Wagner but that The Light of Life also revealed an assimilation of the styles of Gounod, Dvořák and Mendelssohn, "together, with an underlying individuality of his own that Mr Elgar may he trusted to develop".

In a 21st-century assessment, Robin Holloway writes of the work:

The verse is certainly fustian, but the trajectory is sure, and the message profound. The immediately striking advance is an enrichment of harmonic range, orchestral elaboration, and wide-spreading continuity of the sixteen numbers.

== Recordings ==
WorldCat (2026) lists two complete recordings of The Light of Life. The first, conducted by Sir Charles Groves in July 1980, features the Royal Liverpool Philharmonic Choir and Royal Liverpool Philharmonic Orchestra with the soloists Margaret Marshall, Helen Watts, Robin Leggate, and John Shirley-Quirk. The second was first issued in 1993. Richard Hickox conducts the London Symphony Chorus, the London Symphony Orchestra and the soloists Judith Howarth, Linda Finnie, Arthur Davies and John Shirley-Quirk. The composer recorded the opening Meditation as a stand-alone piece in April 1925. Groves and the Royal Liverpool Philharmonic (1971), and Sir Adrian Boult and the London Philharmonic Orchestra (1975) also recorded stand-alone versions of the Meditation.

== Sources ==
- Elgar, Edward (1908). The Light of Life (Lux Christi) – A Short Oratorio for Soli, Chorus, and Orchestra, Op. 29. London: Novello. OCLC 1048310582.
- Holloway, Robin (2004). "The Early Choral Works". In Daniel M. Grimley; Julian Rushton (eds.). The Cambridge Companion to Elgar. Cambridge and New York: Cambridge University Press. ISBN 0-521-53363-5.
- Kennedy, Michael (1987). Portrait of Elgar (Third ed.). Oxford: Clarendon Press. ISBN 0-19-284017-7.
- Young, Percy M. (1973). Elgar O. M.: A Study of a Musician. London: Collins. OCLC 869820.
