= William Stockley's Orchestra =

Symphony orchestra based in Birmingham, England

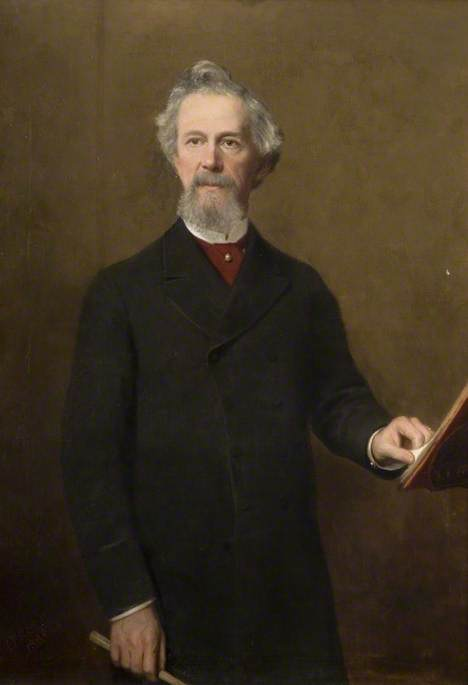
William Stockley

William Stockley's Orchestra was a symphony orchestra based in Birmingham, England from 1856 to 1899. It was the first permanent orchestra formed of local musicians to be established in the town, in contrast to the earlier Birmingham Festival Orchestra, which consisted largely of outside musicians and only performed during the Birmingham Triennial Music Festival.

By 1885 the orchestra was being described in the London press as "a really first-rate band of 80 skilled players" and notable conductors included Frederic Cowen, Charles Villiers Stanford and Antonín Dvořák.

The composer Edward Elgar was employed as a violinist in the orchestra between 1882 and 1889. In 1883 the orchestra performed his Intermezzo moresque at Birmingham Town Hall, the first public performance by a professional orchestra of any Elgar composition.

== History ==
=== Foundation ===
The orchestra was founded by William Stockley in 1856 to support the Birmingham Festival Choral Society, to which Stockley had been appointed conductor the previous year. Dissatisfied with the organ accompaniment to his first performance of Handel's Messiah he suggested setting up a regular orchestra to accompany the choir, a proposal that an alarmed Choral Society committee passed by a majority of only four votes. Stockley immediately started recruiting musicians, later remembering how "as there were but few instrumentalists in the town, and those principally engaged at the Theatre Royal and the music hall, my task was a difficult one." The financial risk of promoting orchestral concerts was initially shared between the Festival Choral Society and the musicians, with the society agreeing to give two thirds of the profit from an experimental first concert to the players. This arrangement continued for the first two years until 1858, when the increasing success and prosperity of the enterprise allowed the orchestra to provide a pre-arranged fee.

=== Subscription concerts ===
Despite the success of the orchestra its purpose until 1873 was still primarily to support the Festival Choral Society, whose standards Stockley improved to the point where in 1861 The Times declared them to be the "Champion Choristers of England" and in 1879 the composer Camille Saint-Saëns could describe how they "perform as if they were the finest musicians in the world". In 1873, however, Stockley noted that "the singing of the choristers was considered to be much more advanced than the playing of the instrumentalists, and this was to be expected, inasmuch as the rehearsals for the choir were continuous, while the opportunities of the band were very limited." To improve this situation and "give the gentlemen of the band the opportunity of gaining greater proficiency" he instigated a series of "Subscription Orchestral Concerts" at Birmingham Town Hall, independent of the Festival Choral Society, for which it was announced:

Each concert will comprise a SYMPHONY and other compositions of GREAT MASTERS and will be interspersed with VOCAL MUSIC, for which at least one Artiste of eminence will be engaged. The accompaniments will, as far as practicable, be ORCHESTRAL or with OBBLIGATI for Solo Instruments.

The first subscription season saw Stockley incur a financial loss of £100, but a society was formed by prominent local figures to provide financial support and guarantee continuation of the series in subsequent years. By 1885 the London-based Musical Times could describe the orchestra as "a really first-rate band of 80 skilled players" who achieved "a unity, precision, and perfect balance of parts which any Metropolitan organisation would envy".

The orchestra developed an extensive repertoire: records show that its programmes included a total of 35 symphonies, 27 concertos, 55 overtures and between 50 and 60 orchestral suites. Guest conductors included Frederic Cowen, who conducted a performance of his own works in 1883; Charles Villiers Stanford, who conducted one of his own symphonies in 1887; and Antonín Dvořák, who appeared in 1886 conducting his own D Major Symphony. The orchestra also gave many opportunities to contemporary local composers, including Francis Edward Bache, whose Romance was performed in 1874; Frederick Bridge, whose Cantata was performed in 1885; and Herbert Wareing, who had an overture performed in 1886.

=== Elgar ===
The composer Edward Elgar played violin in Stockley's Orchestra for seven years from 1882 to 1889, seeking more professional experience than was available in his native Worcester. His first concert was on 30 November 1882 at Birmingham Town Hall, where he took part in a performance of a suite from Delibes' ballet Sylvia. He would perform in every concert the orchestra played from then until his final performance on 7 November 1889. His intensive participation in these concerts would give him insights into classical and romantic instrumentation that could not have been otherwise obtained and he would later declare "I shall always cherish my associations with Birmingham, where I have learned all the music I know when a member of Mr Stockley's orchestra".

Stockley was initially unaware of Elgar's own compositions, but in 1883 the composer Herbert Wareing recommended them to him and showed him the score of Elgar's recently completed Intermezzo moresque, his first composition for full orchestra. Stockley "at once recognised its merit" and offered to perform it with the orchestra. This professional premiere of Elgar's first publicly performed orchestral work took place on 13 December 1883 and attracted national attention. Stockley later recalled "On my asking him if he'd like to conduct, he declined, and, further, insisted on playing in his place in the orchestra. The consequence was that he had to appear, fiddle in hand, to acknowledge the genuine and hearty applause of the audience"

Further performances of Elgar's works took place over subsequent years. His 1884 work Sevillana – dedicated to Stockley but first performed by August Manns in London – was performed by Stockley's Orchestra in Birmingham in February 1885; and in February 1888 Elgar himself conducted the orchestra in a performance of his Suite in D. In September 1890 Stockley conducted the orchestra in a performance of Elgar's Froissart Overture three days after its Worcester premiere and ten years before it would be performed in London. Elgar's wife Alice recorded in the programme notes: "E. called and applauded onto the platform. A. very proud." No more performances of Elgar's works were given after the composer left the orchestra in 1889, however, and the orchestra had disbanded by the time Elgar's first acknowledged masterpiece, the Enigma Variations, was published in 1899.

=== Dissolution ===
By the mid 1890s the ageing Stockley was beginning to seem outdated and his limitations were becoming obvious. The orchestra in turn started to attract adverse comment for its archaic instrumentation and "lack of players of reputation". In 1897 a syndicate of influential local citizens was set up to support the establishment of George Halford's Orchestra, which would be Birmingham's leading orchestra for most of the next decade. Stockley was advised by his friends to retire instead of face a likely financial loss and he conducted the orchestra for the last time on 11 March 1897.

The orchestra resumed performances in December 1897 under the baton of Rowland Winn (1856–1924), who had been Stockley's pianist and amanuensis, but who lacked his predecessor's charisma. Although the series attracted notable soloists, including Vladimir de Pachmann and David Ffrangcon-Davies, it suffered poor attendances in the face of competition from Halford's new venture and from a series of orchestral concerts promoted by the Festival Choral Society under Charles Swinnerton Heap. After two further seasons the orchestra dissolved in 1899.

== Bibliography ==
- Handford, Margaret (2006), Sounds Unlikely: Music in Birmingham, Studley: Brewin Books, ISBN 1858582873
- Harlow, Martin (1999), "Mr Halford's Orchestral Concerts 1897–1907. Conductor at Large.", The Musical Times, 140 (1867), Musical Times Publications Ltd.: 49–53, doi:10.2307/1193895, JSTOR 1193895
- King-Smith, Beresford (1995), Crescendo! 75 years of the City of Birmingham Symphony Orchestra, London: Methuen, ISBN 0413697401
- Moore, Jerrold Northrop (1999), Edward Elgar: A Creative Life, Oxford: Oxford University Press, ISBN 0198163665
- Young, Percy M. (1995), Elgar, Newman, and The Dream of Gerontius: In The Tradition of English Catholicism, Aldershot: Scolar Press, ISBN 0859678776
