= Alice Mary Smith =

English composer (1839–1884)

- Born: 19 May 1839; London, England
- Died: 4 December 1884 (aged 45); London, England
- Occupation: Composer

Alice Mary Smith (married name Alice Mary Meadows White; 19 May 1839 – 4 December 1884) was an English composer. Her compositions included two symphonies and a large collection of choral works, both sacred and secular.

== Biography ==
Smith was born in London, the third child of a relatively well-to-do family. She showed aptitude for music from her early years and took lessons privately from William Sterndale Bennett and George Alexander Macfarren, publishing her first song in 1857. In November 1867, the year of her marriage to a lawyer, Frederick Meadows White, she was elected Female Professional Associate of the Royal Philharmonic Society. In 1884 she was elected an honorary member of the Royal Academy of Music. The same year, after a period of illness in which she went abroad to try to recover, she died of typhoid fever in London and was buried in Highgate Cemetery.

== Music ==
Smith was a prolific composer, writing for a diverse range of ensembles.

Among her chamber compositions are four piano quartets, three string quartets and a clarinet sonata (1870), perhaps the first British example, anticipating sonatas by Swinnerton Heap, Prout, Tovey and Stanford. Her orchestral compositions include six concert overtures and two symphonies. Her first symphony, in C minor, was written at the age of 24 and performed by the Musical Society of London in 1863; the second, in A minor, was written for the Alexandra Palace competition of 1876, but was never submitted.

Smith composed two large pieces for the stage: an operetta, Gisela of Rüdesheim for chorus, orchestra, and soloists which was performed in 1865 at the Fitzwilliam Music Society, Cambridge, and The Masque of Pandora (1875), for which the orchestration was never completed.

Smith's oeuvre includes one of the largest collections of sacred choral music by a woman composer, and comprises six anthems, three canticles (and the beginning to a fourth), as well as a short Sacred Cantata Exile, based on episodes from Jean Racine's Esther. Her anthems Whoso hath this world's goods and By the waters of Babylon were performed in a liturgical context at St Andrew's, Wells Street by Sir Joseph Barnby in February 1864, making them the first recorded instance of music by a woman composer to be used for the liturgies of the Church of England. (Note: But note the competing claim for Clara Angela Macirone's Te Deum and Jubilate)

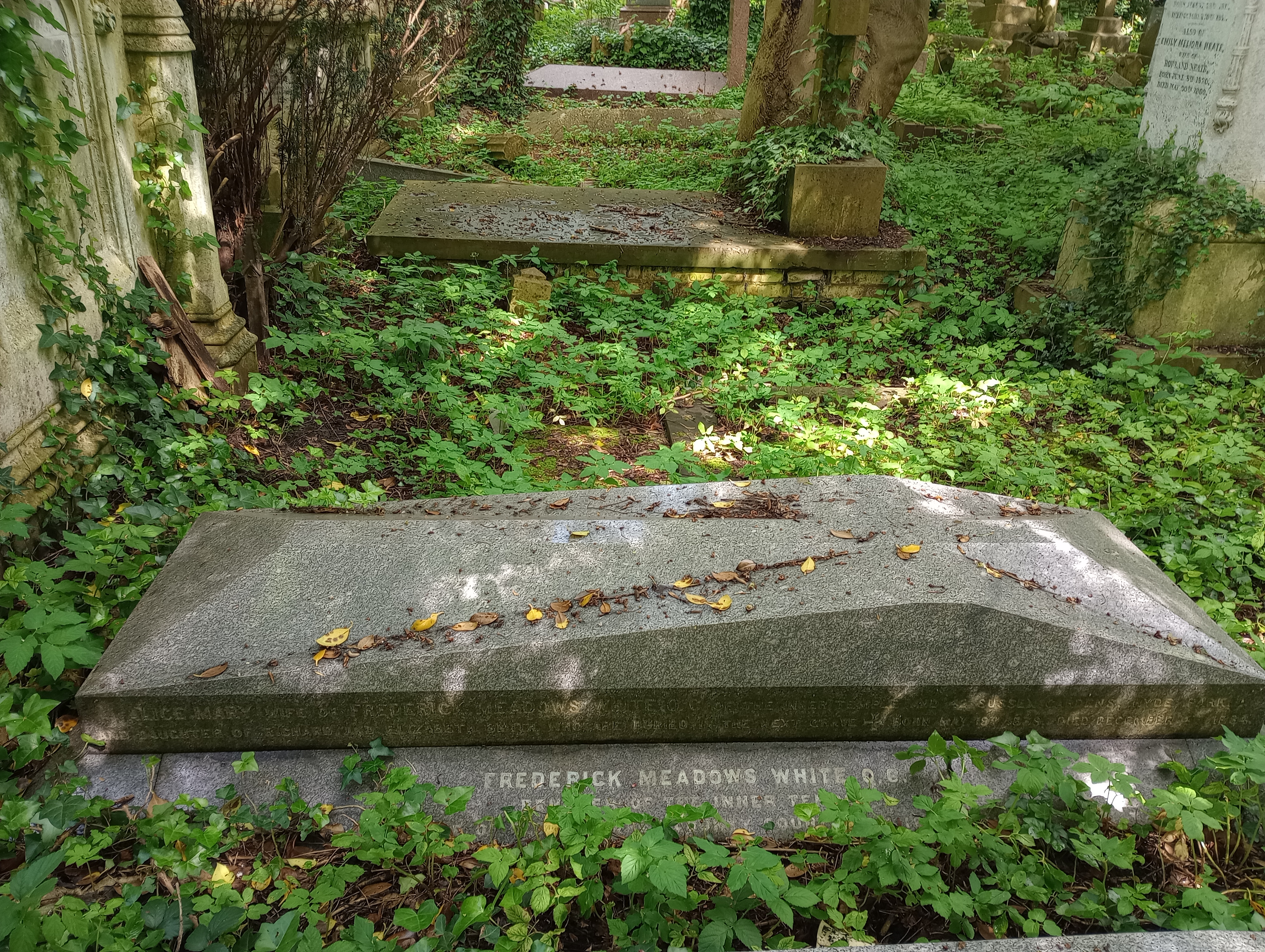
Grave of Alice Mary Smith (married surname White) in Highgate West Cemetery

In 1880, she turned her attention towards writing large-scale cantatas, all published by Novello & Co. These included Ode to the North-East Wind for chorus and orchestra, Ode to The Passions (1882), her longest work, performed at the Three Choirs Festival in Hereford in that year, and two cantatas for male voices in the last two years of her life. In her obituary, her husband claimed that she was working on a setting of the poem The Valley of Remorse by Louisa Sarah Bevington for chorus, soloists and orchestra; however, there is no manuscript to support this claim. Of her forty songs, her most popular work was the vocal duet O that we two were maying. Another, Lessons of the Gorses (setting Elizabeth Barrett Browning), was published in The Girl's Own Paper in 1883.

Since 2010, Smith's manuscripts are housed in the Royal Academy of Music Library. Two symphonies and two overtures are published by A-R Editions in editions by Ian Graham-Jones. The Symphony in A minor, Symphony in C minor and the Andante for clarinet and orchestra (taken from the Clarinet Sonata) have been recorded by Howard Shelley and the London Mozart Players for Chandos. Leonard Sanderman edited the complete sacred choral music of Alice Mary Smith, and recorded this repertoire with The Eoferwic Consort, supported by an AHRC Knowledge Exchange Grant.

According to an obituary in The Athenaeum of 13 December 1884: "Her music is marked by elegance and grace ... power and energy. Her forms were always clear and her ideas free from eccentricity; her sympathies were evidently with the Classic rather than with the Romantic school."

== Selected works ==
=== Stage works ===
- Gisela of Rüdesheim, Operetta, IAS 2 (1865)

=== Orchestral ===
- Symphony No. 1 in C minor, IAS 10 (1863)
- Overture Endymion, IAS 5 (1864)
- Overture Lalla Rookh, IAS 6 (1865)
- Overture Viven, IAS 7 (1865)
- Symphony No. 2 in A minor, IAS 11 (1876)
- Overture Jason, or The Argonauts and the Sirens (1879)

=== Concertante ===
- Introduction and Allegro for Piano and Orchestra in C minor, IAS 9 (1865)
- Andante for Clarinet and Orchestra in D major, IAS 3 (c. 1870) (adapted from the slow movement of the clarinet sonata)

=== Orchestra and chorus ===
- The Masque of Pandora (1875)
- Ode to the North-East Wind, IAS 14 (1880)
- The Passions (1882)
- Song of the Little Baltung (AD 395), choral ballad (1883)
- The Red King (Kingsley), choral ballad (1885)
- The Valley of Remorse, cantata

=== Chamber music ===
- Piano Quartet No. 1 in B♭ (1861)
- String Quartet No. 1 in D (1861)
- String Quartet No. 2, Jubal Cain (1861)
- Piano Trio in G major (1862)
- Piano Quartet No. 2 in E major
- String Quartet No. 3
- Piano Quartet No. 3 in D (1864)
- Piano Quartet No. 4 in G minor (1867)
- Melody and Scherzo for Violin and Piano (1869)
- Clarinet Sonata in A major (1870)

=== Piano ===
- 6 Short Pieces, IAS 12
- Vale of Tempe, Rondo in E♭ major, IAS 13 (c. 1860s)

=== Vocal ===
- Maying, IAS 1 (1891)
- O that We Two Were Maying, IAS 4
- Venus' Looking Glass, for mixed chorus, IAS 8
- Exile, based on episodes from Jean Racine's Esther
- Who so hath this world's goods (1864)
- 4 Anthems
- By the waters of Babylon
- Come unto him
- Out of the deep
- The Soul's Longing
