= William Stockley (musician) =

English organist, choirmaster and conductor

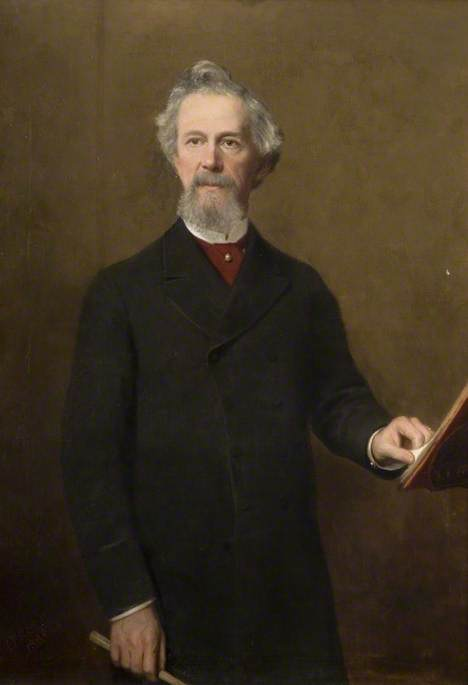
William Stockley

William Cole Stockley (1 February 1830 – 7 September 1919) was an English organist, choirmaster and conductor.

Born in Foots Cray in Kent, Stockley moved to Birmingham in 1850 where he worked first as a "pianoforte and music dealer" and then as an organist at St Stephen's Church, Newtown Row in Lozells. While at St. Stephen's he formed a choral society whose success earned him the position of conductor at the Birmingham Festival Choral Society on the retirement of James Stimpson in 1855. Stockley had a transformative effect on the Society, increasing membership from 70 in 1855 to 200 in 1859 moving the choir into more adventurous repertoire, and inviting performances from more prestigious soloists. In 1861 The Times described Stockley's choir as "the champion choristers of England" and in 1879 the composer Camille Saint-Saëns wrote in a French newspaper "I wish people who describe the English as unmusical could hear the Birmingham singers. This wonderful choir has everything: intonation, perfect timing and rhythm, finely shaded expression and a lovely sound. If people who sing like this are not musical, well, they certainly perform as if they were the finest musicians in the world."

In 1856 he formed William Stockley's Orchestra, the first permanent professional orchestra made up of local musicians to be established in Birmingham, and an important precursor of the later City of Birmingham Symphony Orchestra. Between 1886 and 1900 he was the first Principal of the School of Music at the Birmingham and Midland Institute, which would later become the Royal Birmingham Conservatoire.

Stockley retired in 1897 by which time he was seeming increasingly outdated. In 1900 he was brought out of retirement to replace his successor as conductor of the Festival Choral Society Charles Swinnerton Heap, who had died suddenly, as chorusmaster for the premiere of Edward Elgar's new work The Dream of Gerontius at the Birmingham Festival. By now Stockley was slow and physically feeble, rehearsals proceeded with acrimony and the premiere was widely considered a disaster.

== Bibliography ==
- Allen, Gordon C. (2000), William C Stockley, Birmingham: Birmingham Festival Choral Society
- Handford, Margaret (2006), Sounds Unlikely: Music in Birmingham, Studley: Brewin Books, ISBN 1858582873
- Morley, Christopher (29 June 2000), "Priceless baton completes vital music collection", Birmingham Post, Birmingham: Birmingham Post & Mail Ltd
