= List of British clarinet sonatas =

- Alice Mary Smith – Clarinet Sonata (1870)
- Charles Swinnerton Heap – Clarinet Sonata (1879)
- Ebenezer Prout – Clarinet Sonata, Op. 26 (1882)
- Samuel Coleridge-Taylor – Clarinet Sonata (c1893)
- William Henry Hadow – Clarinet Sonata (1897)
- Arnold Bax – Clarinet Sonata in E major (1901)
- Donald Francis Tovey – Clarinet Sonata in B-flat major, Op. 16 (1906)
- Charles Villiers Stanford – Clarinet Sonata, Op.129 (1911)
- William Henry Bell – Clarinet Sonata in D minor (1926)
- George Frederick Linstead – Clarinet Sonata (1932?)
- Arnold Bax – Clarinet Sonata in D major (1934)
- Mary Lucas – Clarinet Sonata (1938)
- Roger Fiske – Clarinet Sonata (1941)
- York Bowen – Clarinet Sonata, Op. 109 (1943)
- John Ireland – Fantasy-Sonata (1943)
- Herbert Howells – Clarinet Sonata in A (1947)
- Christopher Shaw – Clarinet Sonata (1949)
- Malcolm Arnold: Clarinet Sonatina, Op. 29 (1951)
- Roger Fiske – Clarinet Sonatina (1951)
- Pamela Harrison – Clarinet Sonata (1954)
- Iain Hamilton – Clarinet Sonata, Op. 22 (1955)
- Peter Maxwell Davies – Clarinet Sonata (1956)
- Ruth Gipps – Clarinet Sonata (1956)
- Arnold Cooke – Clarinet Sonata in B flat (1959)
- Alun Hoddinott – Clarinet Sonata (1967)
- Derek Bourgeois – Clarinet Sonata (1975)
- Timothy Salter – Clarinet Sonata (1976)
- Antony Roper (1921–2013) – Clarinet Sonata (1979)
- Joseph Horovitz – Clarinet Sonatina (1981)
- Graham Whettam – Clarinet Sonata (1988)
- Gary Carpenter – Clarinet Sonata (1991)
- Adam Gorb – Clarinet Sonata (1991)
- Marcus Blunt – Clarinet Sonata (1991)
- Michael Finnissy – Clarinet Sonata (2007)
