= Serenade for Strings (Elgar) =

1892 piece in three short movements by Edward Elgar

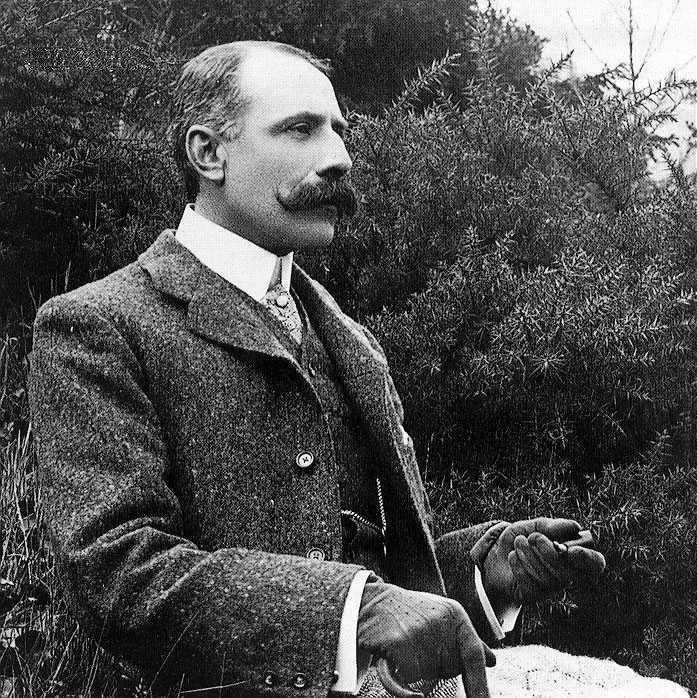
Edward Elgar, c. 1900

The Serenade for String Orchestra in E minor, Op. 20, is an early piece in three short movements, by Edward Elgar. It was written in March 1892 as a present to his wife, Alice on the occasion of their third wedding anniversary that year and first performed privately in that year; its public premiere was in 1896. It became one of Elgar's most popular compositions, and has been recorded many times.

== Background and first performances ==
In 1892, Elgar had yet to achieve the public recognition that came to him by the end of the decade. His compositions did not earn him enough to support his wife and daughter; he earned most of his living conducting local musical ensembles and teaching in his native Worcestershire, while continuing to compose.

The Serenade for Strings may be a revised version of an earlier set of Three Sketches for Strings, performed in May 1888 at a concert of the Worcestershire Musical Union. The sketches had the individual titles "Spring Song" (Allegro), "Elegy" (Adagio) and Finale (Presto); the manuscript of the Three Sketches does not survive, and their connection with the Serenade is conjectural. The Serenade was the first of Elgar's compositions with which he professed himself happy. He wrote to a friend about the three movements, "I like 'em (the first thing I ever did)". The critic Ernest Newman wrote in a 1906 study of Elgar that the Serenade and the concert overture Froissart (1890) were the only two works of importance among the composer's output before the mid 1890s: "the rest are experiments in various smaller forms – songs, pieces for piano and violin, part songs, slight pieces for small orchestra, &c".

The work was first given in a private performance in 1892 by the Worcester Ladies' Orchestral Class, with the composer conducting. His first attempt to interest a publisher in the piece was rebuffed on the grounds that though it was "very good", "this class of music is practically unsaleable", but he found a publisher in 1893. The Serenade received its first public performance in Antwerp, Belgium on 21 July 1896, but was not given publicly in Britain until 1899. Two movements were played at a concert in the Grand Pump Room at Bath in January of that year; the complete work was played at a concert in York on 5 April 1899, conducted by Thomas Tertius Noble; (Note: This first complete performance in Britain has been overlooked by several writers about Elgar, including Michael Kennedy, but it is well documented. The Yorkshire Herald recorded, "The strings alone had their opportunity in the three movements of a serenade by Edward Elgar … The subsidiary strings are [given] parts of a more distinctive character than usual". The Yorkshire Gazette reported, "Elgar's 'Serenade for Strings – Allegro, Larghetto, Allegretto' was skilfully performed".) and the composer conducted it at an all-Elgar concert in the seaside resort New Brighton on 16 July 1899. The work is dedicated to the organ builder and amateur musician Edward W. Whinfield, who had encouraged the composer in his early years.

== Music ==
Serenade for Strings, Op. 20
Performed by the United States Army Band Strings ensemble

The work typically plays for between 12 and 13 minutes in performance. (Note: The composer took 12:09 in his 1933 recording; Sir John Barbirolli's 1963 recording takes 13:05, Sir Adrian Boult (1968) takes 12:14, and Sir Mark Elder (2008) takes 12:57.) There are three movements:

1. Allegro piacevole
2. Larghetto
3. Allegretto

=== I. Allegro piacevole ===
The metronome mark is ♩. = 96. The gently rocking 6/8 metre of the first movement, the direction "piacevole" (pleasantly/agreeably) and avoidance of harmonic tension suggest a cradle song, according to the analyst Daniel Grimley, and an aubade according to Elgar's biographer Michael Kennedy. The movement opens with a figure in the violas that recurs throughout:

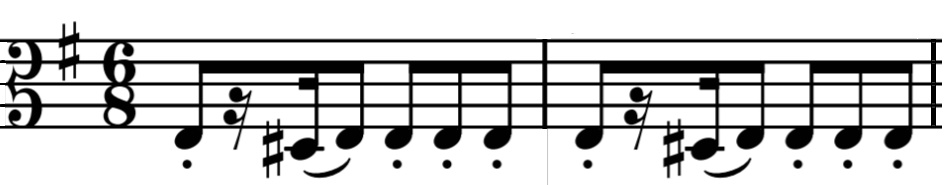
Opening theme, for violas

The main theme is heard from the third bar:

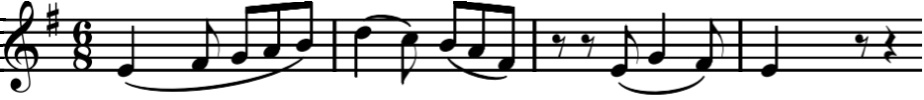
Main theme, violin line

The middle section is an arching melody, moving briefly into the minor, before the coda presents a new theme derived from the opening subject, which itself returns to bring the movement to a quiet conclusion.

=== II. Larghetto ===
The second movement, marked ♪ = 80, is in 2/4 time. After a brief introduction the main theme is what Newman describes as "a long and flexible melody sung by the first violins … one of the finest and most sustained that ever came from Elgar's pen":

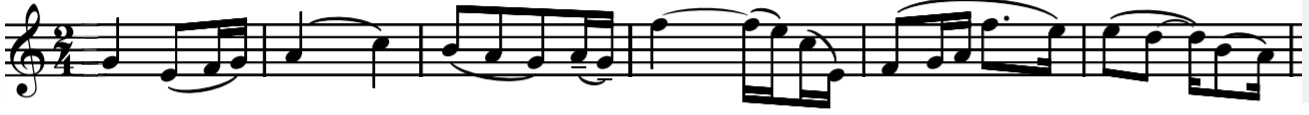
Main theme, violin line

The introductory theme returns at the end of the movement as a peroration.

=== III. Allegretto ===
The finale begins in 12/8 time, ♩. = 92, changing to 6/8 when Elgar reintroduces the main theme of the first movement to bring the work to a conclusion.

== Recordings ==
The Serenade has become one of Elgar’s most popular works, particularly with amateur groups, youth ensembles, and chamber orchestras, and is among the most recorded of his compositions.

Orchestra	Conductor	Year
London Philharmonic	Sir Edward Elgar	1933
New Symphony Orchestra of London	Anthony Collins	1952
Concert Hall Symphony Orchestra	Walter Goehr	1952
Royal Philharmonic	Sir Thomas Beecham	1955
London Symphony	Lawrance Collingwood	1955
Royal Philharmonic	George Weldon	1963
Sinfonia of London	Sir John Barbirolli	1963
Philharmonia	Sir Malcolm Sargent	1966
London Philharmonic	Sir Adrian Boult	1968
Academy of St Martin-in-the-Fields	Neville Marriner	1968
Bournemouth Symphony	Norman Del Mar	1968
English Chamber	Daniel Barenboim	1975
Royal Philharmonic	Ainslee Cox	1975
Orchestra of St John's Smith Square	John Lubbock	1975
Scottish Baroque Ensemble	Leonard Friedman	1980
Melbourne Symphony	Leonard Dommett	1982
London Philharmonic	Vernon Handley	1983
City of London Sinfonia	Richard Hickox	1984
Bournemouth Sinfonietta	George Hurst	1985
I Musici	–	1986
Orpheus	–	1986
London Philharmonic	Richard Armstrong	1986
English Chamber	Yehudi Menuhin	1986
New York Virtuosi Chamber Symphony	Kenneth Klein	1987
Royal Philharmonic	Andrew Litton	1988
London Chamber	Christopher Warren-Green	1989
Capella Istropolitana	Adrian Leaper	1989
London Philharmonic	Leonard Slatkin	1989
Baltimore Symphony	David Zinman	1989
Royal Philharmonic	Sir Charles Groves	1990
BBC Symphony	Andrew Davis	1991
Australian Chamber Orchestra	Richard Tognetti	1992
Royal Philharmonic	Barry Wordsworth	1993
Philharmonia	Giuseppe Sinopoli	1994
Budapest Strings	Karoly Botvay	1994
English String Orchestra	William Boughton	1995
London Festival Orchestra	Ross Pople	1997
English Chamber	Paul Goodwin	2001
Radio-Sinfonieorchester Stuttgart	Sir Roger Norrington	2001
Rotterdam Chamber Orchestra	Conrad van Alphen	2003
Philharmonia	Sir Andrew Davis	2007
Wales Camerata	Owain Arwel Hughes	2007
Sydney Symphony	Vladimir Ashkenazy	2009
Orchestra of The Swan	David Curtis	2014
English Chamber	Julian Lloyd Webber	2015
Ostrobothnian Chamber Orchestra	Sakari Oramo	2016
BBC Symphony	Edward Gardner	2018
Zürcher Kammerorchester	Daniel Hope	2020
Anima Musicæ Chamber	László Horváth	2021

== See also ==
- Serenade for Strings (Dvořák)
- Serenade for Strings (Suk)
- Serenade for Strings (Tchaikovsky)

== Notes, references and sources ==
=== Sources ===
- Grimley, Daniel (2005). "The Chamber Music and Works for Strings". In Daniel Grimley; Julian Rushton (eds.). The Cambridge Companion to Elgar. Cambridge: Cambridge University Press. ISBN 978-1-139-00225-7.
- Kennedy, Michael (1987). Portrait of Elgar (third ed.). Oxford University Press. ISBN 978-0-19-284017-2.
- Moore, Jerrold Northrop (1984). Edward Elgar: A Creative Life. Oxford: Oxford University Press. ISBN 978-0-19-315447-6.
- Newman, Ernest (1906). Elgar (third ed.). London: J. Lane. OCLC 2560311.
