= Diana McVeagh =

British author on classical music (1926–2025)

- McVeagh in 2021
- Born: 6 September, 1926; Ipoh, Malaysia
- Died: 2 July 2025
- Education: Malvern College, Royal College of Music
- Occupation: biographer

Diana Mary McVeagh (6 September 1926 – 2 July 2025) was a British author and classical music scholar.

== Life and career ==
McVeagh was born on 6 September 1926 in Ipoh, Malaysia. Her father John McVeagh was managing a rubber plantation. Her mother Margaret was a singer who had studied with Harry Plunket Greene at the Royal College of Music.

Returning to the UK at the age of five, McVeagh was educated at Malvern College before studying at the Royal College of Music from 1944. While there she took lessons from Frank Howes, then music critic at The Times. She was assistant editor with Andrew Porter at The Musical Times, a contributor to The Listener, and served on the editorial board of the New Grove Dictionary of Music and Musicians.

McVeagh wrote a biography of Gerald Finzi, and edited a volume of Finzi's letters. She also wrote several books on Edward Elgar.

Since 2013, the North American British Music Studies Association has awarded a biennial Diana McVeagh Prize for Best Book on British Music.

McVeagh was married to the pathologist Bill Morley from 1950 until his death in 1994. McVeagh died on 2 July 2025, at the age of 98.

== Publications ==
- Edward Elgar: His Life and Music (1955)
- Gerald Finzi: His Life and Music (2005)
- Elgar the Music Maker (2007)
- (as editor) Gerald Finzi’s Letters, 1915-1956 (2021)
