= Herbert Wareing =

British composer and organist (1857–1918)

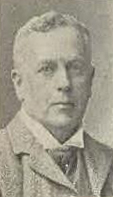

Herbert Walter Wareing (5 April 1857 – 29 March 1918) was an organist and composer based in England.

== Life ==
Wareing was the son of John Wareing and Martha Jane. He studied under Dr. Charles Swinnerton Heap, and at the Leipzig Conservatoire under Karl Reinecke, Salomon Jadassohn and Ernst Richter.

He graduated Mus. Bac from the University of Cambridge in 1882 and Mus. Doc in 1886. Wareing was professor of pianoforte at Malvern College, and directory of the Worcester Cathedral Choir School.

He married Louisa Susanna Millward in 1892.

== Appointments ==
- Organist of St John's Church, Wolverhampton 1876–79
- Organist of St Bartholomew's Church, Edgbaston, Birmingham 1881–88
- Organist of St. Nicolas' Church, Kings Norton 1891–1906
- Organist of Christ Church, Malvern 1911–18

== Compositions ==
His compositions include:

- Cantatas, Prayer and Praise; New Year's Eve; The Wreck of the Hesperus, for tenor and bass soli, chorus and orchestra, 1895.
- Church service in G
- Anthems, part-songs, songs.
- Concert overture in F (Birmingham, 1879)
- String quartet in F (Leipzig, 1876)
- Ten concert pieces for violin and pianoforte
- Two pieces for violoncello and pianoforte
- Pieces for organ and pianoforte
