= Keith Alldritt =

British novelist, biographer, and critic

Keith Alldritt is a contemporary British novelist, biographer and critic.

== Biography ==
Aldritt was educated at Wolverhampton Grammar School and St Catharine's College, Cambridge. He lives and works in the West Midlands, the setting for his novels. For some years he was a professor of English and American Studies at the University of Illinois and then at the University of British Columbia, Canada. He has written extensively for radio, television and film and has contributed articles on modern and contemporary art to various magazines and newspapers in Britain, Canada and the United States.

He was made a Fellow of the Royal Society of Literature in 1978.

== Awards ==
His novel The Good Pit Man was a New Fiction Society choice. For his biography David Jones-Writer and Artist he was elected to membership of the Welsh Academi.

== Books ==
- England Resounding - Elgar, Vaughan Williams, Britten and the English Musical Renaissance (Robert Hale 2019) ISBN 978-0-7198-2975-8
- Vaughan Williams: Composer, Radical, Patriot - A Biography (Robert Hale 2015) ISBN 978-0-7198-0937-8
- David Jones:Writer and Artist (2003) ISBN 1-84119-379-8
- The Poet as Spy: The Life and Wild Times of Basil Bunting (1998) ISBN 1-85410-477-2
- W.B.Yeats:The Man and the Milieu (1997) ISBN 0-7195-5354-7
- The Greatest of Friends: Franklin D.Roosvelt and Winston Churchill, 1941-1945 (1995) ISBN 0-7090-5266-9
- Churchill the Writer: His Life as a Man of Letters (1992) ISBN 0-09-177085-8
- Modernism in the Second World War: The Later Poetry of Ezra Pound, T.S.Eliot, Basil Bunting and Hugh MacDiarmid (1989) ISBN 0-8204-0865-4
- Eliot's Four Quartets: Poetry as Chamber Music ISBN 0-7130-0161-5
- Elgar on the Journey to Hanley: A Novel (1979) ISBN 0-233-97064-9
- The Lover Next Door (1977) ISBN 0-233-96880-6
- The Good Pit Man: A Novel (1976) LCCCN 765367
- The Visual Imagination of D.H. Lawrence (1971) ISBN 0-7131-5582-5
- The Making of George Orwell: An Essay in Literary History (1969) ISBN 0-7131-5456-X
