= Froissart Overture (Elgar) =

1890 concert overture composed by Edward Elgar

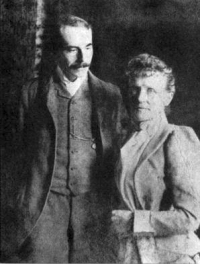
Edward and Alice Elgar, c. 1891

Froissart, Op. 19, is a concert overture by Edward Elgar, inspired by the 14th-century Chronicles of Jean Froissart. Elgar was first attracted to the Chronicles after finding mention of them in Walter Scott's Old Mortality.

== History ==
Froissart was composed in 1890 to the commission of the Worcester Festival, for a secular concert during that year's Three Choirs Festival, and was Elgar's first large-scale work for full orchestra. Ironically, ambitious Elgar, who moved to London for his career, got this major contract from his hometown. The work was finished by July, and it was first performed in Worcester, conducted by the composer, on 9 September 1890. It was performed three days later in Birmingham by William Stockley's Orchestra, for whom the composer had played violin since 1882, but it would be ten years before the work was performed in London.

== Structure ==
Allegro moderato, 4/4, B♭ major

The work consists of a single movement, lasting a little under a quarter of an hour.

The motto written by Elgar on the manuscript score is a quotation from an 1817 poem by Keats: "When Chivalry lifted up her lance on high". The opening is a graphically chivalric flourish, but commentators have found the subsequent working out of the themes too long and discursive.

Nevertheless, although an obviously early work, it contains some touches of the mature Elgar. W. H. Reed singles out 'the quick rise from G sharp through two octaves and a semitone to the top A at the ninth bar after letter B', and notes a 'growing habit of scattering expression marks in great profusion', leaving conductors 'very little room for the introduction of their own idiosyncrasies'. However, it is generally agreed that the piece shows immaturity: Michael Kennedy comments on the 'weak and too-lengthy development' and the 'half digested' influence of other composers. Elgar himself concluded that the work was too long, but even after he had gone on to write more characteristic and mature compositions he described Froissart as 'good, healthy stuff.'

Froissart is not a programmatic work: unlike the later Falstaff or even Cockaigne it does not tell a detailed story; it evokes a mood and manner in broad terms.

== Recordings ==
The work has been recorded many times. Elgar himself recorded it with the London Philharmonic Orchestra in 1933 for His Master's Voice. This recording was reissued on CD in 2007. Perhaps the best-known version in more recent years has been the 1966 EMI recording by the New Philharmonia Orchestra conducted by Sir John Barbirolli. Other recordings include those conducted by Sir Adrian Boult (EMI), Alexander Gibson (Chandos Records), Bryden Thomson (Chandos Records), Leonard Slatkin (RCA Records), James Judd (Naxos Records) and Mark Elder (the Hallé Orchestra's own label) and most recently Sir Andrew Davis conducting the Philharmonia Orchestra (2010).

== Notes ==
=== Sources ===
- Kennedy, Michael (1970). Elgar Orchestral Music. London: BBC.
- Kennedy, Michael: notes to EMI CD CDM 5 66323 2.
- Reed, W. H. (1943). Elgar. London: J. M. Dent.
- Froissart (Elgar): Scores at the International Music Score Library Project
