= Clara Angela Macirone =

English pianist and composer

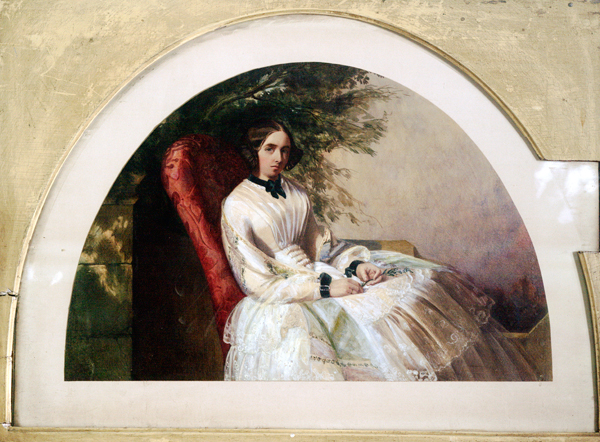
- Clara Angela Macirone
- Born: 20 January 1821; London, England
- Died: 1914 (aged 92–93); London, England
- Occupation: Musician

Clara Angela Macirone (20 January 1821 – 1914) was an English pianist and composer who published her music as C. A. Macirone. Born in London, she was the daughter of Italian musicians; her mother was also a pianist (a pupil of Charles Neate) and her father was an amateur tenor. She began her studies at the Royal Academy of Music in 1839 under Cipriani Potter, W H Holmes, Charles Lucas and others. She later took a position teaching at the Academy.

Her first concert was given at the Hanover Square Rooms on 26 June 1846, at which the baritone Johann Pischek performed her sacred song Benedictus, a composition later praised by Mendelssohn. She was active as a performer until 1864. After that, Macirone turned to teaching and composing. Her Te Deum and Jubilate were sung at Hanover Chapel and claimed to have been the first service by a woman ever used in the Church.

Macirone was a pioneer in the musical education of women as both a teacher and writer. She held teaching positions at Aske's School for Girls in Hatcham (1872-8) and at the Church of England High School for Girls, Baker Street. She contributed articles to The Girl's Own Paper and The Argosy. Macirone died in London in 1914.

== Works ==
Selected works include:

- Suite for piano and violin in E minor
- Rondino in G for piano
- By the Waters of Babylon, anthem (sung at Canterbury, Ely and elsewhere)
- Te Deum and Jubilate
- Benedictus
- Footsteps of Angels, choral
- Come to Me, Oh Ye Children (Text: Henry Wadsworth Longfellow)
- Fare thee well! and if for ever (Text: George Gordon Noel Byron, Lord Byron)
- Hesperus (Text: Edwin Arnold after Sappho)
- The Balaclava Charge (Text: Alfred, Lord Tennyson)
- There is dew for the flow'ret (Text: Thomas Hood)
