= Cockaigne (In London Town) =

Concert overture by Edward Elgar

Cover of published score

Cockaigne (In London Town), Op. 40, also known as the Cockaigne Overture, is a concert overture for full orchestra written by the English composer Edward Elgar in 1900–1901. It was his first purely orchestral work after his Enigma Variations had propelled him to national celebrity and it was an immediate success and has been much performed in concert and on record ever since.

== History ==
The success of Elgar's Enigma Variations in 1899 was followed by the initial failure of The Dream of Gerontius, which caused the composer to become dispirited and declare that God was against art. Nevertheless, he received a commission from the Royal Philharmonic Society and began work on a new piece and soon reported that it was "cheerful and Londony, 'stout and steaky'... honest, healthy, humorous and strong, but not vulgar".

The first performance was in the Queen's Hall, London at a Royal Philharmonic Society concert, on 20 June 1901, conducted by the composer. He dedicated the work to his "many friends, the members of British orchestras." The music was an immediate success and became one of Elgar's most popular works. It continues to appear regularly in the concert hall, on disc and on broadcasts. Elgar's biographer, Michael Kennedy writes that it is "Elgar's finest overture".

== Description ==
In its 15 minutes or so the overture gives a lively and colourful musical portrait of Edwardian London. "Cockaigne" was a term used by moralists at that time as a metaphor for gluttony and drunkenness, while Britain adopted the name humorously for London. The work presents various aspects of turn-of-the-century London and Londoners. It begins with a quiet but bustling theme which leads into an unbroken sequence of snapshots: the cockneys, the church bells, the romantic couples, a slightly ragged brass band (perhaps the Salvation Army) and a contrastingly grand and imperious military band. The broad theme representing Londoners is the first occurrence in an orchestral score of Elgar’s trademark direction, nobilmente (nobly). The work culminates in a characteristically Elgarian blaze of orchestral sound – including a full organ – in E♭, leading to closing bars in C.

Mindful of the way Elgar brings his themes together at the climax of the piece, both Bernard Shaw and W. H. "Billy" Reed compared the work to Richard Wagner's Die Meistersinger von Nürnberg Prelude, which culminates in the combination of several themes. Shaw, in a long article on Elgar in 1920, wrote:

But if you say that Elgar's Cockaigne overture combines every classic quality of a concert overture with every lyrical and dramatic quality of the overture to Die Meistersinger, you are either uttering a platitude as safe as a compliment to Handel on the majesty of the "Hallelujah" Chorus, or else damning yourself to all critical posterity by uttering a gaffe that will make your grandson blush for you. Personally, I am prepared to take the risk. What do I care for my grandson? Give me Cockaigne.

Reed wrote:

The Cockaigne Overture does not eclipse the Mastersingers prelude, but neither is it outshone by Wagner's most symphonically satisfying introductory composition from which it actually borrows some procedures. Elgar's piece is as splendidly evocative a picture of Edwardian London as Wagner's is of medieval Nuremberg, and there is nothing to choose between the two in humour, mastery of construction and appositeness of scoring.

The Elgar scholar Julian Rushton writes that although there are echoes of Die Meistersinger, and both overtures "use busy counterpoint within a loose sonata pattern", Elgar’s aural pictures are quite different from Wagner's medieval Nuremberg: "his London is not only the hub of an Empire but the city of music-hall and Covent Garden (market, not opera)".

== Recordings ==
Conductor	Orchestra	Year
Sir Edward Elgar	Royal Albert Hall Orchestra	1926
Sir Edward Elgar	BBC Symphony Orchestra	1933
Malcolm Sargent	NBC Symphony Orchestra	1945
Eduard van Beinum	London Philharmonic Orchestra	1950
Sir Thomas Beecham	Royal Philharmonic Orchestra	1955
Sir John Barbirolli	Hallé Orchestra	1955
Sir Adrian Boult	London Philharmonic Orchestra	1957
Sir John Barbirolli	Philharmonia Orchestra	1963
George Weldon	Royal Philharmonic Orchestra	1964
Colin Davis	London Symphony Orchestra	1965
Colin Davis	BBC Symphony Orchestra	1969
Eugene Ormandy	Philadelphia Orchestra	1972
Sir Adrian Boult	London Philharmonic Orchestra	1972
George Hurst	Bournemouth Symphony Orchestra	1972
Edward Heath	London Symphony Orchestra	1972
Daniel Barenboim	London Philharmonic Orchestra	1974
Sir Georg Solti	London Philharmonic Orchestra	1976
Vernon Handley	London Philharmonic Orchestra	1979
Sir Alexander Gibson	Royal Scottish National Orchestra	1983
Neville Marriner	Dresden Staatskapelle	1983
Leonard Slatkin	London Philharmonic Orchestra	1989
David Zinman	Baltimore Symphony Orchestra	1989
William Boughton	English Symphony Orchestra	1989
Owain Arwel Hughes	London Philharmonic Orchestra	1989
Sir Charles Groves	Royal Philharmonic Orchestra	1990
Sir Andrew Davis	BBC Symphony Orchestra	1991
Sir Charles Mackerras	London Symphony Orchestra	1991
Yehudi Menuhin	Royal Philharmonic Orchestra	1991
Adrian Leaper	Polish National Radio Symphony Orchestra	1991
André Previn	London Symphony Orchestra	1993
Jeffrey Tate	London Symphony Orchestra	1995
Bramwell Tovey	Winnipeg Symphony Orchestra	1998
Sir Mark Elder	Hallé Orchestra	2003
Sakari Oramo	Royal Stockholm Philharmonic Orchestra	2014
Alexander Soddy	Mannheim National Theatre Orchestra	2024

Source: WorldCat and Naxos Music Library

== Sources ==
- Kennedy, Michael (1970). Elgar: Orchestral Music. London: BBC. OCLC 252020259.
- Kennedy, Michael (1987). Portrait of Elgar (third ed.). Oxford: Clarendon Press. ISBN 0-19-284017-7.
- Laurence, Dan, ed. (1981). Shaw's Music, Volume III. London: The Bodley Head. ISBN 0-370-31272-4.
- Reed, W. H. (1946). Elgar. London: Dent. OCLC 8858707.
- Rushton, Julian (2011). "In Search of the Symphony: Orchestral Music to 1908". The Cambridge Companion to Elgar. Cambridge: Cambridge University. ISBN 978-1-13-900225-7.
