= Edward Elgar =

English composer (1857–1934)

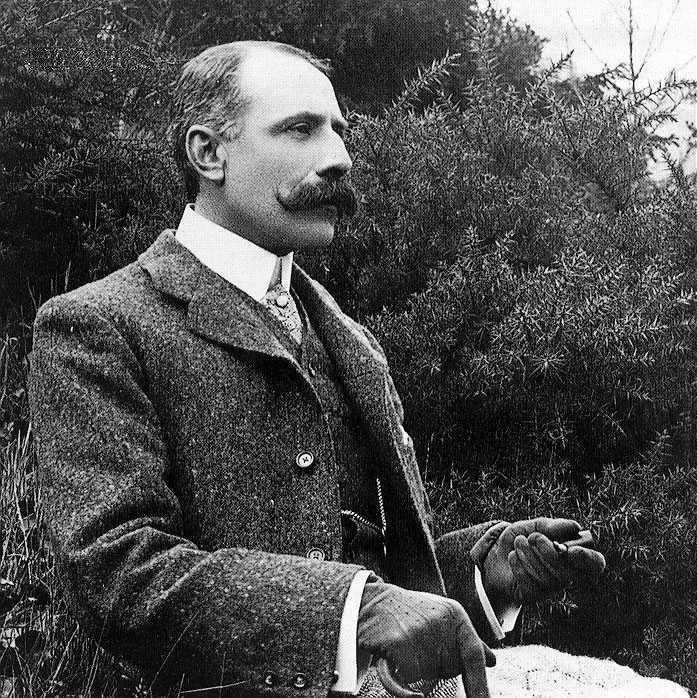
Elgar, c. 1900

Sir Edward William Elgar, 1st Baronet (/ˈɛlɡɑːr/; 2 June 1857 – 23 February 1934), was an English composer, many of whose works have entered the British and international classical concert repertoire. Among his best-known compositions are orchestral works including the Enigma Variations, the Pomp and Circumstance Marches, concertos for violin and cello, and two symphonies. He also composed choral works, including The Dream of Gerontius, chamber music and songs. He was appointed Master of the King's Musick in 1924.

Although Elgar is often regarded as a typically English composer, most of his musical influences were not from England but from continental Europe. He felt himself to be an outsider, not only musically, but socially. In musical circles dominated by academics, he was a self-taught composer; in Protestant Britain, his Roman Catholicism was regarded with suspicion in some quarters; and in the class-conscious society of Victorian and Edwardian Britain, he was acutely sensitive about his humble origins even after he achieved recognition. He nevertheless married the daughter of a senior British Army officer. She inspired him both musically and socially, but he struggled to achieve success until his forties, when after a series of moderately successful works his Enigma Variations (1899) became immediately popular in Britain and overseas. He followed the Variations with a choral work, The Dream of Gerontius (1900), based on a Roman Catholic text that caused some disquiet in the Anglican establishment in Britain, but it became, and has remained, a core repertory work in Britain and elsewhere. His later full-length religious choral works were well received but have not entered the regular repertory.

In his fifties, Elgar composed a symphony and a violin concerto that were immensely successful. His second symphony and his cello concerto did not gain immediate public popularity and took many years to achieve a regular place in the concert repertory of British orchestras. Elgar's music came, in his later years, to be seen as appealing chiefly to British audiences. His stock remained low for a generation after his death. It began to revive significantly in the 1960s, helped by new recordings of his works. Some of his works have, in recent years, been taken up again internationally, but the music continues to be played more in Britain than elsewhere.

Elgar has been described as the first composer to take the gramophone seriously. Between 1914 and 1925, he conducted a series of acoustic recordings of his works. The introduction of the moving-coil microphone in 1923 made far more accurate sound reproduction possible, and Elgar made new recordings of most of his major orchestral works and excerpts from The Dream of Gerontius.

== Biography ==
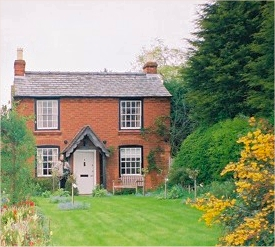
Elgar's birthplace, The Firs, Lower Broadheath, Worcestershire

=== Early years ===
Edward Elgar was born in the small village of Lower Broadheath, near Worcester, England, on 2 June 1857. His father, William Henry Elgar, was raised in Dover and had been apprenticed to a London music publisher. In 1841 William moved to Worcester, where he worked as a piano tuner and set up a shop selling sheet music and musical instruments. In 1848 he married Ann Greening, daughter of a farm worker.

Edward was the fourth of their seven children. (Note: His siblings were Henry John ("Harry", 1848–1864), Lucy Ann ("Loo", 1852–1925), Susannah Mary ("Pollie", 1854–1925), Frederick Joseph ("Jo", 1859–1866), Francis Thomas ("Frank", 1861–1929), and Helen Agnes ("Dot", 1864–1939).) Ann Elgar had converted to Roman Catholicism shortly before Edward's birth, and he was baptised and brought up as a Roman Catholic, to the disapproval of his father. (Note: William Elgar was evidently sceptical of any branch of the church: he wrote of "the absurd superstition and play-house mummery of the Papist; the cold and formal ceremonies of the Church of England; or the bigotry and rank hypocrisy of the Wesleyan".) William Elgar was a violinist of professional standard and held the post of organist of St George's Roman Catholic Church, Worcester, from 1846 to 1885. At his instigation, masses by Cherubini and Hummel were first heard at the Three Choirs Festival by the orchestra in which he played the violin.

All the Elgar children received a musical upbringing. By the age of eight, Elgar was taking piano and violin lessons, and his father, who tuned the pianos at many grand houses in Worcestershire, would sometimes take him along, giving him the chance to display his skill to important local figures.

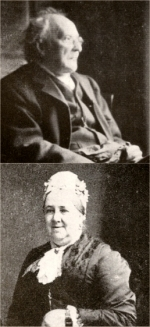
Elgar's parents, William and Ann Elgar

Elgar's mother was interested in the arts and encouraged his musical development. He inherited from her a discerning taste for literature and a passionate love of the countryside. His friend and biographer W. H. "Billy" Reed wrote that Elgar's early surroundings had an influence that "permeated all his work and gave to his whole life that subtle but none the less true and sturdy English quality". (Note: Elgar himself later said, "There is music in the air, music all around us, the world is full of it and you simply take as much as you require", and "The trees are singing my music – or have I sung theirs?") He began composing at an early age; for a play written and acted by the Elgar children when he was about ten, he wrote music that forty years later he rearranged with only minor changes and orchestrated as the suites titled The Wand of Youth.

Until he was fifteen, Elgar received a general education at Littleton (now Lyttleton) (Note: It is spelt "Littleton" by all the Elgar authorities cited; however, some current sources, for example English Heritage, spell it "Lyttleton".) House school, near Worcester. His only formal musical training beyond piano and violin lessons from local teachers consisted of more advanced violin studies with Adolf Pollitzer, during brief visits to London in 1877–78. Elgar said, "my first music was learnt in the Cathedral ... from books borrowed from the music library, when I was eight, nine or ten." He worked through manuals of instruction on organ playing and read every book he could find on the theory of music. He later said that he had been most helped by Hubert Parry's articles in the Grove Dictionary of Music and Musicians.

Elgar began to learn German, in the hope of going to the Leipzig Conservatory for further musical studies, but his father could not afford to send him. Years later, a profile in The Musical Times considered that his failure to get to Leipzig was fortunate for Elgar's musical development: "Thus the budding composer escaped the dogmatism of the schools." However, it was a disappointment to Elgar that on leaving school in 1872 he went not to Leipzig but to the office of a local solicitor as a clerk. He did not find an office career congenial, and for fulfilment he turned not only to music but to literature, becoming a voracious reader. (Note: A profile in The Musical Times reported that Elgar "read a great deal at this formulative period of his life. ... In this way he made the acquaintance of Sir Philip Sidney's Arcadia, Richard Baker's Chronicles, Michael Drayton's Polyolbion", and the works of Voltaire.") Around this time, he made his first public appearances as a violinist and organist.

After a few months, Elgar left the solicitor to embark on a musical career, giving piano and violin lessons and working occasionally in his father's shop. He was an active member of the Worcester Glee club, along with his father, and he accompanied singers, played the violin, composed and arranged works, and conducted for the first time. Pollitzer believed that, as a violinist, Elgar had the potential to be one of the leading soloists in the country, but Elgar himself, having heard leading virtuosi at London concerts, felt his own violin playing lacked a full enough tone, and he abandoned his ambitions to be a soloist. At twenty-two he took up the post of conductor of the attendants' band at the Worcester and County Lunatic Asylum in Powick, three miles (five kilometres) from Worcester. The band consisted of: piccolo, flute, clarinet, two cornets, euphonium, three or four first and a similar number of second violins, occasional viola, cello, double bass and piano. Elgar coached the players and wrote and arranged their music, including quadrilles and polkas, for the unusual combination of instruments. The Musical Times wrote, "This practical experience proved to be of the greatest value to the young musician. ... He acquired a practical knowledge of the capabilities of these different instruments. ... He thereby got to know intimately the tone colour, the ins and outs of these and many other instruments." He held the post for five years, from 1879, travelling to Powick once a week. Another post he held in his early days was professor of the violin at the Worcester College for the Blind Sons of Gentlemen.

Although rather solitary and introspective by nature, Elgar thrived in Worcester's musical circles. He played in the violins at the Worcester and Birmingham Festivals, and one great experience was to play Dvořák's Symphony No. 6 and Stabat Mater under the composer's baton. Elgar regularly played the bassoon in a wind quintet, alongside his brother Frank, an oboist (and conductor who ran his own wind band). Elgar arranged numerous pieces by Mozart, Beethoven, Haydn, and others for the quintet, honing his arranging and compositional skills.

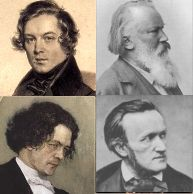
Clockwise from top left: Schumann, Brahms, Wagner and Rubinstein, whose music inspired Elgar in Leipzig

In his first trips abroad, Elgar visited Paris in 1880 and Leipzig in 1882. He heard Saint-Saëns play the organ at the Madeleine and attended concerts by first-rate orchestras. In 1882 he wrote, "I got pretty well dosed with Schumann (my ideal!), Brahms, Rubinstein & Wagner, so had no cause to complain." In Leipzig he visited a friend, Helen Weaver, who was a student at the Conservatoire. They became engaged in the summer of 1883, but for unknown reasons the engagement was broken off the next year. Elgar was greatly distressed, and some of his later cryptic dedications of romantic music may have alluded to Helen and his feelings for her. (Note: Kennedy (ODNB) mentions the 'Romanza' variation (no. 13) in the Enigma Variations and the Violin Concerto as possible examples, the former being headed "****" and the latter being inscribed as enshrining an unnamed soul.) Throughout his life, Elgar was often inspired by close women friends; Helen Weaver was succeeded by Mary Lygon, Dora Penny, Julia Worthington, Alice Stuart Wortley and finally Vera Hockman, who enlivened his old age.

In 1882, seeking more professional orchestral experience, Elgar was employed as a violinist in Birmingham in William Stockley's Orchestra, for whom he played every concert for the next seven years and where he later said he "learned all the music I know". On 13 December 1883 he took part with Stockley in a performance at Birmingham Town Hall of one of his first works for full orchestra, the Sérénade mauresque – the first time one of his compositions had been performed by a professional orchestra. Stockley had invited him to conduct the piece but later recalled "he declined, and, further, insisted upon playing in his place in the orchestra. The consequence was that he had to appear, fiddle in hand, to acknowledge the genuine and hearty applause of the audience." Elgar often went to London in an attempt to get his works published, but this period in his life found him frequently despondent and low on money. He wrote to a friend in April 1884, "My prospects are about as hopeless as ever ... I am not wanting in energy I think, so sometimes I conclude that 'tis want of ability. ... I have no money – not a cent."

=== Marriage ===
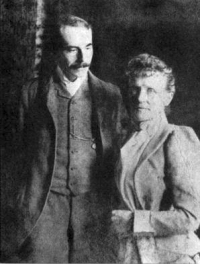
Edward and Alice Elgar, c. 1891

When Elgar was 29, he took on a new pupil, Caroline Alice Roberts, known as Alice, daughter of the late Major-General Sir Henry Roberts, and published author of verse and prose fiction. Eight years older than Elgar, Alice became his wife three years later. Elgar's biographer Michael Kennedy writes, "Alice's family was horrified by her intention to marry an unknown musician who worked in a shop and was a Roman Catholic. She was disinherited." They were married on 8 May 1889, at Brompton Oratory. From then until her death, she acted as his business manager and social secretary, dealt with his mood swings, and was a perceptive musical critic. She did her best to gain him the attention of influential society, though with limited success. In time, he would learn to accept the honours given him, realising that they mattered more to her and her social class and recognising what she had given up to further his career. (Note: When Elgar was knighted in 1904, his daughter Carice said, "I am so glad for Mother's sake that Father has been knighted. You see – it puts her back where she was".) In her diary, she wrote, "The care of a genius is enough of a life work for any woman." As an engagement present, Elgar dedicated his short violin-and-piano piece Salut d'Amour to her. (Note: Salut d'Amour became one of Elgar's best-selling works, but initially he earned no royalties, having sold the copyright to the publisher Schott for a flat fee of 2 guineas; Schott later decided to pay him royalties.) With Alice's encouragement, the Elgars moved to London to be closer to the centre of British musical life, and Elgar started devoting his time to composition. Their only child, Carice Irene, was born at their home in West Kensington on 14 August 1890. Her name, revealed in Elgar's dedication of Salut d'Amour, was a contraction of her mother's names Caroline and Alice.

Elgar took full advantage of the opportunity to hear unfamiliar music. In the days before miniature scores and recordings were available, it was not easy for young composers to get to know new music. Elgar took every chance to do so at the Crystal Palace Concerts. He and Alice attended day after day, hearing music by a wide range of composers. Among these were masters of orchestration from whom he learned much, such as Berlioz and Richard Wagner. His own compositions made little impact on London's musical scene. August Manns conducted Elgar's orchestral version of Salut d'amour and the Suite in D at the Crystal Palace, and two publishers accepted some of Elgar's violin pieces, organ voluntaries, and part songs. Some tantalising opportunities seemed to be within reach but vanished unexpectedly. For example, an offer from the Royal Opera House, Covent Garden, to run through some of his works was withdrawn at the last second when Sir Arthur Sullivan arrived unannounced to rehearse some of his own music. Sullivan was horrified when Elgar later told him what had happened. (Note: Sullivan said to Elgar, "But, my dear boy, I hadn't the slightest idea of it – why on earth didn't you come and tell me? I'd have rehearsed it myself for you".) Elgar's only important commission while in London came from his home city: the Worcester Festival Committee invited him to compose a short orchestral work for the 1890 Three Choirs Festival. The result is described by Diana McVeagh in the Grove Dictionary of Music and Musicians, as "his first major work, the assured and uninhibited Froissart." Elgar conducted the first performance in Worcester in September 1890. For lack of other work, he was obliged to leave London in 1891 and return with his wife and child to Worcestershire, where he could earn a living conducting local musical ensembles and teaching. They settled in Alice's former home town, Great Malvern.

=== Growing reputation ===
Serenade for Strings (Op. 20, mv 1)
Elgar's Serenade for Strings, movement 1, performed by the United States Army Band Strings ensemble

During the 1890s, Elgar gradually built up a reputation as a composer, chiefly of works for the great choral festivals of the English Midlands. The Black Knight (1892) and King Olaf (1896), both inspired by Longfellow, The Light of Life (1896) and Caractacus (1898) were all modestly successful, and he obtained a long-standing publisher in Novello and Co. Other works of this decade included the Serenade for Strings (1892) and Three Bavarian Dances (1897). Elgar was of enough consequence locally to recommend the young composer Samuel Coleridge-Taylor to the Three Choirs Festival for a concert piece, which helped establish the younger man's career. (Note: Elgar, in recommending Coleridge-Taylor for a commission from the festival, said, "He is far and away the cleverest fellow going among the young men.") Elgar was catching the attention of prominent critics, but their reviews were polite rather than enthusiastic. Although he was in demand as a festival composer, he was only just getting by financially and felt unappreciated. In 1898, he said he was "very sick at heart over music" and hoped to find a way to succeed with a larger work. His friend August Jaeger tried to lift his spirits: "A day's attack of the blues ... will not drive away your desire, your necessity, which is to exercise those creative faculties which a kind providence has given you. Your time of universal recognition will come."

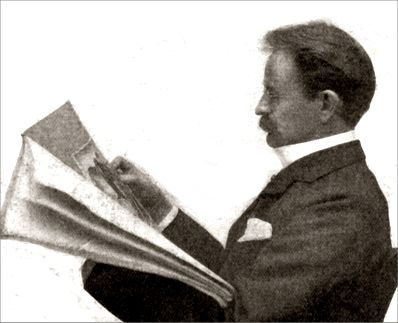
August Jaeger, Elgar's publisher and friend, and "Nimrod" of the Enigma Variations

In 1899, that prediction suddenly came true. At the age of forty-two, Elgar produced the Enigma Variations, which were premiered in London under the baton of Austro-Hungarian conductor Hans Richter. In Elgar's own words, "I have sketched a set of Variations on an original theme. The Variations have amused me because I've labelled them with the nicknames of my particular friends ... that is to say I've written the variations each one to represent the mood of the 'party' (the person) ... and have written what I think they would have written – if they were asses enough to compose". He dedicated the work "To my friends pictured within". Probably the best known variation is "Nimrod", depicting Jaeger. Purely musical considerations led Elgar to omit variations depicting Arthur Sullivan and Hubert Parry, whose styles he tried but failed to incorporate in the variations. The large-scale work was received with general acclaim for its originality, charm and craftsmanship, and it established Elgar as the pre-eminent British composer of his generation.

The work is formally titled Variations on an Original Theme; the word "Enigma" appears over the first six bars of music, which led to the familiar version of the title. The enigma is that, although there are fourteen variations on the "original theme", there is another overarching theme, never identified by Elgar, which he said "runs through and over the whole set" but is never heard. (Note: It is not known whether Elgar meant a musical theme or a more general non-musical theme such as that of friendship. Many attempts have been made to find well-known tunes that can be played in counterpoint with Elgar's main musical theme of the piece, from Auld Lang Syne to a theme from Mozart's Prague Symphony.) Later commentators have observed that although Elgar is today regarded as a characteristically English composer, his orchestral music and this work in particular share much with the Central European tradition typified at the time by the work of Richard Strauss. The Enigma Variations were well received in Germany and Italy, and remain to the present day a worldwide concert staple. (Note: For example, according to the Elgar Society's website, in April and May 2010, the Variations were programmed in New Orleans, New York, Vancouver, Denver, Moscow, Washington D.C. and Kraków.)

=== National and international fame ===
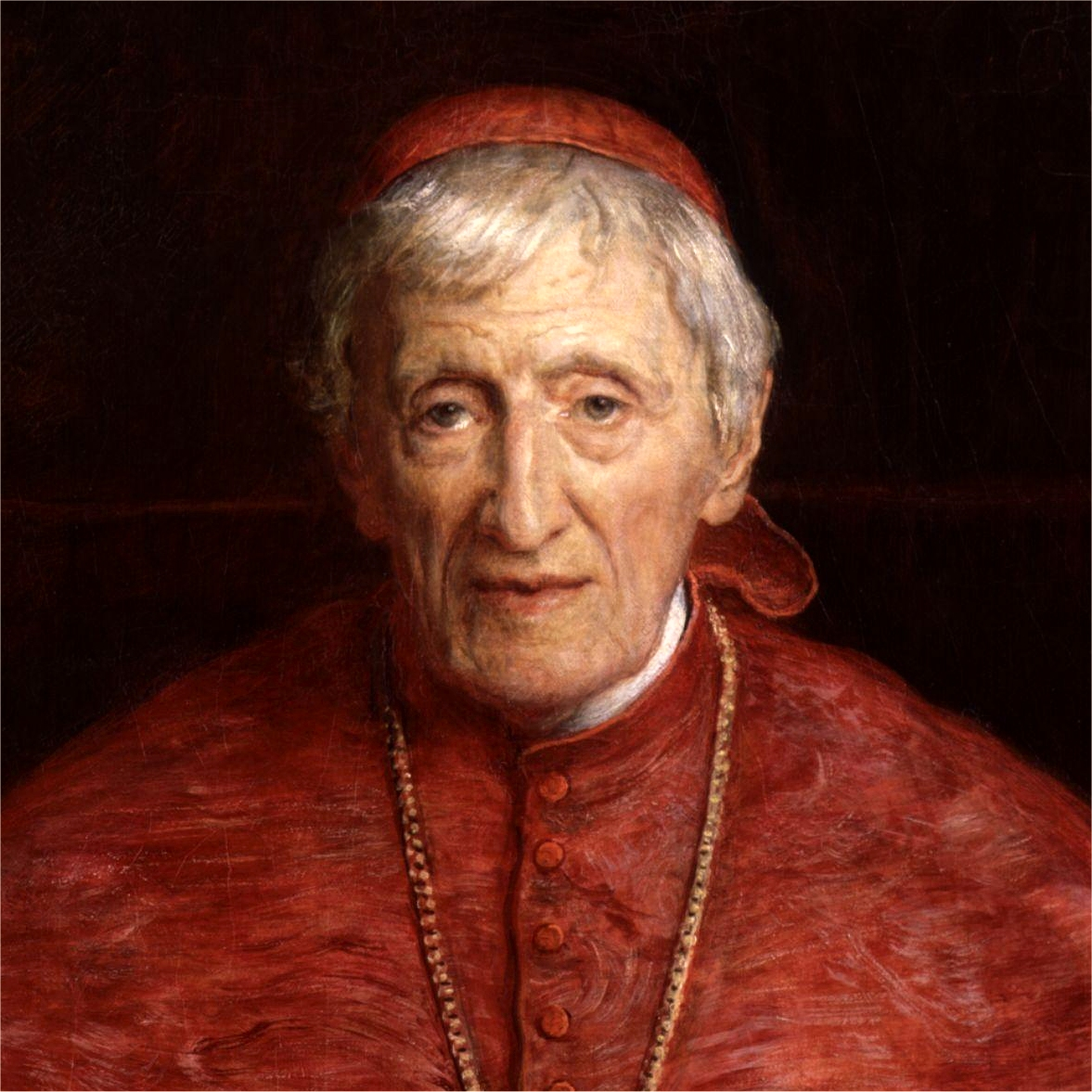
Cardinal Newman, author of the text of The Dream of Gerontius

Elgar's biographer Basil Maine commented, "When Sir Arthur Sullivan died in 1900 it became apparent to many that Elgar, although a composer of another build, was his true successor as first musician of the land." Elgar's next major work was eagerly awaited. For the Birmingham Triennial Music Festival of 1900, he set Cardinal John Henry Newman's poem The Dream of Gerontius for soloists, chorus and orchestra. Richter conducted the premiere, which was marred by a poorly prepared chorus, which sang badly. Critics recognised the mastery of the piece despite the defects in performance. It was performed in Düsseldorf, Germany, in 1901 and again in 1902, conducted by Julius Buths, who also conducted the European premiere of the Enigma Variations in 1901. The German press was enthusiastic. The Cologne Gazette said, "In both parts we meet with beauties of imperishable value. ... Elgar stands on the shoulders of Berlioz, Wagner, and Liszt, from whose influences he has freed himself until he has become an important individuality. He is one of the leaders of musical art of modern times." The Düsseldorfer Volksblatt wrote, "A memorable and epoch-making first performance! Since the days of Liszt nothing has been produced in the way of oratorio ... which reaches the greatness and importance of this sacred cantata." Richard Strauss, then widely viewed as the leading composer of his day, was so impressed that in Elgar's presence he proposed a toast to the success of "the first English progressive musician, Meister Elgar." (Note: Strauss and Elgar remained on friendly terms for the rest of Elgar's life, and Strauss paid him a warm obituary tribute in 1934.) Performances in Vienna, Paris and New York followed, and The Dream of Gerontius soon became equally admired in Britain. According to Kennedy, "It is unquestionably the greatest British work in the oratorio form ... [it] opened a new chapter in the English choral tradition and liberated it from its Handelian preoccupation." Elgar, as a Roman Catholic, was much moved by Newman's poem about the death and redemption of a sinner, but some influential members of the Anglican establishment disagreed. His colleague, Charles Villiers Stanford complained that the work "stinks of incense". The dean of Gloucester banned Gerontius from his cathedral in 1901, and at Worcester the following year, the dean insisted on expurgations before allowing a performance.

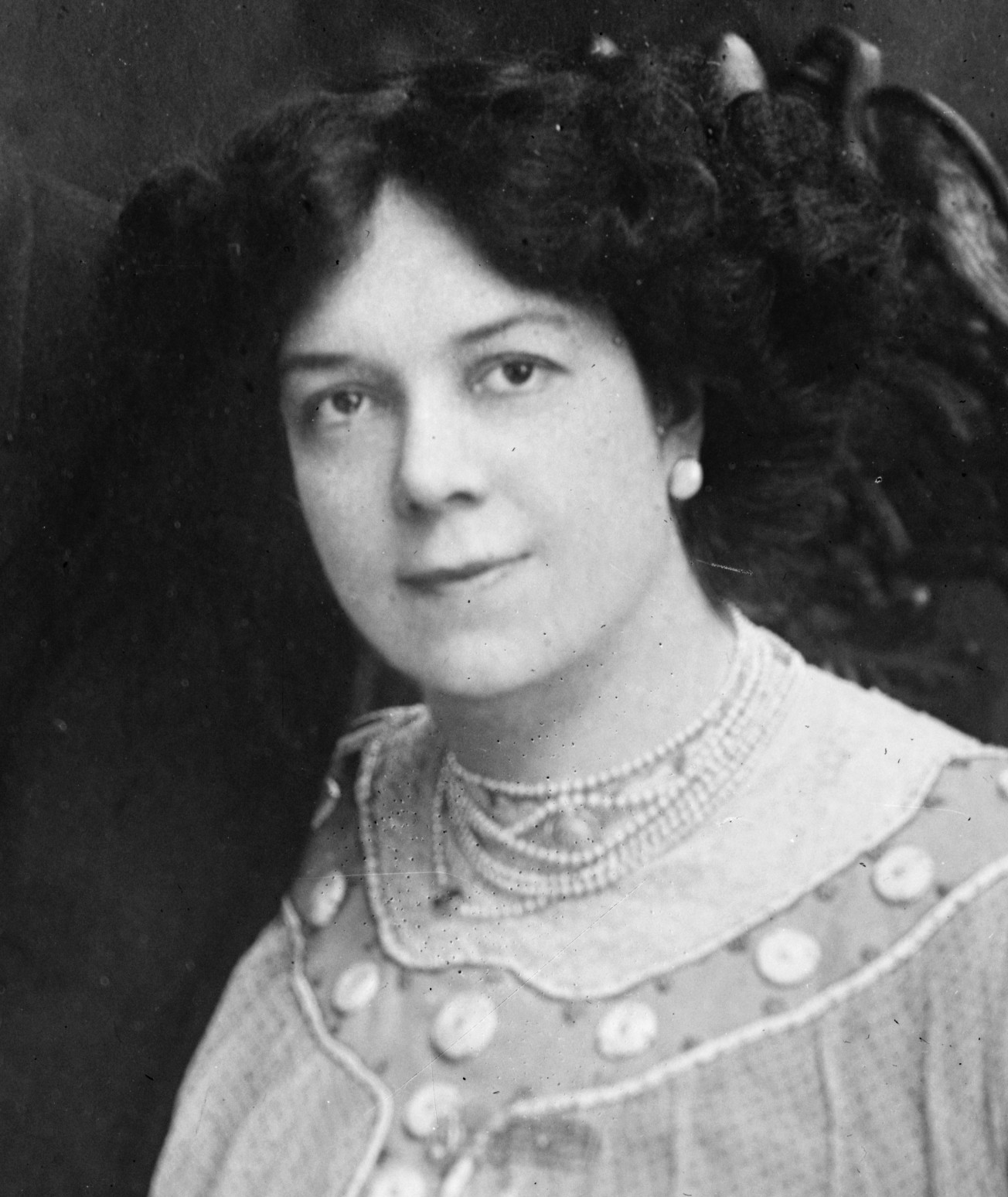
Clara Butt, first singer of Elgar's "Land of Hope and Glory"

Elgar is probably best known for the first of the five Pomp and Circumstance Marches, which were composed between 1901 and 1930. It is familiar to millions of television viewers all over the world every year who watch the Last Night of the Proms, where it is traditionally performed. When the theme of the slower middle section (technically called the "trio") of the first march came into his head, he told his friend Dora Penny, "I've got a tune that will knock 'em – will knock 'em flat". When the first march was played in 1901 at a London Promenade Concert, it was conducted by Henry Wood, who later wrote that the audience "rose and yelled ... the one and only time in the history of the Promenade concerts that an orchestral item was accorded a double encore." To mark the coronation of Edward VII and Alexandra, Elgar was commissioned to set A. C. Benson's Coronation Ode for a gala concert at the Royal Opera House on 30 June 1902. The approval of the king was confirmed, and Elgar began work. The contralto Clara Butt had persuaded him that the trio of the first Pomp and Circumstance march could have words fitted to it, and Elgar invited Benson to do so. Elgar incorporated the new vocal version into the Ode. The publishers of the score recognised the potential of the vocal piece, "Land of Hope and Glory", and asked Benson and Elgar to make a further revision for publication as a separate song. It was immensely popular and is now considered an unofficial British national anthem. In the United States, the trio, known simply as "Pomp and Circumstance" or "The Graduation March", has been adopted since 1905 for virtually all high school and university graduations.

In March 1904 a three-day festival of Elgar's works was presented at Covent Garden, an honour never before given to any English composer. The Times commented, "Four or five years ago if any one had predicted that the Opera-house would be full from floor to ceiling for the performance of an oratorio by an English composer he would probably have been supposed to be out of his mind." The king and queen attended the first concert, at which Richter conducted The Dream of Gerontius, and returned the next evening for the second, the London premiere of The Apostles (first heard the previous year at the Birmingham Festival). The final concert of the festival, conducted by Elgar, was primarily orchestral, apart for an excerpt from Caractacus and the complete Sea Pictures (sung by Clara Butt). The orchestral items were Froissart, the Enigma Variations, Cockaigne, the first two (at that time the only two) Pomp and Circumstance marches, and the premiere of a new orchestral work, In the South, inspired by a holiday in Italy.

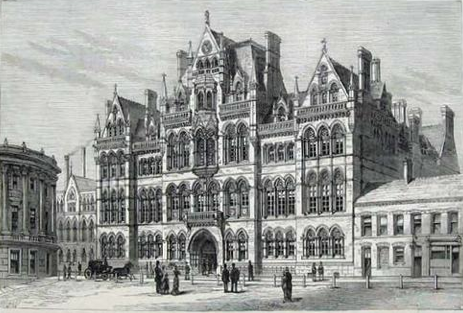
Mason College, which housed the Faculty of Arts at the University of Birmingham when Elgar was Peyton Professor of Music

Elgar was knighted at Buckingham Palace on 5 July 1904. The following month, he and his family moved to Plâs Gwyn, a large house on the outskirts of Hereford, overlooking the River Wye, where they lived until 1911. Between 1902 and 1914, Elgar was, in Kennedy's words, at the zenith of popularity. He made four visits to the US, including one conducting tour, and earned considerable fees from the performance of his music. Between 1905 and 1908, he held the post of Peyton Professor of Music at the University of Birmingham. He had accepted the post reluctantly, feeling that a composer should not head a school of music. He was not at ease in the role, and his lectures caused controversy, with his attacks on the critics (Note: Elgar's principal target was J.A. Fuller Maitland, music critic of The Times, whose patronising obituary of Arthur Sullivan repelled Elgar; in his Birmingham lectures he alluded to it as "the shady side of musical criticism ... that foul unforgettable episode.") and on English music in general: "Vulgarity in the course of time may be refined. Vulgarity often goes with inventiveness ... but the commonplace mind can never be anything but commonplace. An Englishman will take you into a large room, beautifully proportioned, and will point out to you that it is white – all over white – and somebody will say, 'What exquisite taste'. You know in your own mind, in your own soul, that it is not taste at all, that it is the want of taste, that is mere evasion. English music is white, and evades everything." He regretted the controversy and was glad to hand on the post to his friend Granville Bantock in 1908. His new life as a celebrity was a mixed blessing to the highly strung Elgar, as it interrupted his privacy, and he often was in ill-health. He complained to Jaeger in 1903, "My life is one continual giving up of little things which I love." Both W. S. Gilbert and Thomas Hardy sought to collaborate with Elgar in this decade. Elgar refused, but would have collaborated with Bernard Shaw had Shaw been willing.

Elgar paid three visits to the USA between 1905 and 1911. His first was to conduct his music and to accept a doctorate from Yale University. (Note: This was the occasion on which the American tradition of playing the trio of the first Pomp and Circumstance March at graduation ceremonies originated. On that occasion Elgar met Horatio Parker, composer and dean of the Department of Music at Yale, who then played "Pomp and Circumstance" on the organ. It may have been this meeting that lead to an invitation to contribute some songs to a specially designed series of music instruction books for children of which Parker was principal editor. For that series Elgar wrote three little songs: The Merry-go-round, The Brook, and The Windlass Song.) His principal composition in 1905 was the Introduction and Allegro for Strings, dedicated to Samuel Sanford. It was well received but did not catch the public imagination as The Dream of Gerontius had done and continued to do. Among keen Elgarians, however, The Kingdom was sometimes preferred to the earlier work: Elgar's friend Frank Schuster told the young Adrian Boult: "compared with The Kingdom, Gerontius is the work of a raw amateur."

As Elgar approached his fiftieth birthday, he began work on his first symphony, a project that had been in his mind in various forms for nearly ten years. His First Symphony (1908) was a national and international triumph. Within weeks of the premiere it was performed in New York under Walter Damrosch, Vienna under Ferdinand Löwe, St Petersburg under Alexander Siloti, and Leipzig under Arthur Nikisch. There were performances in Rome, Chicago, Boston, Toronto and fifteen British towns and cities. In just over a year, it received a hundred performances in Britain, America and continental Europe.

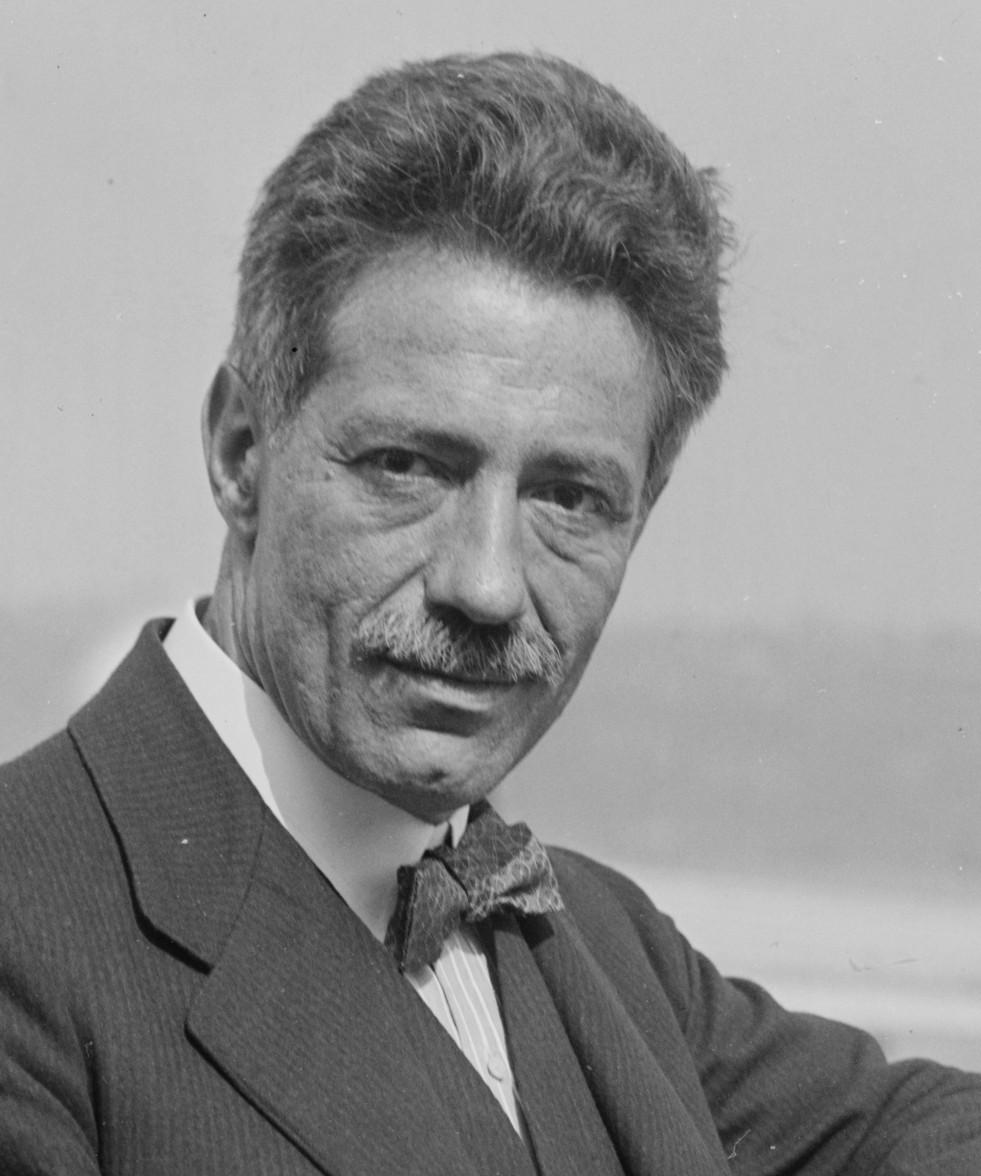
Fritz Kreisler, dedicatee of Elgar's Violin Concerto

The Violin Concerto (1910) was commissioned by Fritz Kreisler, one of the leading international violinists of the time. Elgar wrote it during the summer of 1910, with occasional help from W. H. Reed, the leader of the London Symphony Orchestra (LSO), who helped the composer with advice on technical points. Elgar and Reed formed a firm friendship, which lasted for the rest of Elgar's life. Reed's biography, Elgar As I Knew Him (1936), records many details of Elgar's methods of composition. The work was presented by the Royal Philharmonic Society, with Kreisler and the LSO, conducted by the composer. Reed recalled, "the Concerto proved to be a complete triumph, the concert a brilliant and unforgettable occasion." So great was the impact of the concerto that Kreisler's rival Eugène Ysaÿe spent much time with Elgar going through the work. There was great disappointment when contractual difficulties prevented Ysaÿe from playing it in London.

The Violin Concerto was Elgar's last popular triumph. The following year he presented his Second Symphony in London, but was disappointed at its reception. Unlike the First Symphony, it ends not in a blaze of orchestral splendour but quietly and contemplatively. Reed, who played at the premiere, later wrote that Elgar was recalled to the platform several times to acknowledge the applause, "but missed that unmistakable note perceived when an audience, even an English audience, is thoroughly roused or worked up, as it was after the Violin Concerto or the First Symphony." Elgar asked Reed, "What is the matter with them, Billy? They sit there like a lot of stuffed pigs." The work was, by normal standards, a success, with twenty-seven performances within three years of its premiere, but it did not achieve the international furore of the First Symphony.

Elgar aged about 60

=== Last major works ===
In June 1911, as part of the celebrations surrounding the coronation of King George V, Elgar was appointed to the Order of Merit, an honour limited to twenty-four holders at any time. The following year, the Elgars moved back to London, to a large house in Netherhall Gardens, Hampstead, designed by Norman Shaw. There Elgar composed his last two large-scale works of the pre-war era, the choral ode, The Music Makers (for the Birmingham Festival, 1912) and the symphonic study Falstaff (for the Leeds Festival, 1913). Both were received politely but without enthusiasm. Even the dedicatee of Falstaff, the conductor Landon Ronald, confessed privately that he could not "make head or tail of the piece", while the musical scholar Percy Scholes wrote of Falstaff that it was a "great work" but, "so far as public appreciation goes, a comparative failure".

When World War I broke out, Elgar was horrified at the prospect of the carnage, but his patriotic feelings were nonetheless aroused. He composed "A Song for Soldiers", which he later withdrew. He signed up as a special constable in the local police and later joined the Hampstead Volunteer Reserve of the army. He composed patriotic works, Carillon, a recitation for speaker and orchestra in honour of Belgium, and Polonia, an orchestral piece in honour of Poland. "Land of Hope and Glory", already popular, became still more so, and Elgar wished in vain to have new, less nationalistic, words sung to the tune.

Laurence Binyon (top) and Rudyard Kipling, whose verses Elgar set during World War I

Elgar's other compositions during the war included incidental music for a children's play, The Starlight Express (1915); a ballet, The Sanguine Fan (1917); and The Spirit of England (1915–1917, to poems by Laurence Binyon), three choral settings very different in character from the romantic patriotism of his earlier years. His last large-scale composition of the war years was The Fringes of the Fleet, settings of verses by Rudyard Kipling, performed with great popular success around the country, until Kipling for unexplained reasons objected to their performance in theatres. Elgar conducted a recording of the work for the Gramophone Company.

Towards the end of the war, Elgar was in poor health. His wife thought it best for him to move to the countryside, and she rented "Brinkwells", a house near Fittleworth in Sussex, from the painter Rex Vicat Cole. There Elgar recovered his strength and, in 1918 and 1919, he produced four large-scale works. The first three of these were chamber pieces: the Violin Sonata in E minor, the Piano Quintet in A minor, and the String Quartet in E minor. On hearing the work in progress, Alice Elgar wrote in her diary, "E. writing wonderful new music". All three works were well received. The Times wrote, "Elgar's sonata contains much that we have heard before in other forms, but as we do not at all want him to change and be somebody else, that is as it should be." The quartet and quintet were premiered at the Wigmore Hall on 21 May 1919. The Manchester Guardian wrote, "This quartet, with its tremendous climaxes, curious refinements of dance-rhythms, and its perfect symmetry, and the quintet, more lyrical and passionate, are as perfect examples of chamber music as the great oratorios were of their type."

Cello Concerto – IV. Allegro
Performed by the Skidmore College Orchestra.

By contrast, the remaining work, the Cello Concerto in E minor, had a disastrous premiere, at the opening concert of the LSO's 1919–20 season in October 1919. Apart from the Elgar work, which the composer conducted, the rest of the programme was conducted by Albert Coates, who overran his rehearsal time at the expense of Elgar's. Lady Elgar wrote, "that brutal selfish ill-mannered bounder ... that brute Coates went on rehearsing." The critic of The Observer, Ernest Newman, wrote, "There have been rumours about during the week of inadequate rehearsal. Whatever the explanation, the sad fact remains that never, in all probability, has so great an orchestra made so lamentable an exhibition of itself. ... The work itself is lovely stuff, very simple – that pregnant simplicity that has come upon Elgar's music in the last couple of years – but with a profound wisdom and beauty underlying its simplicity." Elgar attached no blame to his soloist, Felix Salmond, who played the work for him again later. In contrast with the First Symphony and its hundred performances in just over a year, the Cello Concerto did not have a second performance in London for more than a year.

=== Last years ===
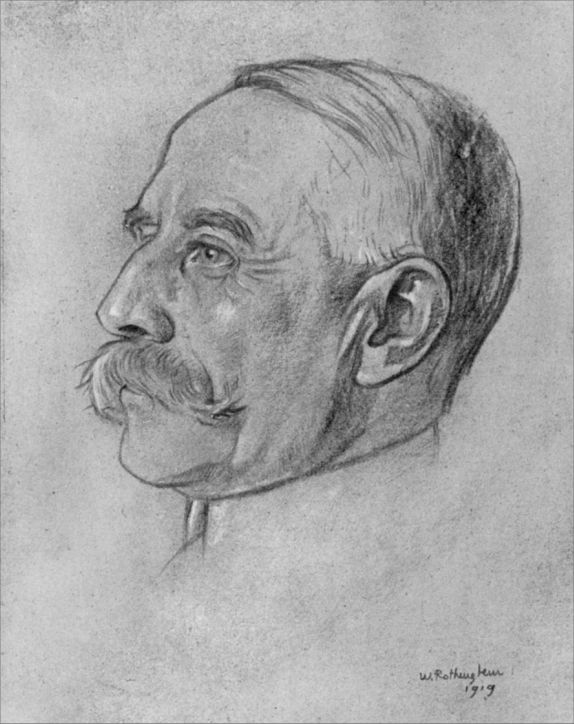
Elgar in 1919, by William Rothenstein

Although in the 1920s Elgar's music was no longer in fashion, his admirers continued to present his works when possible. Reed singles out a performance of the Second Symphony in March 1920 conducted by "a young man almost unknown to the public", Adrian Boult, for bringing "the grandeur and nobility of the work" to a wider public. Also in 1920, Landon Ronald presented an all-Elgar concert at the Queen's Hall. Alice Elgar wrote with enthusiasm about the reception of the symphony, but this was one of the last times she heard Elgar's music played in public. After a short illness, she died of lung cancer on 7 April 1920, at the age of seventy-two.

Elgar was devastated by the loss of his wife. With no public demand for new works, and deprived of Alice's constant support and inspiration, he allowed himself to be deflected from composition. His daughter later wrote that Elgar inherited from his father a reluctance to "settle down to work on hand but could cheerfully spend hours over some perfectly unnecessary and entirely unremunerative undertaking", a trait that became stronger after Alice's death. For much of the rest of his life, Elgar indulged himself in his several hobbies. Throughout his life he was a keen amateur chemist, sometimes using a laboratory in his back garden. He invented the "Elgar Sulphuretted Hydrogen Apparatus", and decided to seek a patent for it. He enjoyed football, supporting Wolverhampton Wanderers F.C., for whom he composed an anthem, "He Banged the Leather for Goal", and in his later years he frequently attended horseraces. His protégés, the conductor Malcolm Sargent and violinist Yehudi Menuhin, both recalled rehearsals with Elgar at which he swiftly satisfied himself that all was well and then went off to the races. In his younger days, Elgar had been an enthusiastic cyclist, buying Royal Sunbeam bicycles for himself and his wife in 1903 (he named his "Mr. Phoebus"). As an elderly widower, he enjoyed being driven about the countryside by his chauffeur. In November and December 1923, he took a voyage to Brazil, journeying up the Amazon to Manaus, where he was impressed by its opera house, the Teatro Amazonas. Almost nothing is recorded about Elgar's activities or the events that he encountered during the trip, which gave the novelist James Hamilton-Paterson considerable latitude when writing Gerontius, a fictional account of the journey.

After Alice's death, Elgar sold the Hampstead house, and after living for a short time in a flat in St James's in the heart of London, he moved back to Worcestershire, to the village of Kempsey, where he lived from 1923 to 1927. He did not wholly abandon composition in these years. He made large-scale symphonic arrangements of works by Bach and Handel and wrote his Empire March and eight songs Pageant of Empire for the 1924 British Empire Exhibition. Shortly after these were published, he was appointed Master of the King's Musick on 13 May 1924, following the death of Sir Walter Parratt.

From 1926 onwards, Elgar made a series of recordings of his own works. Described by the music writer Robert Philip as "the first composer to take the gramophone seriously", he had already recorded much of his music by the early acoustic-recording process for His Master's Voice (HMV) from 1914 onwards, but the introduction of electrical microphones in 1925 transformed the gramophone from a novelty into a realistic medium for reproducing orchestral and choral music. Elgar was the first composer to take full advantage of this technological advance. Fred Gaisberg of HMV, who produced Elgar's recordings, set up a series of sessions to capture on disc the composer's interpretations of his major orchestral works, including the Enigma Variations, Falstaff, the first and second symphonies, and the cello and violin concertos. For most of these, the orchestra was the LSO, but the Variations were played by the Royal Albert Hall Orchestra. Later in the series of recordings, Elgar also conducted two newly founded orchestras, Boult's BBC Symphony Orchestra and Sir Thomas Beecham's London Philharmonic Orchestra.

Elgar's recordings were released on 78-rpm discs by both HMV and RCA Victor. After World War II, the 1932 recording of the Violin Concerto with the teenage Menuhin as soloist remained available on 78 and later on LP, but the other recordings were out of the catalogues for some years. When they were reissued by EMI on LP in the 1970s, they caused surprise to many by their fast tempi, in contrast to the slower speeds adopted by many conductors in the years since Elgar's death. The recordings were reissued on CD in the 1990s.

Trio of Pomp and Circumstance Marches No. 1
Conducted by Elgar in 1931 at the opening of EMI's studios

In November 1931, Elgar was filmed by Pathé for a newsreel depicting a recording session of Pomp and Circumstance March No. 1 at the opening of EMI's Abbey Road Studios in London. It is believed to be the only surviving sound film of Elgar, who makes a brief remark before conducting the LSO, asking the musicians to "play this tune as though you've never heard it before." A memorial plaque to Elgar at Abbey Road was unveiled on 24 June 1993.

A late piece of Elgar's, the Nursery Suite, was an early example of a studio premiere: its first performance was in the Abbey Road studios. For this work, dedicated to the wife and daughters of the Duke of York, Elgar once again drew on his youthful sketch-books. (Note: The elder daughter was Princess Elizabeth of York (later Queen Elizabeth II).)

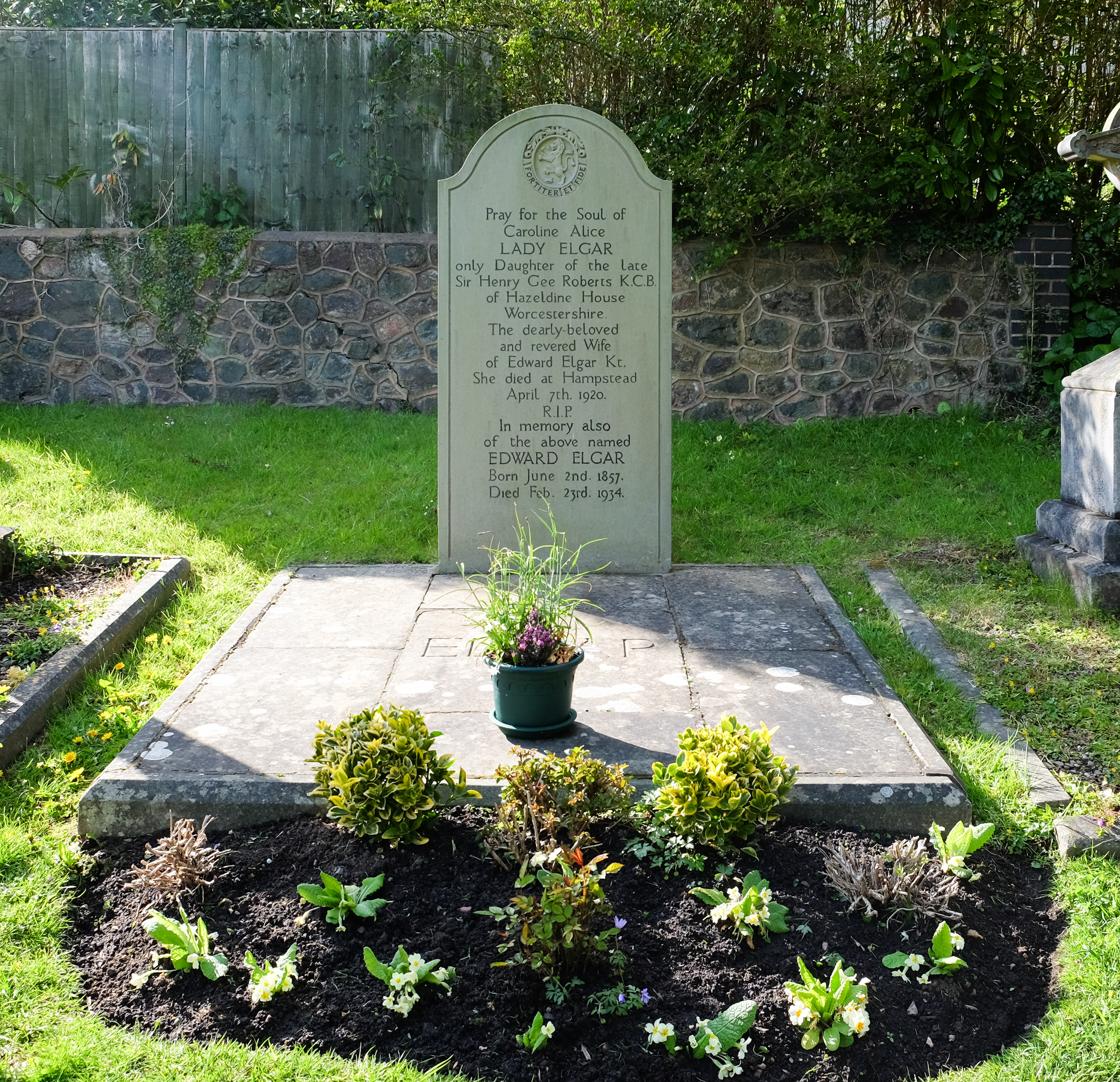
Elgar family grave at St Wulstan's Roman Catholic Church, Little Malvern

In his final years, Elgar experienced a musical revival. The BBC organised a festival of his works to celebrate his seventy-fifth birthday, in 1932. He flew to Paris in 1933 to conduct the Violin Concerto for Menuhin. While in France, he visited his fellow composer Frederick Delius at his house at Grez-sur-Loing. He was sought out by younger musicians such as Adrian Boult, Malcolm Sargent and John Barbirolli, who championed his music when it was out of fashion. He began work on an opera, The Spanish Lady, and accepted a commission from the BBC to compose a Third Symphony. His final illness prevented their completion. He fretted about the unfinished works. He asked Reed to ensure that nobody would "tinker" with the sketches and attempt a completion of the symphony, but at other times he said, "If I can't complete the Third Symphony, somebody will complete it – or write a better one." After Elgar's death, Percy M. Young, in co-operation with the BBC and Elgar's daughter Carice, produced a version of The Spanish Lady, which was issued on CD. The Third Symphony sketches were elaborated by the composer Anthony Payne into a complete score in 1997.

Inoperable colorectal cancer was discovered during an operation on 8 October 1933. He told his consulting doctor, Arthur Thomson, that he had no faith in an afterlife: "I believe there is nothing but complete oblivion." Elgar died on 23 February 1934 at the age of seventy-six and was buried next to his wife at St Wulstan's Roman Catholic Church in Little Malvern.

== Music ==
=== Influences, antecedents and early works ===
Elgar was contemptuous of folk music and had little interest in or respect for the early English composers, calling William Byrd and his contemporaries "museum pieces". Of later English composers, he regarded Purcell as the greatest, and he said that he had learned much of his own technique from studying Hubert Parry's writings. The continental composers who most influenced Elgar were Handel, Dvořák and, to some degree, Brahms. In Elgar's chromaticism, the influence of Wagner is apparent, but Elgar's individual style of orchestration owes much to the clarity of nineteenth-century French composers, Berlioz, Massenet, Saint-Saëns and, particularly, Delibes, whose music Elgar played and conducted at Worcester and greatly admired.

Elgar began composing when still a child, and all his life he drew on his early sketchbooks for themes and inspiration. The habit of assembling his compositions, even large-scale ones, from scraps of themes jotted down randomly remained throughout his life. His early adult works included violin and piano pieces, music for the wind quintet in which he and his brother played between 1878 and 1881, and music of many types for the Powick Asylum band. Diana McVeagh in Grove's Dictionary finds many embryonic Elgarian touches in these pieces, but few of them are regularly played, except Salut d'Amour and (as arranged decades later into The Wand of Youth Suites) some of the childhood sketches. Elgar's sole work of note during his first spell in London in 1889–1891, the overture Froissart, was a romantic-bravura piece, influenced by Mendelssohn and Wagner, but also showing further Elgarian characteristics. Orchestral works composed during the subsequent years in Worcestershire include the Serenade for Strings and Three Bavarian Dances. In this period and later, Elgar wrote songs and part songs. W. H. Reed expressed reservations about these pieces, but praised the part song The Snow, for female voices, and Sea Pictures, a cycle of five songs for contralto and orchestra which remains in the repertory.

Elgar's principal large-scale early works were for chorus and orchestra for the Three Choirs and other festivals. These were The Black Knight, King Olaf, The Light of Life, The Banner of St George and Caractacus. He also wrote a Te Deum and Benedictus for the Hereford Festival. Of these, McVeagh comments favourably on his lavish orchestration and innovative use of leitmotifs, but less favourably on the qualities of his chosen texts and the patchiness of his inspiration. McVeagh makes the point that, because these works of the 1890s were for many years little known (and performances remain rare), the mastery of his first great success, the Enigma Variations, appeared to be a sudden transformation from mediocrity to genius, but in fact his orchestral skills had been building up throughout the decade.

=== Peak creative years ===
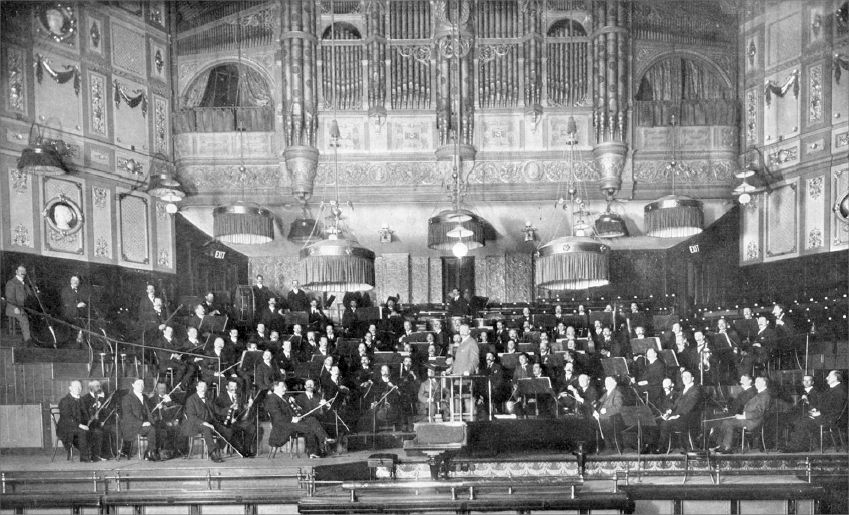
Elgar and the London Symphony Orchestra at the Queen's Hall

Elgar's best-known works were composed within the twenty-one years between 1899 and 1920. Most of them are orchestral. Reed wrote, "Elgar's genius rose to its greatest height in his orchestral works" and quoted the composer as saying that, even in his oratorios, the orchestral part is the most important. The Enigma Variations made Elgar's name nationally. The variation form was ideal for him at this stage of his career, when his comprehensive mastery of orchestration was still in contrast to his tendency to write his melodies in short, sometimes rigid, phrases. His next orchestral works, Cockaigne, a concert-overture (1900–1901), the first two Pomp and Circumstance marches (1901), and the gentle Dream Children (1902), are all short: the longest of them, Cockaigne, lasting less than fifteen minutes. In the South (1903–1904), although designated by Elgar as a concert-overture, is, according to Kennedy, really a tone poem and the longest continuous piece of purely orchestral writing Elgar had essayed. He wrote it after setting aside an early attempt to compose a symphony. The work reveals his continuing progress in writing sustained themes and orchestral lines, although some critics, including Kennedy, find that in the middle part "Elgar's inspiration burns at less than its brightest." In 1905 Elgar completed the Introduction and Allegro for Strings. This work is based, unlike much of Elgar's earlier writing, not on a profusion of themes but on only three. Kennedy called it a "masterly composition, equalled among English works for strings only by Vaughan Williams's Tallis Fantasia."

During the next four years Elgar composed three major concert pieces, which, though shorter than comparable works by some of his European contemporaries, are among the most substantial such works by an English composer. These were his First Symphony, Violin Concerto, and Second Symphony, which all play for between forty-five minutes and an hour. (Note: In a series of transfers of the composer's electrical recordings available in 2010, the timings are: Symphony No. 1: 46:28 (Naxos Historical CD 8.111256); Symphony No. 2: 48:30 (Naxos Historical CD 8.111260); Violin Concerto: 49:57 (Naxos Historical CD 8.110902).) McVeagh says of the symphonies that they "rank high not only in Elgar's output but in English musical history. Both are long and powerful, without published programmes, only hints and quotations to indicate some inward drama from which they derive their vitality and eloquence. Both are based on classical form but differ from it to the extent that ... they were considered prolix and slackly constructed by some critics. Certainly the invention in them is copious; each symphony would need several dozen music examples to chart its progress."

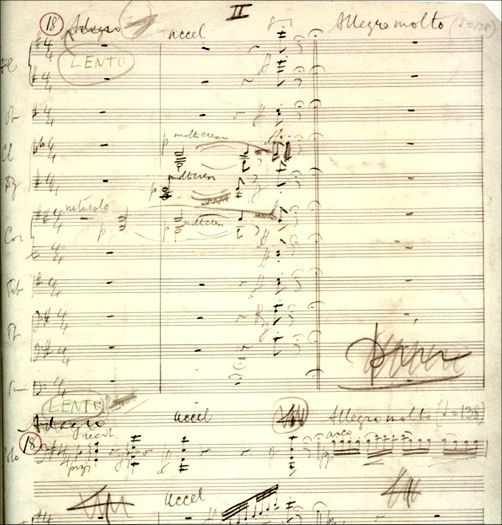
Fragment of manuscript of the opening of the second movement of the Cello Concerto

Elgar's Violin Concerto and Cello Concerto, in the view of Kennedy, "rank not only among his finest works, but among the greatest of their kind". They are, however, very different from each other. The Violin Concerto, composed in 1909 as Elgar reached the height of his popularity, and written for the instrument dearest to his heart, is lyrical throughout and rhapsodical and brilliant by turns. The Cello Concerto, composed a decade later, immediately after World War I, seems, in Kennedy's words, "to belong to another age, another world ... the simplest of all Elgar's major works ... also the least grandiloquent." Between the two concertos came Elgar's symphonic study Falstaff, which has divided opinion even among Elgar's strongest admirers. Donald Tovey viewed it as "one of the immeasurably great things in music", with power "identical with Shakespeare's", while Kennedy criticises the work for "too frequent reliance on sequences" and an over-idealised depiction of the female characters. Reed thought that the principal themes show less distinction than some of Elgar's earlier works. Elgar himself thought Falstaff the highest point of his purely orchestral work.

The major works for voices and orchestra of the twenty-one years of Elgar's middle period are three large-scale works for soloists, chorus and orchestra: The Dream of Gerontius (1900), and the oratorios The Apostles (1903) and The Kingdom (1906); and two shorter odes, the Coronation Ode (1902) and The Music Makers (1912). The first of the odes, as a pièce d'occasion, has rarely been revived after its initial success, with the culminating "Land of Hope and Glory". The second is, for Elgar, unusual in that it contains several quotations from his earlier works, as Richard Strauss quoted himself in Ein Heldenleben. The choral works were all successful, although the first, Gerontius, was and remains the best-loved and most performed. On the manuscript Elgar wrote, quoting John Ruskin, "This is the best of me; for the rest, I ate, and drank, and slept, loved and hated, like another. My life was as the vapour, and is not; but this I saw, and knew; this, if anything of mine, is worth your memory." All three of the large-scale works follow the traditional model with sections for soloists, chorus and both together. Elgar's distinctive orchestration, as well as his melodic inspiration, lifts them to a higher level than most of their British predecessors.

Elgar's other works of his middle period include incidental music for Grania and Diarmid, a play by George Moore and W. B. Yeats (1901), and for The Starlight Express, a play based on a story by Algernon Blackwood (1916). Of the former, Yeats called Elgar's music "wonderful in its heroic melancholy". Elgar also wrote a number of songs during his peak period, of which Reed observes, "it cannot be said that he enriched the vocal repertory to the same extent as he did that of the orchestra."

=== Final years and posthumous completions ===
After the Cello Concerto, Elgar completed no more large-scale works. He made arrangements of works by Bach, Handel and Chopin, in distinctively Elgarian orchestration, and once again turned his youthful notebooks to use for the Nursery Suite (1931). His other compositions of this period have not held a place in the regular repertory. For most of the rest of the twentieth century, it was generally agreed that Elgar's creative impulse ceased after his wife's death. Anthony Payne's elaboration of the sketches for Elgar's Third Symphony into a complete score led to a reconsideration of this supposition. Elgar left the opening of the symphony complete in full score, and those pages, along with others, show Elgar's orchestration changed markedly from the richness of his pre-war work. The Gramophone described the opening of the new work as something "thrilling ... unforgettably gaunt". Its first public performance was given by the BBC Symphony Orchestra under Andrew Davis in London on 15 February 1998. Payne also subsequently produced a performing version of the sketches for a sixth Pomp and Circumstance March, premiered at the Proms in August 2006. Elgar's sketches for a piano concerto dating from 1913 were elaborated by the composer Robert Walker and first performed in August 1997 by the pianist David Owen Norris. The realisation has since been extensively revised.

=== Reputation ===
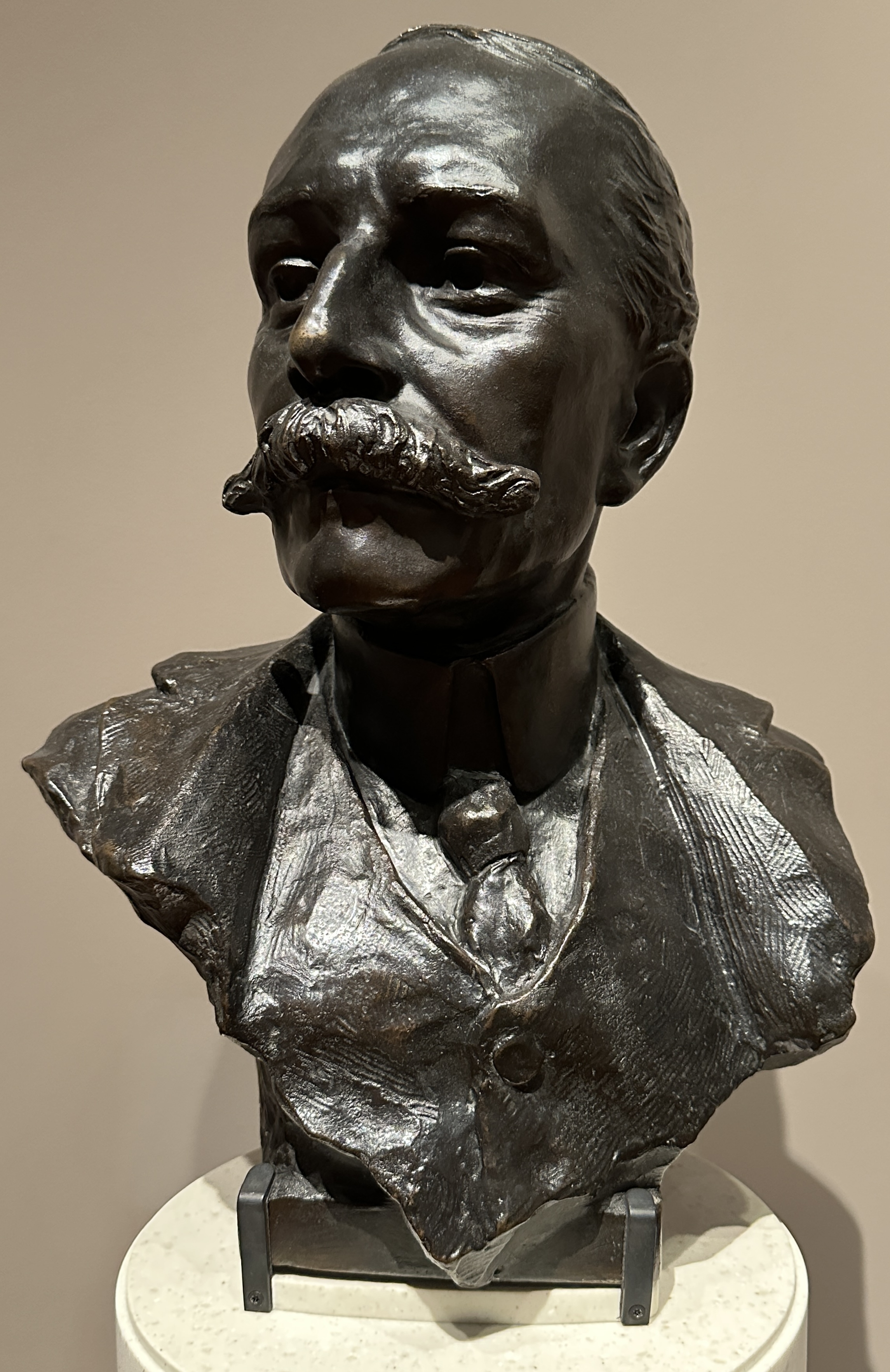
Elgar, by Percival Hedley, 1905

Views of Elgar's stature have varied in the decades since his music came to prominence at the beginning of the twentieth century. Richard Strauss, as noted, hailed Elgar as a progressive composer; even the hostile reviewer in The Observer, unimpressed by the thematic material of the First Symphony in 1908, called the orchestration "magnificently modern". Hans Richter rated Elgar as "the greatest modern composer" in any country, and Richter's colleague Arthur Nikisch considered the First Symphony "a masterpiece of the first order" to be "justly ranked with the great symphonic models – Beethoven and Brahms." By contrast, the critic W. J. Turner, in the mid-twentieth century, wrote of Elgar's "Salvation Army symphonies", and Herbert von Karajan called the Enigma Variations "second-hand Brahms". Elgar's immense popularity was not long-lived. After the success of his First Symphony and Violin Concerto, his Second Symphony and Cello Concerto were politely received but without the earlier wild enthusiasm. His music was identified in the public mind with the Edwardian era, and after the First World War he no longer seemed a progressive or modern composer. In the early 1920s, even the First Symphony had only one London performance in more than three years. Wood and younger conductors such as Boult, Sargent and Barbirolli championed Elgar's music, but in the recording catalogues and the concert programmes of the middle of the century his works were not well represented.

In 1924, the music scholar Edward J. Dent wrote an article for a German music journal in which he identified four features of Elgar's style that gave offence to a section of English opinion (namely, Dent indicated, the academic and snobbish section): "too emotional", "not quite free from vulgarity", "pompous", and "too deliberately noble in expression". This article was reprinted in 1930 and caused controversy. In the later years of the century there was, in Britain at least, a revival of interest in Elgar's music. The features that had offended austere taste in the inter-war years were seen from a different perspective. In 1955, the reference book The Record Guide wrote of the Edwardian background during the height of Elgar's career:

Boastful self-confidence, emotional vulgarity, material extravagance, a ruthless philistinism expressed in tasteless architecture and every kind of expensive yet hideous accessory: such features of a late phase of Imperial England are faithfully reflected in Elgar's larger works and are apt to prove indigestible today. But if it is difficult to overlook the bombastic, the sentimental, and the trivial elements in his music, the effort to do so should nevertheless be made, for the sake of the many inspired pages, the power and eloquence and lofty pathos, of Elgar's best work. ... Anyone who doubts the fact of Elgar's genius should take the first opportunity of hearing The Dream of Gerontius, which remains his masterpiece, as it is his largest and perhaps most deeply felt work; the symphonic study, Falstaff; the Introduction and Allegro for Strings; the Enigma Variations; and the Violoncello Concerto.

By the 1960s, a less severe view was being taken of the Edwardian era. In 1966 the critic Frank Howes wrote that Elgar reflected the last blaze of opulence, expansiveness and full-blooded life, before World War I swept so much away. In Howes's view, there was a touch of vulgarity in both the era and Elgar's music, but "a composer is entitled to be judged by posterity for his best work. ... Elgar is historically important for giving to English music a sense of the orchestra, for expressing what it felt like to be alive in the Edwardian age, for conferring on the world at least four unqualified masterpieces, and for thereby restoring England to the comity of musical nations."

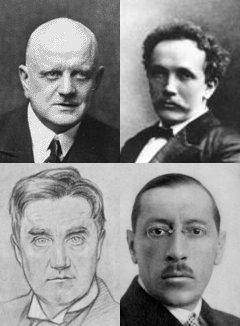
Composers who admired Elgar included (top) Sibelius (l) and Richard Strauss and (below) Vaughan Williams (l) and Stravinsky

In 1967 the critic and analyst David Cox considered the question of the supposed Englishness of Elgar's music. Cox noted that Elgar disliked folk-songs and never used them in his works, opting for an idiom that was essentially German, leavened by a lightness derived from French composers including Berlioz and Gounod. How then, asked Cox, could Elgar be "the most English of composers"? Cox found the answer in Elgar's own personality, which "could use the alien idioms in such a way as to make of them a vital form of expression that was his and his alone. And the personality that comes through in the music is English." This point about Elgar's transmuting his influences had been touched on before. In 1930 The Times wrote, "When Elgar's first symphony came out, someone attempted to prove that its main tune on which all depends was like the Grail theme in Parsifal. ... but the attempt fell flat because everyone else, including those who disliked the tune, had instantly recognized it as typically 'Elgarian', while the Grail theme is as typically Wagnerian." As for Elgar's "Englishness", his fellow-composers recognised it: Richard Strauss and Stravinsky made particular reference to it, and Sibelius called him "the personification of the true English character in music ... a noble personality and a born aristocrat". Among Elgar's admirers there is disagreement about which of his works are to be regarded as masterpieces. The Enigma Variations are generally counted among them. The Dream of Gerontius has also been given high praise by Elgarians, and the Cello Concerto is similarly rated. Many rate the Violin Concerto equally highly, but some do not. Sackville-West omitted it from the list of Elgar masterpieces in The Record Guide, and in a long analytical article in The Musical Quarterly, Daniel Gregory Mason criticised the first movement of the concerto for a "kind of sing-songiness ... as fatal to noble rhythm in music as it is in poetry". Falstaff also divides opinion. It has never been a great popular favourite, and Kennedy and Reed identify shortcomings in it. In a Musical Times 1957 centenary symposium on Elgar led by Vaughan Williams, by contrast, several contributors share Eric Blom's view that Falstaff is the greatest of all Elgar's works.

The two symphonies divide opinion even more sharply. Mason rates the Second poorly for its "over-obvious rhythmic scheme", but calls the First "Elgar's masterpiece. ... It is hard to see how any candid student can deny the greatness of this symphony." However, in the 1957 centenary symposium, several leading admirers of Elgar express reservations about one or both symphonies. In the same year, Roger Fiske wrote in The Gramophone, "For some reason few people seem to like the two Elgar symphonies equally; each has its champions and often they are more than a little bored by the rival work." The critic John Warrack wrote, "There are no sadder pages in symphonic literature than the close of the First Symphony's Adagio, as horn and trombones twice softly intone a phrase of utter grief", whereas to Michael Kennedy, the movement is notable for its lack of anguished yearning and angst and is marked instead by a "benevolent tranquillity".

Despite the fluctuating critical assessment of the various works over the years, Elgar's major works taken as a whole have in the twenty-first century recovered strongly from their neglect in the 1950s. The Record Guide in 1955 could list only one currently available recording of the First Symphony, none of the Second, one of the Violin Concerto, two of the Cello Concerto, two of the Enigma Variations, one of Falstaff, and none of The Dream of Gerontius. Since then there have been multiple recordings of all the major works. More than thirty recordings have been made of the First Symphony since 1955, for example, and more than a dozen of The Dream of Gerontius. Similarly, in the concert hall, Elgar's works, after a period of neglect, are once again frequently programmed. The Elgar Society's website, in its diary of forthcoming performances, lists performances of Elgar's works by orchestras, soloists and conductors across Europe, North America and Australasia.

== Honours, awards and commemorations ==
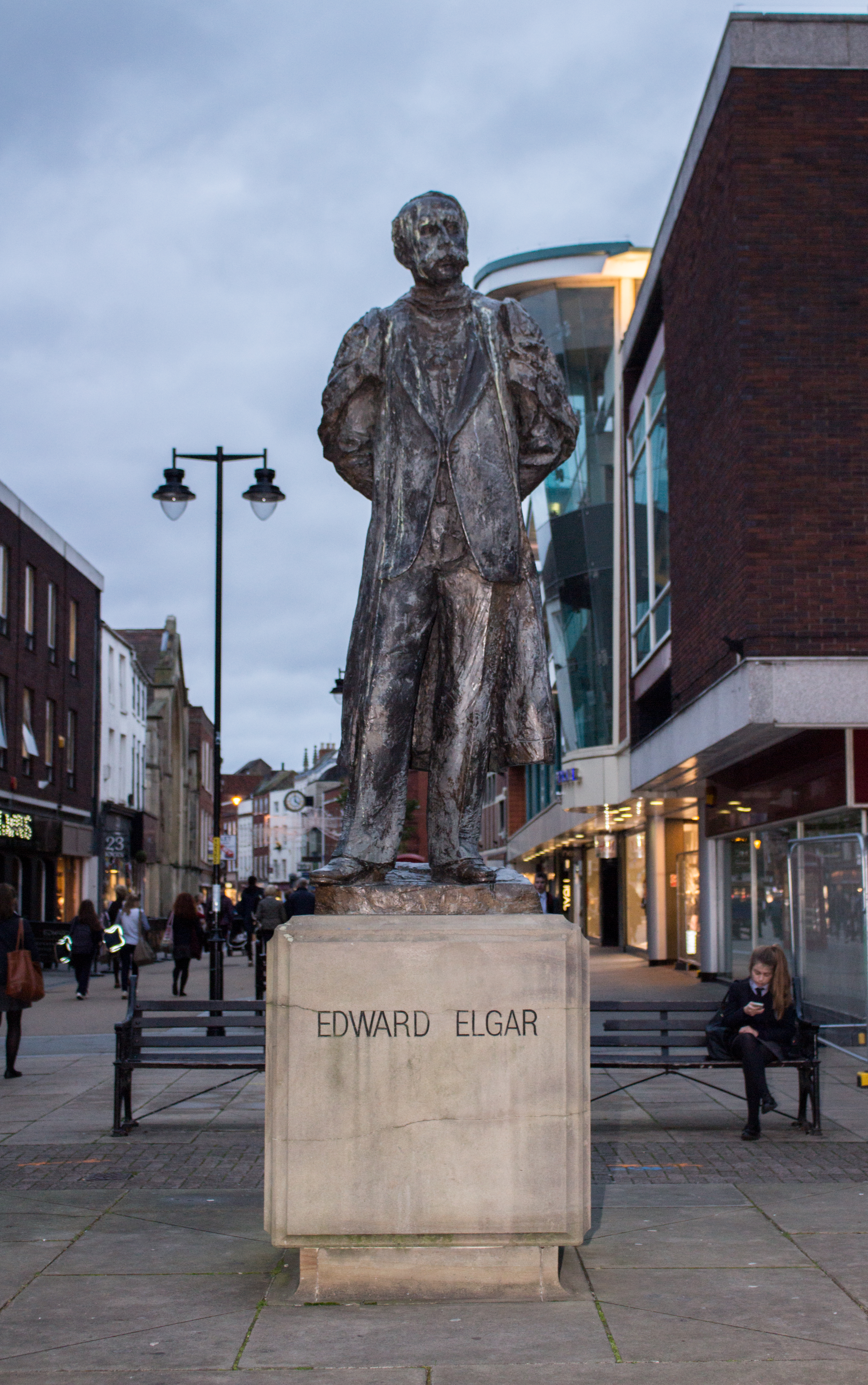
Statue, Worcester High Street

Elgar was knighted in 1904, and in 1911 he was appointed a member of the Order of Merit. In 1920 he received the Cross of Commander of the Belgian Order of the Crown; in 1924 he was made Master of the King's Musick; the following year he received the Gold Medal of the Royal Philharmonic Society; and in 1928 he was appointed a Knight Commander of the Royal Victorian Order (KCVO). Between 1900 and 1931, Elgar received honorary degrees from the Universities of Cambridge, Durham, Leeds, Oxford, Yale, Aberdeen, Western Pennsylvania, Birmingham and London. Foreign academies of which he was made a member were Regia Accademia di Santa Cecilia, Rome; Accademia del Reale Istituto Musicale, Florence; Académie des Beaux Arts, Paris; Institut de France; and the American Academy. In 1931 he was created a Baronet, of Broadheath in the County of Worcester. In 1933 he was promoted within the Royal Victorian Order to Knight Grand Cross (GCVO). In Kennedy's words, he "shamelessly touted" for a peerage, but in vain. In Who's Who, post-First World War, he claimed to have been awarded "several Imperial Russian and German decorations (lapsed)". Elgar was offered, but declined, the office of Mayor of Hereford (despite not being a member of its city council) when he lived in the city in 1905. The same year he was made an honorary freeman of the city of Worcester.

The house in Lower Broadheath where Elgar was born is now the Elgar Birthplace Museum, devoted to his life and work. Elgar's daughter, Carice, helped to found the museum in 1936 and bequeathed to it much of her collection of Elgar's letters and documents on her death in 1970. Carice left Elgar manuscripts to musical colleges: The Black Knight to Trinity College of Music; King Olaf to the Royal Academy of Music; The Music Makers to Birmingham University; the Cello Concerto to the Royal College of Music; The Kingdom to the Bodleian Library; and other manuscripts to the British Museum. The Elgar Society dedicated to the composer and his works was formed in 1951.

A memorial stone in the north choir of Westminster Abbey, placed in 1972, commemorates Elgar. In Worcester, his statue at the end of High Street stands facing the cathedral, only yards from where his father's shop once stood. Another statue of the composer by Rose Garrard is at the top of Church Street in Malvern, overlooking the town and giving visitors an opportunity to stand next to the composer in the shadow of the Hills that he so often regarded. In September 2005, a third statue sculpted by Jemma Pearson was unveiled near Hereford Cathedral in honour of his many musical and other associations with the city. It depicts Elgar with his bicycle. From 1999 until early 2007, new Bank of England twenty pound notes featured a portrait of Elgar. The change to remove his image generated controversy, particularly because 2007 was the 150th anniversary of Elgar's birth. From 2007 the Elgar notes were phased out, ceasing to be legal tender on 30 June 2010. There are around 65 roads in the UK named after Elgar, including six in the counties of Herefordshire and Worcestershire.

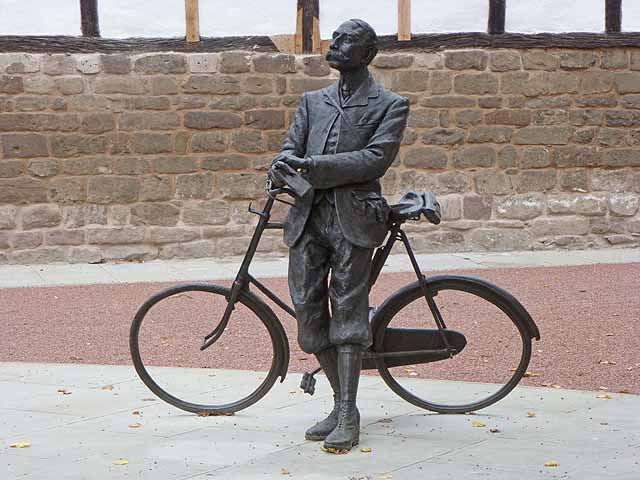
Statue of Elgar with bicycle in Hereford

Elgar's life and music have inspired works of literature including the novel Gerontius and several plays. Elgar's Rondo, a 1993 stage play by David Pownall depicts the dead Jaeger offering ghostly advice on Elgar's musical development. Pownall also wrote a radio play, Elgar's Third (1994); another Elgar-themed radio play is Alick Rowe's The Dorabella Variation (2003). David Rudkin's BBC television "Play for Today" Penda's Fen (1974) deals with themes including sex and adolescence, spying, and snobbery, with Elgar's music, chiefly The Dream of Gerontius, as its background. In one scene, a ghostly Elgar whispers the secret of the "Enigma" tune to the youthful central character, with an injunction not to reveal it. Elgar on the Journey to Hanley, a novel by Keith Alldritt (1979), tells of the composer's attachment to Dora Penny, later Mrs Powell, (depicted as "Dorabella" in the Enigma Variations).

Perhaps the best-known work depicting Elgar is Ken Russell's 1962 BBC television film Elgar, made when the composer was still largely out of fashion. This hour-long film contradicted the view of Elgar as a jingoistic and bombastic composer, and evoked the more pastoral and melancholy side of his character and music.

The 2025 film The Choral, written by Alan Bennett, is built around a fictional 1916 performance of The Dream of Gerontius by the choral society of a Yorkshire town. Elgar is portrayed by Simon Russell Beale.

== Notes and references ==
Notes

== Sources ==
- Aldous, Richard (2001). Tunes of Glory: The Life of Malcolm Sargent. London: Hutchinson. ISBN 0-09-180131-1.
- Anderson, Robert (1990). Elgar in Manuscript. London: British Library. ISBN 0-7123-0203-4.
- Buckley, R. J. (1905). Sir Edward Elgar. London: John Lane The Bodley Head. OCLC 558906223.
- Cox, David (1967). "Edward Elgar". In Simpson, Robert (ed.). The Symphony: Elgar to the Present Day. Harmondsworth: Pelican Books. OCLC 221594461.
- Howes, Frank (1971). "Edward Elgar". In Hughes, Gervase; van Thal, Herbert (eds.). The Music Lover's Companion. London: Eyre & Spottiswoode. OCLC 481972079.
- Hughes, Gervase (1960). The Music of Arthur Sullivan. London: Macmillan. OCLC 16739230.
- Kennedy, Michael (1970). Elgar: Orchestral Music. London: BBC. OCLC 252020259.
- Kennedy, Michael (1971). Barbirolli – Conductor Laureate. London: MacGibbon and Kee. ISBN 0-261-63336-8.
- Kennedy, Michael (1987a). Portrait of Elgar (third ed.). Oxford: Clarendon Press. ISBN 0-19-284017-7.
- Kennedy, Michael (1987b). Adrian Boult. London: Hamish Hamilton. ISBN 0-333-48752-4.
- McVeagh, Diana M. (2007). Elgar the Music Maker. London: Boydell Press. ISBN 978-1-84383-295-9.
- Moore, Jerrold N. (1979). Music and Friends: Letters to Adrian Boult. London: Hamish Hamilton. ISBN 0-241-10178-6.
- Moore, Jerrold N. (1984). Edward Elgar: a Creative Life. Oxford: Oxford University Press. ISBN 0-19-315447-1.
- Reed, W.H. (1946). Elgar. London: Dent. OCLC 8858707.
- Rust, Brian, ed. (1975). Gramophone Records of the First World War – An HMV Catalogue 1914–18. Newton Abbot: David & Charles. ISBN 0-7153-6842-7.
- Sackville-West, Edward; Shawe-Taylor, Desmond (1955). The Record Guide. London: Collins. OCLC 474839729.
- Wood, Henry (1938). My Life of Music. London: Victor Gollancz. OCLC 2600343.
- Young, Percy M. (1971). Sir Arthur Sullivan. London: J. M. Dent & Sons Ltd. ISBN 0-460-03934-2.
- Young, Percy M. (1973). Elgar O. M.: A Study of a Musician. London: Collins. OCLC 869820.
- Young, Percy M. (1995). Elgar, Newman, and the Dream of Gerontius: In the Tradition of English Catholicism. Aldershot: Scolar Press. ISBN 0-859-67877-6.

Court offices
| Preceded by Sir Walter Parratt | Master of the King's Musick; 1924–1934 | Succeeded by Sir Henry Walford Davies |
Baronetage of the United Kingdom
| New creation | Baronet (of Broadheath); 1931–1934 | Extinct |
