= Charles Swinnerton Heap =

English organist, pianist, composer and conductor

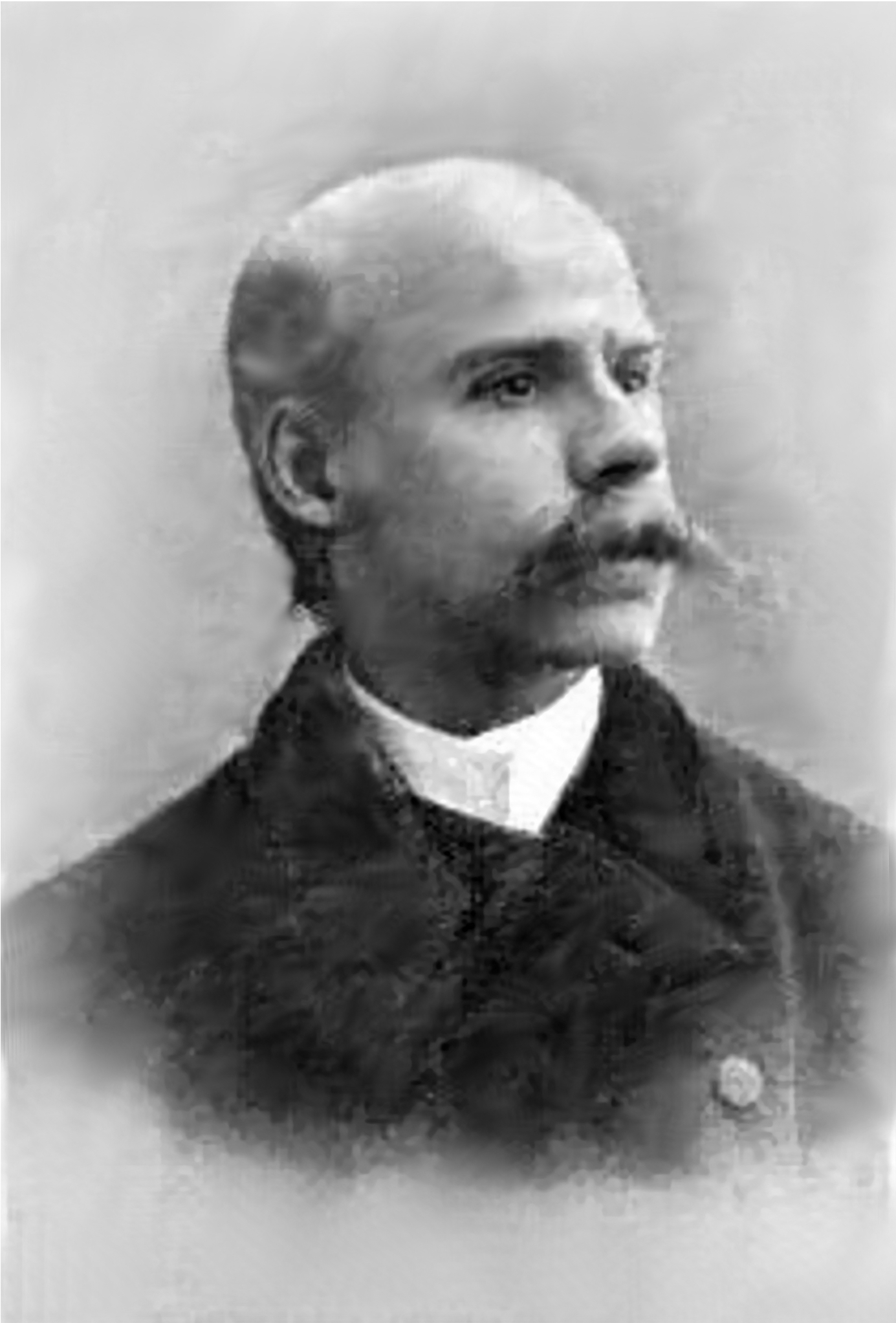
Charles Swinnerton Heap c. 1893

Charles Swinnerton Heap (10 April 1847 – 11 June 1900) was an English organist, pianist, composer and conductor.

== Life ==
Heap was born in Birmingham in 1847 and educated at the town's King Edward VI School, where he studied the organ under Walter Brooks. At the age of 11 he performed as a boy soprano at the 1858 Birmingham Festival, the first conducted by William Stockley. In 1862 he went to study under Dr. Edwin George Monk at York Minster. In 1865 he won the Mendelssohn Scholarship for young composers.

Between 1865 and 1867 he studied at the Leipzig Conservatoire with Ignaz Moscheles, Moritz Hauptmann, Ernst Richter and Carl Reinecke, sometimes deputizing for Reinecke as organist at the Gewandhaus. He then returned to study organ with W T Best, and to attend St John's College, Cambridge, where he was awarded Mus Bac. in 1871 and Mus.D in 1872. On the 24 November 1875, at the Town Hall, Birmingham, the first part of his oratorio The Captivity was performed.

He was a regular conductor at the Birmingham Musical Union (1870–86), the Wolverhampton Festival (1883, 1886, succeeding William Stockley), the North Staffordshire Festival in Hanley (1888–99), and the Birmingham Festival Choral Society (1895). In 1884 he was appointed Examiner for Music Degrees at Cambridge University. He later taught at the Royal College of Music where his notable pupils included Rosina Buckman and Herbert Sanders.

Heap was the most important early patron of Edward Elgar, and through his connections with the North Staffordshire Festival, commissioned his cantata King Olaf, an important breakthrough in his career. Elgar later wrote that without Heap he would have "remained in outer darkness", and dedicated his Organ Sonata and the oratorio The Light of Life to him.

After Heap's death - unexpectedly, of pneumonia at his home, 22 Clarendon Road, Edgbaston - the composer Havergal Brian wrote to the secretary of the Royal Philharmonic Society, comparing Heap favourably to the better-known Frederic Cowen and Alexander Mackenzie: "What was the old Phil doing to miss such a genius? Cowen, Mackenzie and Co. weren't within a thousand miles of Heap – who died unknown outside the Midlands."

Heap's memorial was sculpted by Albert Toft, and is in Walsall Town Hall. His son was James Sebastian Heap (1879 – 1964), organ scholar at Exeter College, Oxford, organist at Llandovery College in Wales, Mossley Hill parish church in Liverpool, and music master, King Edward School in Bath.

A printed booklet of his testimonials relating to his job application to be the organist at Birmingham Town Hall in 1868 is kept at the University of Birmingham, Cadbury Research Library.

== Compositions ==
His works include chamber and orchestral music, sacred and secular choral settings, songs and organ music. His Piano Trio was performed in Leipzig in the 1860s. His Clarinet Sonata of 1879, written for Henry Lazarus, is one of the very earliest examples of the British clarinet sonata. It was first heard at the Clef Club in Birmingham. and revived and broadcast in the 1930s by the clarinetist S. C. Cotterell. Heap also composed a sonata for violin and piano, a quintet for piano and wind instruments, and two orchestral overtures, one played first at the Birmingham Festival of 1879, then repeated at Crystal Palace.

Choral works include his oratorio The Captivity, a motet Salvum fac Regem (performed at Leipzig), cantatas The Voice of Spring (1882, Liverpool) and The Maid of Astolat (1886, for the Wolverhampton Musical Festival). A dramatic cantata, Fair Rosamond, was composed for The North Staffordshire Musical Festival in October 1890. There were many other anthems, songs, and organ pieces.

== Appointments ==
- Organist of Queen's College, Birmingham (a predecessor college of the University of Birmingham) (1859–1862)
- Organist of St John's Church, Wolverhampton (1868–?)
- Conductor of the Birmingham Philharmonic Union (1870–1886)
- Conductor of the Wolverhampton Festival Choral Society (1881–1886)
- Conductor of the North Staffordshire Festival, Hanley (1888–1899)
- Conductor of the Birmingham Festival Choral Society (1895)
- Conductor of the Birmingham Triennial Music Festival (1897)
- Conductor of the Walsall Philharmonic Union.
