= Harold Gray (conductor) =

English conductor and musician

Harold Charles Gray OBE (1 December 1903 – 31 March 1991) was an English conductor, choirmaster, pianist and organist who served as Associate Conductor of the City of Birmingham Symphony Orchestra from 1932 until 1979. He was also the Principal Conductor of the Carl Rosa Opera Company from 1943 to 1946, Director of Music at Holy Trinity Church, Sutton Coldfield for 50 years until 1981, and conductor of the Birmingham Choral Union for 20 years until 1975.

== Life and career ==
Gray's association with the then City of Birmingham Orchestra started in 1924 when he was employed as secretary and musical amanuensis to Adrian Boult, who was newly appointed as the orchestra's Director and Conductor. Gray studied conducting under Malcolm Sargent at London's Royal College of Music and first conducted the CBO on 30 January 1930 in Sutton Coldfield in a performance with the Australian baritone Peter Dawson. He was encouraged to continue conducting by new CBO Director Leslie Heward and in November 1930 conducted a complete performance of Gounod's Faust for a broadcast by the BBC. From 1931 he conducted the orchestra's children's concerts and in June 1932 he was appointed Deputy Conductor.

Tensions developed between Gray and the CBO committee in 1940 after Gray organised a "New Midland Symphony Orchestra", using CBO and freelance players to perform away from Birmingham and broadcasting a number of performances for the BBC Midland Region. Gray enlisted in 1941 and served as Chief Music Advisor to Western Command. He didn't conduct any concerts for the CBO between 1943 and 1946, working instead as the Principal Conductor of the Carl Rosa Opera Company, but in September 1946 he returned to Birmingham and in 1947 was confirmed as Associate Conductor under George Weldon.

Gray's role included presiding over the popular summertime CBSO Proms and conducting hundreds of schools concerts and out-of-town performances. He only conducted the orchestra in London once, at the Royal Festival Hall In October 1959. Gray was particularly noted for his ability to deputise for guest conductors if they suddenly became unavailable: Thomas Beecham later recalled "If I needed a conductor at short notice I'd get hold of Harold Gray. He'd know the work and get on without any fuss". In 1956 Gray deputised for Beecham - who was taken sick the day before a performance - by learning Liszt's Faust Symphony overnight, studying the score until 4am and conducting it the next day. The resulting performance was considered an "outstanding success". In the opening concert of the 1974 season he was able to conduct successful performances of Beethoven's Violin Concerto with Kyung Wha Chung and Brahms' First Symphony, broadcast live on the BBC, when both Adrian Boult and Louis Fremaux were taken sick on the same day . In 1962 he acted as the orchestra's General Manager on a temporary basis after the sudden death of the previous office-holder.

In 1974 Gray was made an OBE in the Queen's Birthday Honours list. He retired from his Associate Conductor post in July 1979, and was given the honorary lifetime title Conductor Emeritus, conducting his last CBSO concert in March 1982. He died on Easter Day 1991, a fortnight before the opening of Birmingham's Symphony Hall, and the CBSO's final concert in Birmingham Town Hall ended with Delius' Walk to the Paradise Garden, conducted in tribute to Gray by Simon Rattle.

== Musical reputation ==
Gray was closely associated in Birmingham with the music of William Alwyn, Ernest Bloch and Peter Maxwell Davies; he introduced substantial new works by Frank Martin, Darius Milhaud, William Mathias and Alan Rawsthorne into the Birmingham repertoire; and in 1959 conducted Zoltán Kodály's Budavári Te Deum in the presence of the composer. He was particularly associated with the music of Carl Nielsen, and was the first British conductor to perform all six Nielsen symphonies in concert.

== Bibliography ==
- Bratby, Richard (2019), Forward - 100 years of the City of Birmingham Symphony Orchestra, London: Elliott & Thompson, ISBN 9781783964536
- King-Smith, Beresford (1995), Crescendo! 75 years of the City of Birmingham Symphony Orchestra, London: Methuen, ISBN 0413697401
