= Mike Seal =

Mike Seal may refer to:

- Michael Seal (born 1970), British orchestral conductor and classical violinist
- Mike Seal (fighter) (born 1977), Mexican mixed martial artist
