= CBSO Youth Orchestra =

UK youth orchestra

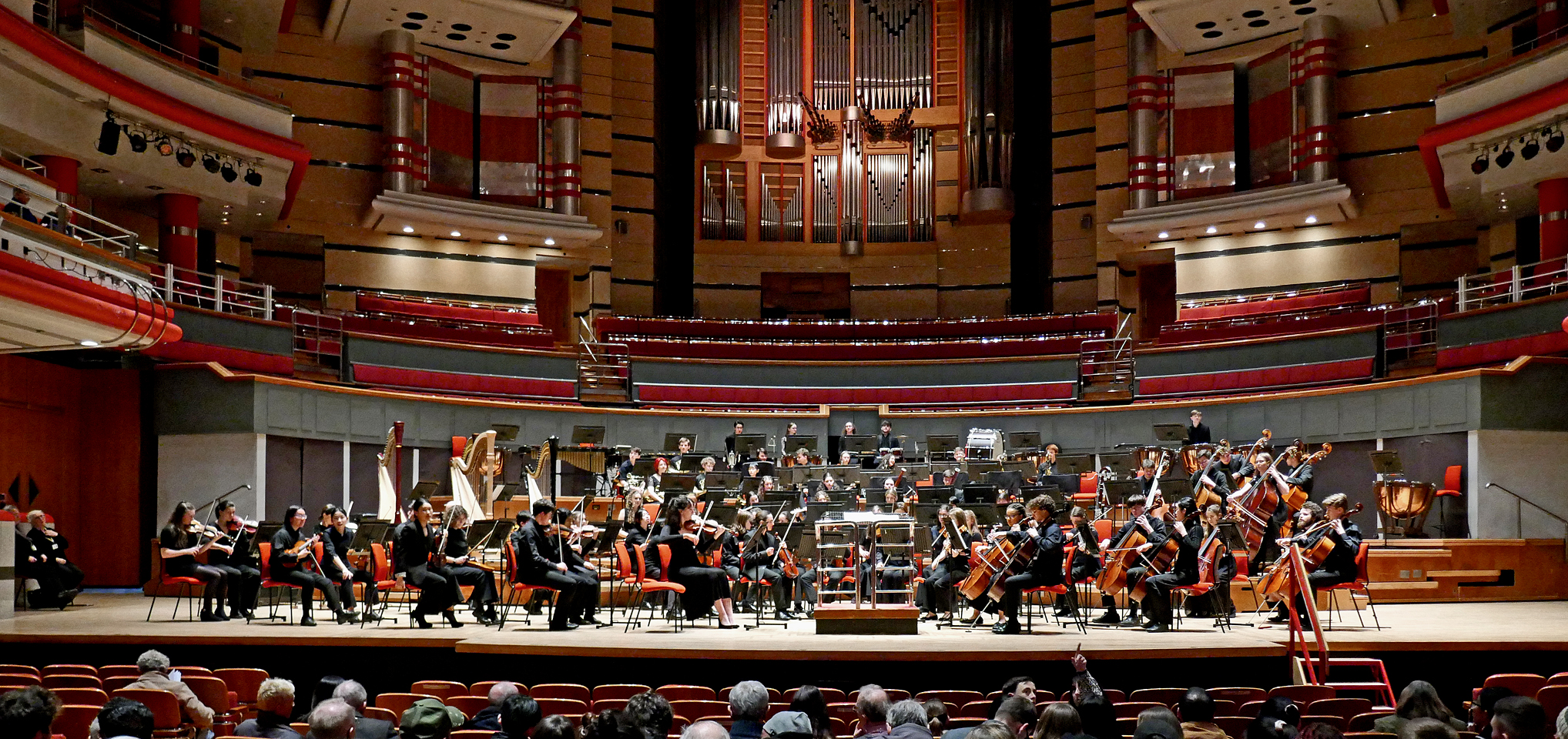

The CBSO Youth Orchestra in Birmingham, England, is a youth orchestra for young people aged between 13 and 26 years old, managed by the City of Birmingham Symphony Orchestra (CBSO). The orchestra is based at CBSO Centre but performs at Symphony Hall, Birmingham, and at the Birmingham Town Hall, amongst other venues. Membership is drawn from the entire Midlands region.

== History ==
The orchestra was founded in October 2004 as the successor to the Midland Youth Orchestra, an independent youth orchestra established by the then CBSO general manager Blyth Major and which operated from 1956 until being wound up in response to falling membership in summer 2004. The orchestra recruits young orchestral musicians in the 13-26 age range and performs concerts annually under the direction of the CBSO's Music Director or one of the CBSO's regular guest conductors. These have included Kazuki Yamada, Andris Nelsons, Edward Gardner, Sakari Oramo, Andrew Litton, Jac van Steen, Paul Daniel, Martyn Brabbins, Thomas Sondergard, Alan Buribayev, Alexander Vedernikov and Mike Seal. Soloists have included Alison Balsom, Alina Pogostkina, Jean-Efflam Bavouzet, Christine Rice, Katarina Karnéus, Guy Johnston, Leon McCawley, Chloë Hanslip, Martin Roscoe, Tasmin Little, Peter Donohoe, and Lore Lixenberg.

In line with CBSO programming policy, the Youth Orchestra has a policy of performing music that is outside of the standard repertoire, and often more ambitious than that usually associated with youth orchestras. This has included Richard Strauss's Alpine Symphony, Shostakovich's Eleventh Symphony, John Foulds' Le Cabaret, Mahler's Fifth and Seventh Symphony, Julian Anderson's Alhambra Fantasy, Ligeti's Concert Romanesc, Korngold's Violin Concerto, Stravinsky's Pulcinella and Rite of Spring, Alban Berg's Seven Early Songs, and Jörg Widmann's Con brio. In February 2007 it gave the world premiere of Streamlines by Tansy Davies, a work commissioned by the Feeney Trust specifically for the CBSO Youth Orchestra. Subsequent commissions have included Più Mosso by Luke Bedford (premiered October 2009) and Leckey by Ben Foskett (premiered October 2011). A new work by Charlotte Bray was performed by the CBSO Youth Orchestra in the 2013–2014 season, and they also gave Mark-Anthony Turnage's Passchendaele its UK premiere in November 2014. Most recently, the orchestra gave the world premiere of Egress by Christopher Churcher, in July 2025.

In September 2007 the CBSO Youth Orchestra launched a subsidiary chamber orchestra, the CBSO Youth Orchestra Academy, which performed annually under Mike Seal at Birmingham Town Hall.

Former members of the CBSO Youth Orchestra include David Taylor, Ben Gernon, Jamie Phillips and Laura Mvula.

== CBSO Youth Chorus ==
The CBSO Youth Chorus, based in Birmingham, England is a youth choir which performs alone, or in association with the CBSO. The CBSO Youth Chorus was formed in 1994 with the aim of providing the CBSO with a chorus for the many pieces of symphonic music that require young people's voices. Open to girls in school years 9 to 13, it is now established as one of the country's leading youth choruses, performing independently as well as with the CBSO and many other prestigious orchestras and choirs. The choir is based at the CBSO Centre. The choir toured Sweden in May 2007, performing in two concerts in the Gothenburg Concert Hall. The Chorus Director is Simon Halsey and the conductor is Julian Wilkins.

== CBSO Young Voices ==
The CBSO Young Voices was a choir for young people, based in Birmingham, England. It was one of the members of the family of CBSO Choruses. Formed in 1999 as a partnership between the CBSO and Birmingham Music Service, Young Voices was based at the CBSO Centre, just off Broad Street. The chorus performed in many venues, including Westminster Abbey, Symphony Hall, The Wales Millennium Centre, and Buckingham Palace. The choir was disbanded in the mid-2010s.

== See also ==
- City of Birmingham Symphony Chorus
- City of Birmingham Symphony Orchestra
