= New Birmingham Orchestra =

Professional symphony orchestra based in Birmingham, England between 1917 and 1919

Thomas Beecham

The New Birmingham Orchestra, sometimes called simply the Birmingham Orchestra, was a professional symphony orchestra established by Thomas Beecham and based in Birmingham, England between 1917 and 1919. Although it was short-lived, it was succeeded the year after its dissolution by what is now the City of Birmingham Symphony Orchestra, which was run in its early days by many of the same individuals.

== History ==
=== Foundation ===
The New Birmingham Orchestra owed its foundation to three influential Birmingham citizens who believed that the city needed an official, publicly funded professional symphony orchestra to replace the competing orchestral enterprises that had dominated the city's music since the demise of George Halford's Orchestra in 1907. Granville Bantock had succeeded Edward Elgar as Peyton Professor of Music at the University of Birmingham and had been involved in promoting orchestral concerts in the city since 1907. Ernest Newman was the music critic of the Birmingham Post and had written as early as 1913 that the system of financial guarantees from wealthy backers that had sustained Birmingham's orchestras through the 19th century had become discredited. Neville Chamberlain was Lord Mayor of Birmingham from 1916 to 1918. A genuine music-lover, he wrote "I shall be really pleased if I can get something done for music, because it is the one thing I always had in mind to attempt if I ever did become Lord Mayor". Chamberlain believed that a new orchestra could be funded with a combination of an endowment fund and a contribution from the municipal rates – a revolutionary idea for a British politician – but that such a plan would be unlikely to be successful until the end of the war.

Chamberlain, Bantock and Newman set themselves up as the "Midland Concert Promotors' Association" to develop plans for an orchestra, and set up a working party to investigate details of such a scheme. At this time Thomas Beecham was the most powerful figure in British music and all three all agreed he would be the best person to direct a new orchestra. On 26 September 1916 a meeting was held to which Beecham was invited, later claiming that "All the trite sentiments ever uttered upon such a subject anywhere since life began were rolled out by one speaker after another .... but of any idea how to put it into practical operation there was little evidence". Although Chamberlain felt that the establishment of a high quality orchestra would need a financial contribution from the city that wouldn't be possible until after the war, Beecham disagreed and offered to set up an orchestra himself.

Beecham invited the leaders of every choral society in the local area to a meeting, where they agreed to use his planned orchestra to support their concerts as long as the expense was no greater than engaging freelance musicians. On 2 March 1917 Beecham formally offered to provide the Midlands Concert Promotors' Association with a permanent local orchestra for an initial period of three years and as no municipal scheme was likely while the war continued he was asked to proceed.

=== Performances and dissolution ===
Beecham did not have time to recruit or train the orchestra so delegated the task to Eugene Goossens. Wartime conscription had reduced the pool of high-quality players available in the Birmingham area, so some positions remained unfilled and had to be occupied for concerts by players from London. The orchestra scheduled nine Symphony concerts on Wednesday evenings – three each to be conducted by Beecham, Henry Wood and Landon Ronald – together with 10 concerts of popular classics on Sunday evenings. The symphony concerts had adventurous programmes including works by Frederick Delius, Igor Stravinsky, Nikolai Rimsky-Korsakov and Édouard Lalo, and performances by prestigious soloists including Benno Moiseiwitsch, Arthur De Greef and Albert Sammons. Nearly 60 other concerts for promoters throughout the Midlands were also performed by the orchestra in its first year.

Beecham conducted the first concert on 10 October 1917, to enthusiastic reviews from Ernest Newman in the Birmingham Post but with a worryingly large number of empty seats. The orchestra's second concert under Henry Wood two weeks later was felt by Newman to "not have the electric quality" of the earlier one. With Beecham conducting only three of the nine concerts himself he was not able to develop a personally loyal audience.

Beecham later recalled that he not made "more than a reasonable loss" on the first season and was expecting financial support from Lady Cunard to help the enterprise continue. A second season of concerts took place in 1918–1919, but had to be moved to the Central Hall in Corporation Street after the Town Hall was requisitioned by the government for wartime purposes. Although audiences in the new venue were very healthy, the orchestra couldn't continue without a financial contribution from Beecham, who at this point was insolvent after a disastrous involvement in a property deal in Covent Garden in London. With the orchestra's predicament compounded by the loss of its primary performance venue the city refused to intervene to save it and the orchestra was abruptly dissolved.

Despite the demise of Beecham's orchestra, in March 1919 Bantock submitted a new proposal to Birmingham City Council for the establishment of what became the City of Birmingham Symphony Orchestra.

== Bibliography ==
- Handford, Margaret (2006). Sounds Unlikely: Music in Birmingham. Studley: Brewin Books. ISBN 1858582873.
- King-Smith, Beresford (1995). Crescendo! 75 years of the City of Birmingham Symphony Orchestra. London: Methuen. ISBN 0413697401.
- Lucas, John (2008). Thomas Beecham: An Obsession with Music. Woodbridge: Boydell & Brewer. ISBN 978-1843834021.
