= Appleby Matthews =

English conductor and organist (1884–1949)

Appleby Matthews

Thomas Appleby Matthews (30 August 1884 – 22 June 1949) was an English conductor and organist.

== Life and career ==
Matthews was born in Tamworth, Staffordshire and received his musical education at the Birmingham and Midland Institute School of Music, serving as organist of St. Philip's Cathedral, Birmingham and playing viola in George Halford's Orchestra. He became an experienced choirmaster, running his own Appleby Matthews Chorus, and also conducted the Birmingham City Police band.

Leon Goossens, who played the oboe under Matthews for the City of Birmingham Orchestra, described him as "a very short man [who] always tried to walk a little bit taller than he really was".

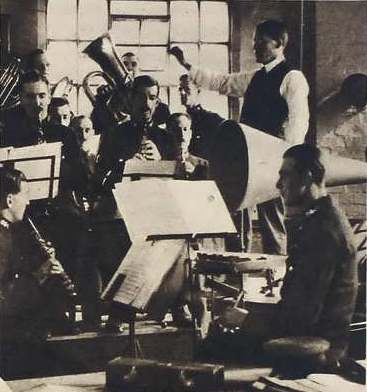
Matthews conducting a Birmingham Police Band recording session in 1921

=== Appleby Matthews Orchestra ===
Between 1916 and 1920 Matthews ran annual series of concerts in Birmingham with an orchestra bearing his own name. The first recorded concert took place on 16 July 1916 at Birmingham Town Hall, with 40 musicians and Alex Cohen as leader. The 1917-1918 season saw twelve Monday evening concerts take place at the Birmingham Repertory Theatre in Station Street; the 1918-1919 season saw 40 Sunday evening concerts at the Scala on Smallbrook Street; and the 1919-1920 season saw 36 concerts, also on Sunday evenings, at the Futurist Cinema on John Bright Street.

The orchestra's most significant concert took place on 4 October 1917, when Matthews, his orchestra, chorus and a soprano soloist gave the first complete performance of Edward Elgar's choral trilogy The Spirit of England. The first concert of Matthews' final season on 7 September 1919 was reviewed in the Musical Times: Alex Cohen was still leading the orchestra, who played a programme featuring works by Mozart, Wagner and Dvorak, and the review recorded a "packed house" and "fine performances", concluding "evidently these excellent concerts have come to stay".

=== City of Birmingham Orchestra ===
In 1920 Matthews became the first conductor of the City of Birmingham Orchestra, today's City of Birmingham Symphony Orchestra. Grove's Dictionary of Music and Musicians says of this period:

In 1920 the City of Birmingham Orchestra (CBO) came into existence. 40 of its 75 players came from an orchestra recently established by T. Appleby Matthews, which had already played 40 Sunday evening concerts in each of two seasons from 1918 to 1920 at the Scala Theatre and the new Futurist Cinema. The orchestra thus launched was the country’s first municipally funded symphony orchestra, its initial civic grant £1250. Matthews was its first conductor. His laudable ambitions outran the budget; he was replaced in 1924 by Adrian Boult.

=== Other activities ===
Matthews supported Rutland Boughton at his Glastonbury Festivals (1914–1925) and conducted performances of The Immortal Hour and Bethlehem. He also acted as a chorus master for the Beecham Opera Company.

Appearances by Matthews as a guest conductor included performances with the Hallé Orchestra in Manchester in 1916; with the Berlin Philharmonic in April 1922, where his programme was adventurous and well-reviewed; and with the Orchestre Lamoureux in Paris on 31 October 1922, where he conducted the Paris premiere of Beni Mora, the first performance of any work of Gustav Holst given in that capital.

Matthews died in Birmingham on 22 June 1949.

== Bibliography ==
- Greene, Richard. Holst: The Planets. Cambridge: Cambridge University Press, 1995. ISBN 0-521-45633-9
- Handford, Margaret. Sounds Unlikely: Music in Birmingham. Studley: Brewin Books, 2006. ISBN 1858582873
- Hinrichsen, Max. Hinrichsen's Musical Year Book, 1947–1948. London: Hinrichsen Edition Limited, 1947.
- King-Smith, Beresford. Crescendo! 75 years of the City of Birmingham Symphony Orchestra. London: Methuen, 1995. ISBN 0413697401
- Short, Michael. Gustav Holst: The Man and his Music. Oxford: Oxford University Press, 1990. ISBN 0-19-314154-X
- (organization), Jstor (1948). "Appleby Matthews". The Musical Times. 89. Novello: 291.
