= Harold Gray (disambiguation) =

Harold Gray (1894–1968) was an American cartoonist.

Harold Gray may also refer to:

- Harold E. Gray (1906–1972), American pilot and executive for Pan Am
- Harold Gray (landowner) (1867–1951), Anglo-Irish landowner, horse breeder and politician
- Harold St George Gray (1872–1963), British archaeologist
- Harold Gray (conductor) (1903–1991), British orchestral conductor
- Harold Gray (American football) (1938–1990), American football player and coach

== See also ==
- Harold Grey (born 1971), boxer
