= George Halford =

George Halford may refer to:

- George Halford (bishop) (1865–1948), Anglican bishop of Rockhampton
- George Halford (musician) (1858–1933), English pianist, organist, composer and conductor
- George Halford (rugby union) (1886–1960), English rugby union player
- George Britton Halford (1824–1910), English-born anatomist and physiologist in Australia
