= Frémaux =

Frémaux is a surname, derived from Germanic 'fram-wald'. Notable people with the surname include:

- Eugene Wilton Frémaux (1887–1969), American businessman
- Louis Frémaux (1921–2017), French conductor
- Thierry Frémaux (born 1960), French film critic
