= CBSC =

CBSC may refer to:

- Canadian Broadcast Standards Council, a Canadian non-governmental organization
- City of Birmingham Symphony Chorus, a chorus based in Birmingham, England
- Comparator-Based Switched Capacitor, a type of circuit in electronics
- Cowboy Bebop: Space Cowboy, a popular online game
