= George Halford (musician) =

George John Halford (13 February 1858 – 11 February 1933) was an English pianist, organist, composer and conductor.

== Life and career ==
Born in Chilvers Coton, Warwickshire, Halford was the son of a violinist, and when young sang in a local choir and played brass in a local orchestra. He studied the organ under William Chater at nearby Holy Trinity Church, Coventry, and in 1875 moved to Birmingham, where he studied piano and composition under Charles Swinnerton Heap and was successively the organist at St John's Church, Wolverhampton from 1881, St Michael's Church, Handsworth from 1886 and St Mary's Church, Handsworth from 1891. He graduated in 1892 as a Bachelor of Music from the University of Durham and a fellow of the Royal College of Organists. From then until 1927 taught piano and musical theory at the Birmingham and Midland Institute School of Music.

Halford made his public concert debut at Birmingham Town Hall in 1884, performing Ferdinand Hiller's 2nd Piano Concerto, conducted by Heap. In 1886, he was made conductor of the Birmingham Choral and Orchestral Association and in 1892 conductor of the orchestra of the Birmingham and Midland Institute School of Music. By 1897 he had a great deal of experience conducting amateur choirs and orchestras around Birmingham, and had travelled to Europe to study conducting.

In 1897, backed by a syndicate of 54 leading local citizens, he established George Halford's Orchestra, which performed annual series of fortnightly concerts at Birmingham Town Hall for the next ten years. Halford's ambitions were to establish a permanent orchestra of a quality to rival any in the country, made up primarily of local musicians. Performing a wide range of challenging repertoire, the orchestra attracted attention from well outside Birmingham, including from major musical figures such as Richard Strauss and Sergei Rachmaninov, and marked a major step in the development that would eventually lead to the establishment of the City of Birmingham Symphony Orchestra. In 1906 Halford's players reformed themselves into the self-governing Birmingham Symphony Orchestra, with Halford remaining as music director but only conducting half of the concerts.

As a guest conductor he performed with orchestras including the London Symphony Orchestra at the Royal Albert Hall and the Bournemouth Symphony Orchestra. He served as a member of the management committee of the City of Birmingham Orchestra (now the City of Birmingham Symphony Orchestra) after its foundation in 1920.

Halford was a prolific composer of orchestral, chamber and vocal music, much of which was published by Alfred Novello. His church music included anthems such as Remember not, Lord, our offences (1886) and The Souls of the Righteous (1915); a cantata The Paraclete (1891) and a Te Deum in D major. His overture In Memoriam was performed at The Proms at the Queen's Hall in London on 11 October 1906. Recalling the concert in 1938 the conductor Henry Wood pronounced the work "excellent" and concluded "Birmingham has always taken pride in its music, and when the full history of its activities comes to be written the name of George Halford should not be overlooked. Birmingham owes him a great deal".

He retired in to Cleeve Prior in Oxfordshire and died in Kidlington in 1933.

== Bibliography ==
- Handford, Margaret (2006). Sounds Unlikely: Music in Birmingham. Studley: Brewin Books. ISBN 1858582873.
- Harlow, Martin (1999). "Mr Halford's Orchestral Concerts 1897-1907. Conductor at Large". The Musical Times. 140 (1867). Musical Times Publications Ltd.: 49–53. doi:10.2307/1193895. JSTOR 1193895.
- King-Smith, Beresford (1995). Crescendo! 75 years of the City of Birmingham Symphony Orchestra. London: Methuen. ISBN 0413697401.
