= The Spirit of England =

Cover of first edition of published score

The Spirit of England, Op. 80, is a work for chorus, orchestra, and soprano/tenor soloist in three movements composed by Edward Elgar between 1915 and 1917, setting text from Laurence Binyon's 1914 anthology of poems The Winnowing Fan. The work acts as a requiem for the dead of World War I and is dedicated "to the memory of our glorious men, with a special thought for the Worcesters".

== History ==
The first of Binyon's poems used by Elgar was published within a week of Britain's entry into World War I. Its title, "The Fourth of August", marks the date of the declaration of war on Germany. The second, "To Women", and the third, "For the Fallen", were written before the end of 1914, after British troops had suffered the first of many great losses during the conflict.

Elgar conducted the second and third sections in Leeds in 1916. The complete work was first performed in Birmingham on 4 October 1917, by the soprano Rosina Buckman, with Appleby Matthews conducting his choir and the New Beecham Orchestra.

An abridged version of "For the Fallen", called "With Proud Thanksgiving", was sung at the unveiling of the new Cenotaph in Whitehall on 11 November 1920.

== Movements ==
There are three movements:

1. "The Fourth of August" – Moderato e maestoso – G major
2. "To Women" – Moderato – A♭ major
3. "For the Fallen" – Solenne – A minor

== Reception ==
The anonymous contemporary reviewer in The Times wrote that Elgar's new work "contains some of his most vigorous and inspiring, if not some of his most inspired, work." Looking at the work from the perspective of the 1980s, Edward Greenfield wrote of its "magnificently defying the dangers of wartime bombast". In a 2007 study of Elgar, Rachel Cowgill noted that scholars including Jerrold Northrop Moore and Donald Mitchell class The Spirit of England as one Elgar's "imperialist works". Cowgill comments that musically Elgar seems to respond in such a vein, "with expansive, aspirational melodies built around upward leaps and rising sequences in full choir and orchestra, marked grandioso, nobilmente, and sonoramente." But in her view an earlier writer, Basil Maine, correctly distinguishes between the tone of The Spirit of England and that of other imperialist Elgar works: "The conception is grandiose, but not as the Pomp and Circumstance Marches are. It moves along with no less splendour, but with a more austere deliberation."
