= George Weldon =

English conductor (1908–1963)

George Anthony Thomas Weldon (5 June 1908 – 17 August 1963) was an English conductor.

== Biography ==
Born in Chichester, Sussex, Weldon was the son of Major F H Weldon of the Sherwood Foresters. He was educated at Sherborne School and the Royal College of Music. He studied conducting with Malcolm Sargent and Aylmer Buesst. Weldon gained experience conducting regional orchestras in Newbury, Tunbridge Wells and Hastings.

In 1943, at 36 years of age, he became the conductor of the City of Birmingham Orchestra in succession to Leslie Heward. He was dismissed in 1950, following unsubstantiated rumours that he was having an affair with Ruth Gipps, choirmaster of the Birmingham orchestra's chorus. It was announced that Weldon would be replaced by Rudolf Schwarz; according to Gipps, Weldon resigned before he could be dismissed.

In 1952 Weldon became assistant to Sir John Barbirolli at the Hallé Orchestra and remained in that position until his death. Supporting Barbirolli he conducted many of the more challenging new works introduced at the Cheltenham Music Festival. In 1955 and 1956 he also conducted the Sadler's Wells Ballet. While in Manchester, Weldon took charge of the Hallé summer seasons of promenade concerts, and many industrial concerts around the north of England. He frequently conducted in London and abroad, made broadcasts and - with the support of Walter Legge - many records.

== Personal life and death ==
Weldon became well known for his love of sports cars and was an Aston Martin owner and enthusiast. In 1961 was one of the first buyers of a Jaguar E-Type. His Birmingham address was 41 Portland Road, Edgbaston. From the 1950s he occupied the first floor flat at 37 St. John’s Wood Road in London. Suffering from increasing ill-health (asthma and angina), Weldon nevertheless embarked on a conducting tour of South Africa in the Summer of 1963. He was found dead in his bed on the morning of 17 August at the West Country Hotel, Cape Town. The Cape Argus for Monday August 19th stated that the cause of his death ‘was officially established as heart failure’.

== Recordings ==
Weldon made a series of recordings for the Columbia, EMI and Pye record labels. His stereophonic recording of Tchaikovsky's The Sleeping Beauty with the Philharmonia Orchestra has been reissued on CD. Elgar was one of his favourite composers, and there are several recordings of him conducting Elgar, including Sea Pictures with Gladys Ripley and the Philharmonia Orchestra at the Royal Festival Hall in June 1957. Numerous other recordings by Weldon are also available.
