= Birmingham Symphony Orchestra =

Early 20th century orchestra in Birmingham, England

The Birmingham Symphony Orchestra was a professional symphony orchestra based in Birmingham, England between 1906 and 1918.

The orchestra was founded as a self-governing organisation run on cooperative lines by musicians from George Halford's Orchestra, which had been performing annual series of concerts in Birmingham since 1897. George Halford remained the new orchestra's Music Director, though he would only conduct half of their concerts. The new body included fifty of the musicians from the previous organisation.

The inaugural concert took place in Birmingham Town Hall on 4 April 1906 and was conducted by Henry Wood, with further concerts in the 1906-1907 season being conducted by Halford, Hans Richter and Landon Ronald, and the Musical Times describing as a "splendid concert" a performance conducted by Halford in March 1907. For the 1907-1908 and 1908-1909 seasons concerts by the BSO were promoted under the auspices of the "Birmingham Concerts Society" and took place on Tuesday evenings, conducted by Halford, Frederick Cowen, Charles Stanford, Allen Gill and Henri Verbrugghen. From July 1910 it was the "Birmingham Philharmonic Society" that promoted eight concerts a year featuring the BSO players and conductors including Halford, Wood, Ronald, George Henschel, Vasily Safonov, Thomas Beecham and Fritz Cassirer.

The orchestra also gave popular Saturday night concerts at the Town Hall that continued until 1918, and performed widely alongside many different choral societies with conductors including Edward Elgar, Henry Coward and George Robertson Sinclair.

Although there was no institutional connection between the Birmingham Symphony Orchestra and the later City of Birmingham Symphony Orchestra, fifteen of the players who founded the earlier organisation in 1906 would also play with the later orchestra when it was established in 1920.

== Bibliography ==
- Handford, Margaret (2006). Sounds Unlikely: Music in Birmingham. Studley: Brewin Books. ISBN 1858582873.
- Harlow, Martin (1999). "Mr Halford's Orchestral Concerts 1897-1907. Conductor at Large". The Musical Times. 140 (1867). Musical Times Publications Ltd.: 49–53. doi:10.2307/1193895. JSTOR 1193895.
- King-Smith, Beresford (1995). Crescendo! 75 years of the City of Birmingham Symphony Orchestra. London: Methuen. ISBN 0413697401.
