= Ben Foskett =

British composer

Ben Foskett (born 1977) is a London and Paris-based British composer. His commissions have included Leckey for the CBSO Youth Orchestra and works for London Children's Ballet.

== Selected works ==
- Violin Concerto (2004)
- Trying to see more 2004
- From Trumpet world premiere at the BBC Proms

Recordings

- Ben Foskett - Dinosaur Five Night Pieces (for piano), Hornet II (for clarinet and orchestra), From Trumpet, On From Four, Dinosaur (for flute), Cinq Chansons à Hurle-Vent (saxophone and soprano). NMC Recordings Debut Series, June 2014
