= CBSO Centre =

Concert hall in Birmingham, England

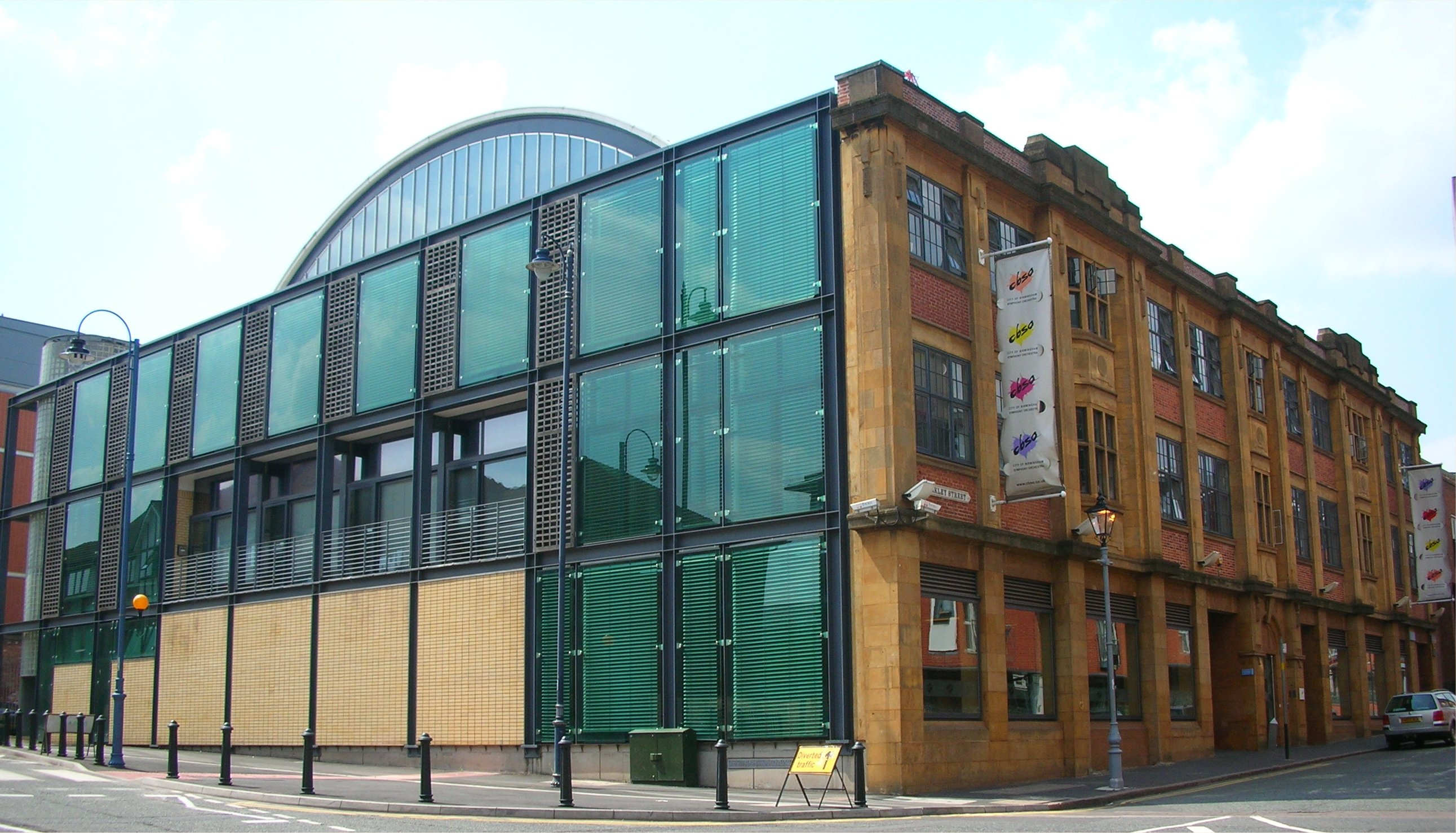
- view of CBSO Centre from Holliday Street
- Interactive map of CBSO Centre
- Address: CBSO Centre, Berkley Street. Birmingham, B1 2LF
- Location: Berkley Street, Birmingham, United Kingdom
- Coordinates: 52.4756°N 1.9094°W
- Current use: Live music venue, rehearsal space

Construction
- Opened: 1997

Website
- https://cbso.co.uk/your-visit/cbso-centre

The CBSO Centre is the administrative home and rehearsal centre of the City of Birmingham Symphony Orchestra and the City of Birmingham Symphony Orchestra Choruses (CBSO Chorus, CBSO Youth Chorus and CBSO Young Voices). It also hosts rehearsals for Birmingham Contemporary Music Group and Ex Cathedra, and is situated on the corner of Berkley Street and Holliday Street, in Central Birmingham, England.

It contains a 300-seat auditorium which is also used for public performances and as a hired space for receptions and exhibitions.

Built in 1997 by Associated Architects it retains a façade of Rowe's Lead Works on Berkeley Street by H. Peter Hing (1921–22).

== See also ==
- List of concert halls
