= City of Birmingham Symphony Orchestra =

Orchestra based in Birmingham, England

- Orchestra
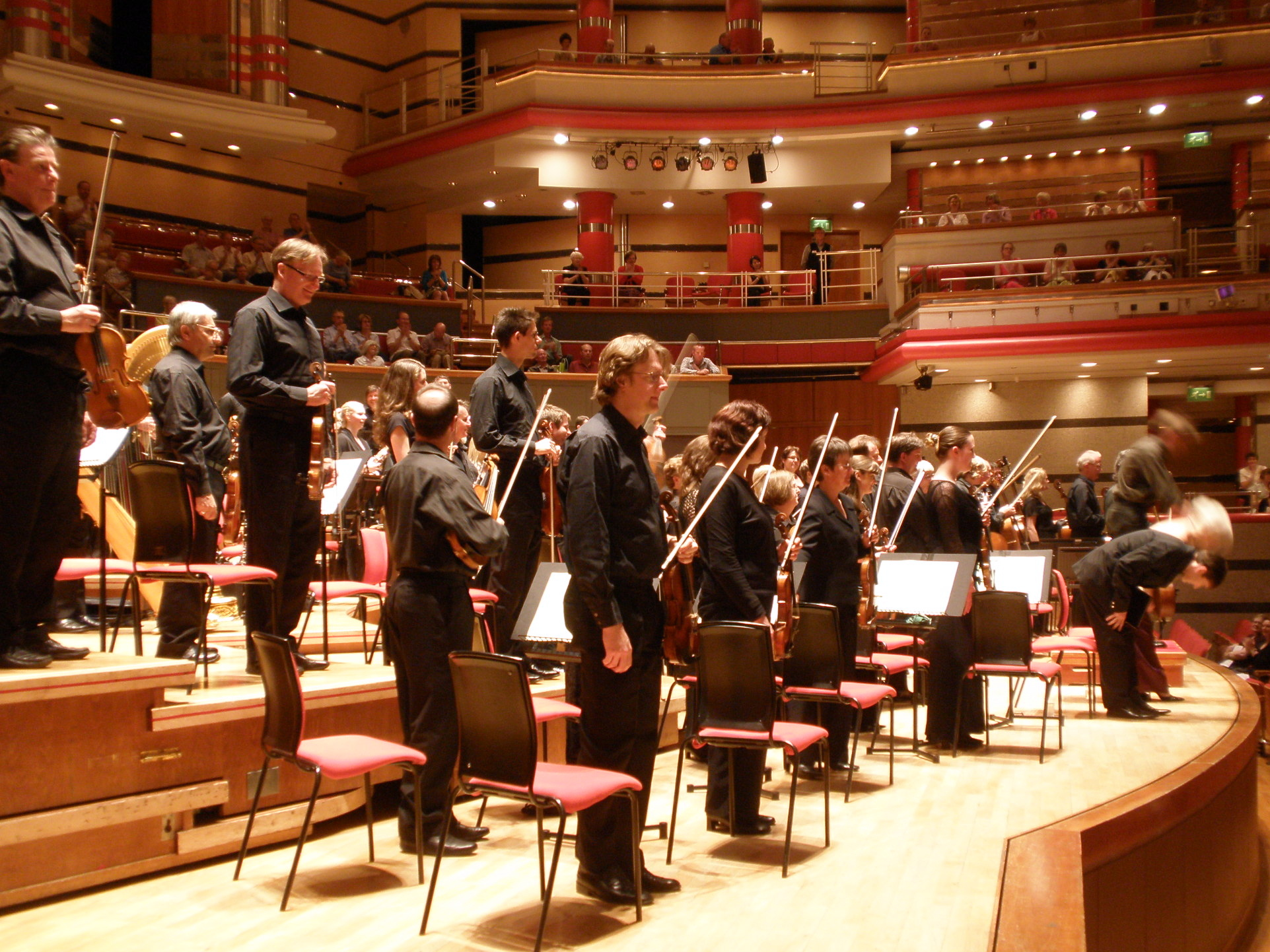
- The City of Birmingham Symphony Orchestra at Symphony Hall, Birmingham
- Short name: CBSO
- Former name: City of Birmingham Orchestra
- Founded: 1920
- Concert hall: Symphony Hall, Birmingham
- Music director: Kazuki Yamada
- Website: cbso.co.uk

The City of Birmingham Symphony Orchestra (CBSO) is a British orchestra based in Birmingham, England. It is the resident orchestra at Symphony Hall, Birmingham in Birmingham, which has been its principal performance venue since 1991. Its administrative and rehearsal base is at the nearby CBSO Centre, where it also presents chamber concerts by members of the orchestra and guest performers.

Each year, the CBSO performs more than 150 concerts in Birmingham, the UK and around the world. The CBSO has four choirs – the CBSO Chorus, Youth Chorus, Children's Chorus and SO Vocal (its un-auditioned community choir). The CBSO Choruses are directed by Simon Halsey, Chorus Director, who celebrated his 40-year anniversary with the CBSO in the 2023 season. The Children's and Youth Chorus are led by Julian Wilkins, Associate Chorus Director. SO Vocal is conducted by Lucy Hollins.

The current music director of the CBSO is Kazuki Yamada, who became chief conductor and artistic adviser in April 2023, and music director in May 2024.

== History ==
=== Background and foundation ===
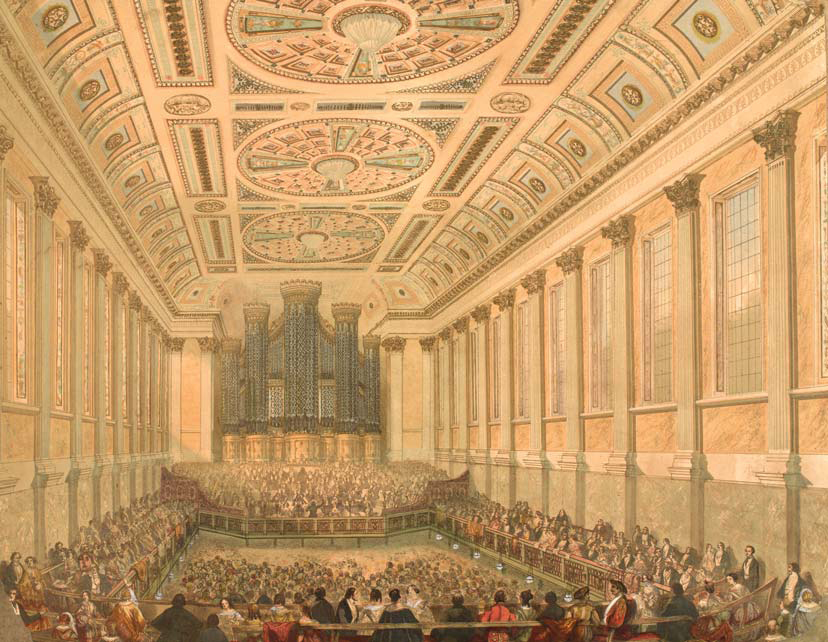
The Birmingham Festival Orchestra performing at Birmingham Town Hall in 1845

The earliest orchestral concerts known to have taken place in Birmingham were those organized by Barnabas Gunn at the Moor Street Theatre in 1740, and more than 20 separate orchestras are recorded as having existed in the city between that date and the foundation of what is now the CBSO in 1920. These orchestras often owed their origins to Birmingham's internationally significant tradition of choral music, that give birth to works such as Mendelsohn's Elijah and Elgar's Dream of Gerontius, and in 1834 saw the building Birmingham Town Hall, one of Europe's earliest large-scale concert halls. Birmingham's most notable early orchestra was the Birmingham Festival Orchestra, which formed as a group of 25 musicians in 1768 but by 1834 had grown into an orchestra of 147. Under Michael Costa and Hans Richter between 1849 and 1909 it included some of the leading instrumentalists of its day from across Britain and Europe, but remained an ad hoc grouping that assembled to play only at the three-yearly festivals. The town's first permanently established orchestra of locally based professional musicians was William Stockley's Orchestra, which was founded in 1856 and held annual concert seasons between 1873 and 1897. This was eclipsed as the city's leading orchestra at the end of the 19th century by George Halford's Orchestra, which put on similar series of concerts between 1897 and 1909.

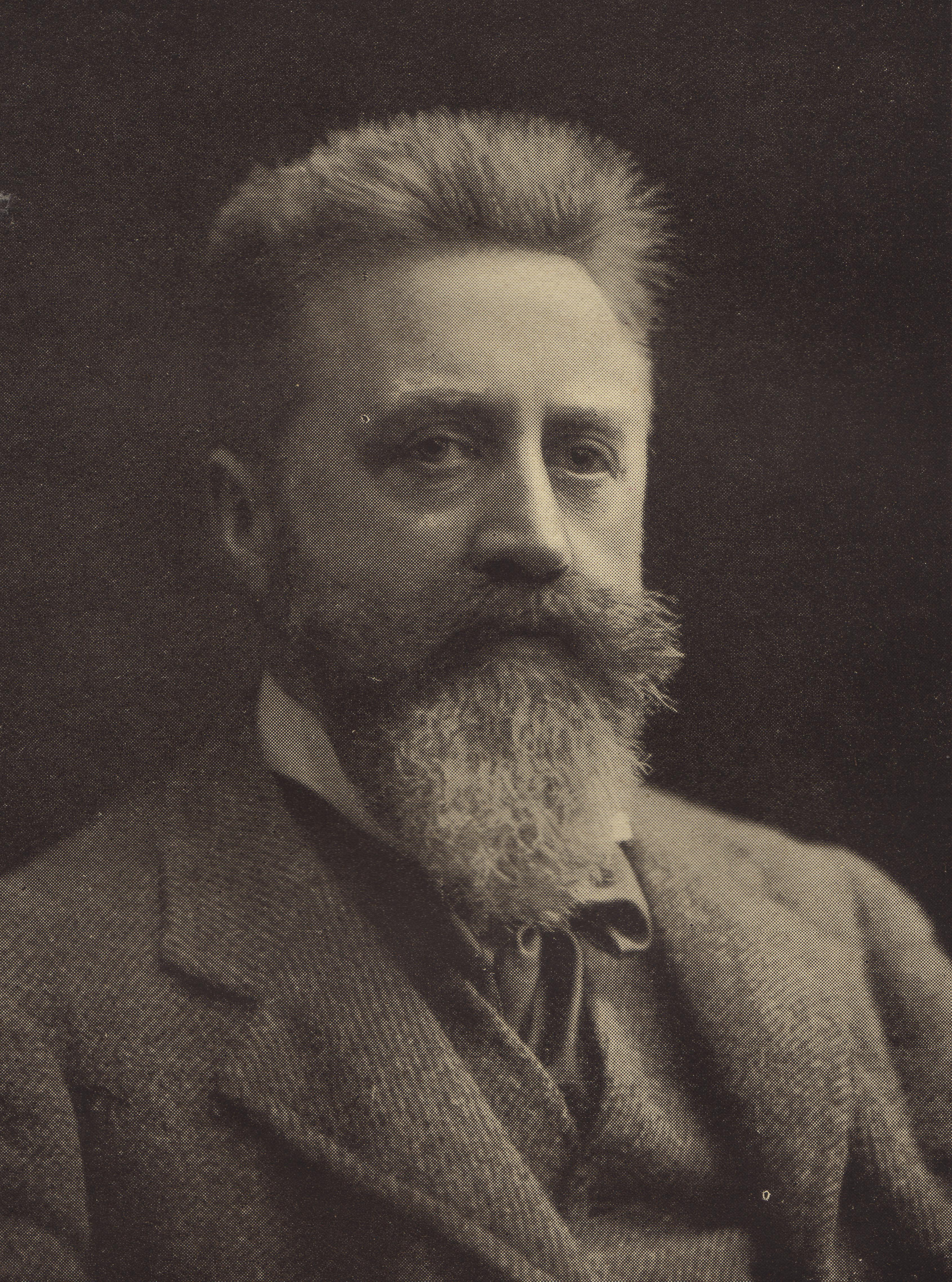
Granville Bantock, whose 1919 proposal led to the foundation of the City of Birmingham Orchestra in 1920.

Stockley and Halford established regular orchestral concerts as an expected feature of life in Birmingham which by the late 19th century supported a substantial pool of high quality locally based professional musicians. Between 1905 and 1920 this demand was met by a number of competing enterprises. Halford's players reformed in 1906 as the self-governing Birmingham Symphony Orchestra, which continued to perform until 1918 under notable conductors including Henry Wood, Hans Richter and Halford himself. Landon Ronald presented an annual season of promenade concerts at the Theatre Royal in New Street from 1905 to 1914 with a 70-strong orchestra made up largely of Birmingham-based musicians. Appleby Matthews and Richard Wassell both ran separate orchestras in their own names presenting annual series of concerts between 1916 and 1920; and Thomas Beecham conducted and promoted his own New Birmingham Orchestra between 1917 and 1919.

From 1916 onwards, a group of influential local figures began to pursue the idea of a single, permanent, municipally funded orchestra, in keeping with the Civic Gospel tradition established in Birmingham under Joseph Chamberlain, that envisaged cities as having responsibility as a body for their citizens' civic, social and cultural welfare. Leading members of this campaign included Neville Chamberlain, who was Lord Mayor of Birmingham from 1916 to 1918; Granville Bantock, composer and Professor of Music at the University of Birmingham; and Ernest Newman, a leading Birmingham-based music critic, who had written as early as 1913 that the system of financial guarantees from wealthy patrons that had supported Birmingham's orchestras through the 19th century had become discredited. The group's first plan was to support Beecham's New Birmingham Orchestra, but this enterprise was wound up after the government requisitioned the Town Hall for the issue of First World War ration books, depriving it of its primary concert venue. A few weeks after the end of the war Bantock revived the idea and on 17 March 1919 he submitted a proposal to Birmingham City Council for an orchestra of 70 musicians to be engaged annually from October to May, at an estimated annual cost of £8,500 and with projected annual revenue of £6,000. The city council agreed to support the proposal with an annual grant of £1,250 for an experimental period of five years, the first time that public funds had been used to support an orchestra anywhere in Great Britain.

=== Early years under Matthews ===
Appleby Matthews

The new orchestra's management committee met for the first time on 19 June 1919 and named itself the City of Birmingham Orchestra or CBO, probably to emphasise its civic status, though it also made clear that the CBO would be a self-governing musical body, not a municipal orchestra along the lines of those commonly found in seaside resorts. During its early years the orchestra was sometimes referred to as the Birmingham City Orchestra, or commonly just the "City Orchestra". Thomas Beecham was considered to be the most suitable candidate for the Principal Conductor role, but he was pre-occupied with his own acute financial problems and had not forgiven the city for its failure to support his earlier New Birmingham Orchestra. As a result, a shortlist of four candidates was drawn up from the numerous applications for the post, though the initial one-year contract came to limit the choice to local applicants. The eventual appointee was Appleby Matthews, who had been running his own orchestra in the city since 1916 and had strong support from local music critics on the selection panel. Richard Wassell was appointed as Assistant Conductor.

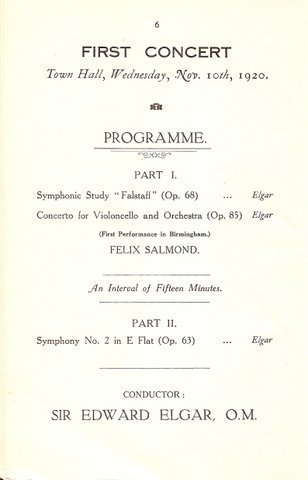
Programme for the first symphony concert, conducted by Edward Elgar on 10 November 1920

Matthews' plan was to hold eight Saturday concerts and six Wednesday concerts each year at Birmingham Town Hall, with a series of 38 concerts of more popular programmes at cheaper venues on Sundays, continuing the tradition of Sunday popular classics established by his own orchestra over the previous five years. The orchestra first rehearsed at 9.30am on 4 September 1920, in the band room at the Birmingham City Police's Steelhouse Lane station. The CBO's first concert was given under Matthews' baton as part of the Sunday series at the Theatre Royal on 5 September 1920, with the first piece of music performed being Granville Bantock's Saul. After two months of preparing the orchestra with the popular concerts, the inaugural concert of the Symphony Concerts series was given at the Town Hall on 10 November 1920, with Edward Elgar conducting a concert of his own works, including his Cello Concerto with Felix Salmond as the soloist. The first season continued with a remarkable series of programmes, including Ralph Vaughan Williams conducting his own London Symphony, Hamilton Harty conducting Berlioz's Symphonie fantastique, Adrian Boult conducting Rachmaninov's Second Symphony, Landon Ronald conducting Brahms' Second Symphony and Jean Sibelius conducting his own Third Symphony. Two features that would become longstanding traditions for the orchestra were also established during this first year: performances of then-recent works by Holst, Vaughan Williams and Bax saw a strong representation of new music in the orchestra's programmes; and from February 1921 the orchestra's commitment to musical education was underlined with a series of concerts for city schoolchildren held in the Town Hall on Saturday afternoons.

Matthews had originally been appointed to be conductor with a fee of £450 for 30 concerts, but had persuaded the committee to give him instead the combined role of conductor, secretary and manager for a fee of £1,000 per year. He had only limited experience in any of these roles, however, and developed a difficult relationship with the politicians and businessmen who made up the CBO committee. His plan to supplement the playing strength of the orchestra with members of the Birmingham City Police band almost caused the orchestra to strike before it had even played a concert, and resulted in questions being asked in the House of Commons in December 1920. Matthews' conducting and his management were both poorly reviewed by Birmingham-based critics, though reviews from outside the city were more positive, with The Daily Telegraph being highly complimentary and the Manchester Guardian concluding "Manchester may well envy Birmingham its municipal music". Matthews' Symphony Series programmes were highly ambitious and enterprising, and he was able to claim that "the amount subscribed for Symphony Concerts constituted a record for any similar series of concerts in this city" but the Sunday concerts were loss-making, with the expensive seats often unsold. In 1922 Matthews was relieved of any involvement in the financial administration of the orchestra, popular concerts were increasingly moved to suburban and out-of-town venues, and development and marketing plans were drawn up to stem a deficit which by May 1923 grown to £3,000. In July the orchestra and Matthews both engaged solicitors and in October Matthews was informed his contract was to be terminated, His final CBO concert was on 30 March 1924, and the relationship dissolved in acrimonious and expensive litigation.

=== Boult and the first "golden period" ===
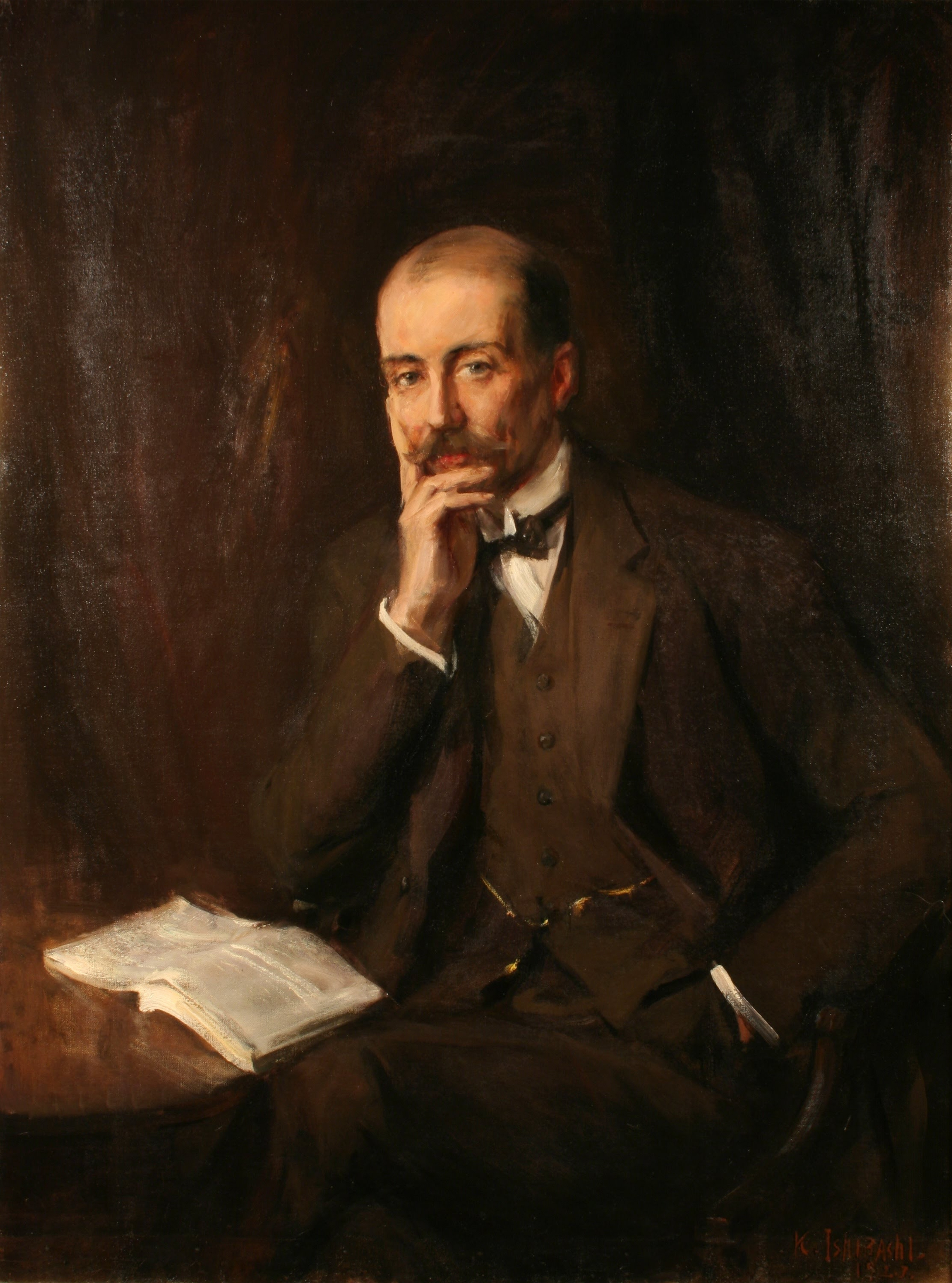
Portrait of Adrian Boult in 1923 by Ishibashi Kazunori

The CBO committee had two candidates in mind to replace Matthews: Eugene Goossens and Adrian Boult. For a while the committee explored the possibility of appointing both as joint conductors, but were convinced by Ernest de Sélincourt that this idea was unworkable. Boult had recently replaced Henry Wood as the conductor of the Birmingham Festival Choral Society – possibly calculating that there might shortly be a vacancy with the City Orchestra – and in March 1924 he was announced in the press as the CBO's new Director and Conductor. At the age of 35 he already had a substantial international musical reputation, having studied at the Leipzig Conservatory under Arthur Nikisch, conducted the world premier of Holst's The Planets at the age of 25, and worked for a period as chief conductor of Sergei Diaghilev's Ballets Russes. The urbane, Oxford-educated Boult was also comfortable dealing with influential local citizens, ensuring the orchestra retained the financial support it needed to continue. His tenure at the CBO would mark the start of a "golden period" for the orchestra that would see it rise to national prominence, outshining the struggling London orchestras and establishing Boult himself as a major figure of British musical life.

Boult brought a wider vision for the orchestra's future, building on Matthews' foundations but expanding beyond them. Some of the leading conductors in Europe were brought in to guest conduct, including Bruno Walter, Pierre Monteux, Ernest Ansermet and Ernő Dohnányi. Boult introduced lunchtime concerts at the Town Hall, inaugurated lectures about forthcoming music on the Thursdays before symphony concerts, invited students from the University of Birmingham to attend open rehearsals, and introduced free concerts for children during school hours. The orchestra made its first commercial recording in 1925. A more unusual experiment took place later the same year, when Saint-Saëns' Second Piano Concerto was performed at the Town Hall with Harold Bauer as soloist, but with his part played not with him present but as a pre-recorded piano roll. A particular concern of Boult's was to reduce the effect of the summer break when, as with London's Queen's Hall Orchestra and Manchester's Hallé Orchestra, the CBO's musicians spent the summer working at seaside resorts and often picked up bad habits freelancing for pier orchestras. The committee felt unable at that time to meet Boult's desire to offer players permanent year-round contracts, but Boult tried to lessen the length of the break by initiating performances at public schools throughout the Midlands. and building up the orchestra's diary of out-of-town concerts.

In a review of Boult's first season, the critic A. J. Sheldon of the Birmingham Post wrote of the immediate impact of Boult's arrival:

The strongest impression is of a very great gain in note accuracy, a much improved ensemble, and a high standard of playing from the string group. The advance made within a single season is so considerable as to be remarkable.

The orchestra also moved into more adventurous repertoire, such as performing Bartók's Dance Suite less than a year after its composition, while the composer was little-known in England. The CBO's performance of Mahler's Fourth Symphony in 1926 was only the third performance of any Mahler symphony given in Britain, and that of Das Lied von der Erde was only the second time it had been performed in England. Both were followed shortly afterwards by performances by orchestras in London and marked the start of the gradual increase in interest in Mahler's work in Britain.

By 1926, the orchestra's finances had improved, helped by the City Council's decision in 1924 to allow Birmingham Town Hall to be used rent-free for the Symphony concerts and in 1925 to double the CBO's grant to £2,500 annually. Less positive was the collapse in October 1925 of the Town Hall's ceiling, leading the orchestra to move its concerts temporarily to Central Hall on Corporation Street. Expenditure on repairing the Town Hall put back prospects of the new concert hall that Boult had been promised, and the reconfiguration of the hall from one gallery to two – engineered by London-based architect Charles Allom without consulting any local musicians – created acoustic problems that would dog the orchestra until its move to Symphony Hall in 1991: the Birmingham Post wrote that "everything sounded strange" and complained of acoustic dead spots in the ground floor and lower gallery. (Note: These structural changes to Birmingham Town Hall were eventually reversed as part of its decade long renovation, completed in 2007.)

One aspect of Boult's time at the CBO was the development of an important relationship with the recently established BBC. The CBO's concert at Birmingham Town Hall on 7 October 1924 was the first orchestral concert anywhere in the world to be transmitted as an outside broadcast, and in 1924 and early 1925 the CBO was used to perform four "International Symphony Concerts" at Covent Garden in London, supplementing the BBC's own "Wireless Players" to form the "Wireless Symphony Orchestra", the forerunner of the BBC Symphony Orchestra. In 1927 the relationship became more problematic as the BBC stopped broadcasting CBO concerts as a result of national dispute with the Musicians Union, and in 1928 upgraded the orchestra at its Birmingham station, luring sixteen of the CBO's most important players away with full-time contracts. In May 1929 the BBC went a stage further, when the retirement of its Music Director Percy Pitt saw Boult offered the role as his replacement. Boult was happy in Birmingham and had planned to stay at least another ten years, but was encouraged to accept the BBC role by Henry Wood. He resisted John Reith's pressure to take up the BBC post immediately and agreed instead to perform a further final season with the CBO. He later said he regretted leaving Birmingham, which provided the only time in his career he was able to fully control his own programmes.

=== Consolidation under Heward ===
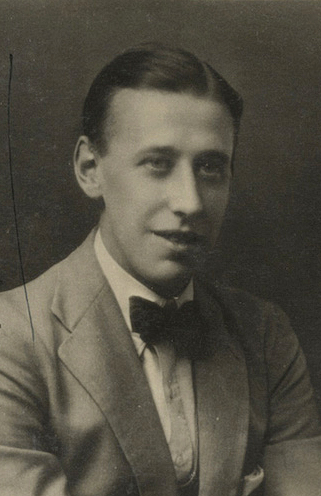
Leslie Heward

Four conductors were shortlisted to succeed Boult and were given trial concerts – Leslie Heward, Stanley Chapple, Julius Harrison and Basil Cameron – but Boult later described how "Heward very easily won the palm". Heward had studied conducting under Boult at the Royal College of Music, where Hubert Parry had described him as "the kind of phenomenon that appears once in a generation". He came to Birmingham from a highly successful period as music director of the South African Broadcasting Corporation and Conductor of the Cape Town Orchestra, where he had raised the standards of the orchestra's playing to the extent that they were invited to England perform at the Empire Exhibition in 1925. Despite this, his appointment was a gamble for the CBO committee, as he was still largely unknown to English audiences.

Heward soon gained the respect of the orchestra's players and the Birmingham audience for his formidable musicianship. His score-reading ability was exceptional and he was able to instantly diagnose problems in rehearsal – the CBO's flautist remarked that he had "never known a conductor who was so much respected by his players." He was also known for his honesty and integrity, sometimes restarting a public performance he felt to be substandard halfway through, saying "I'm sorry, we can do better than that." His programming in Birmingham was bold: 28 of the 41 pieces played in his first season were Birmingham premieres, and the orchestra became particularly known for its interpretations of Dvorak, Sibelius and modern British composers. The orchestra under Heward also began to attract front-rank soloists: Arthur de Greef and Nikolai Orlov performed in 1931; Artur Schnabel played Beethoven's Fourth Piano Concerto in 1933; Ernst Wolff, Arthur Catterall, Egon Petri, Frederic Lamond performed in 1934; Adolf Busch and Solomon in 1936; and in 1938 Béla Bartók played one of his own Piano Concertos.

Assistant conductor Joseph Lewis followed Boult to the BBC Symphony Orchestra in 1931. His eventual replacement, Harold Gray, had started his 55-year-long association with the orchestra as Boult's secretary and musical amanuensis in 1924, and had first conducted the orchestra in 1930 in Sutton Coldfield where he was organist at parish church. Heward was reluctant to talk to audiences and did not enjoy performing for schoolchildren so Gray took over children's concerts in 1931 and was appointed Deputy Conductor in 1932.

The Symphony concerts under Heward drew excellent attendances, but audiences continued to drop for concerts of popular classics as competition from radio and the cinema for leisure time activity increased. Relief from the resulting financial pressure came through a series of arrangements with the BBC. In 1930 the broadcaster agreed to reduce its Birmingham orchestra to an octet – with the redundant musicians being auditioned by the CBO – in return for the CBO performing 13 studio concerts each season: an important step towards permanent year-round contracts for the CBO's players. In 1934 Percy Edgar and Victor Hely-Hutchinson agreed to establish the BBC Midland Orchestra playing 2–3 concerts a week, with Heward as conductor and 35 of its musicians shared with the CBO on 12-month contracts. The stability this brought meant that Heward could build on the achievements of the previous 15 years and by the late 1930s the CBO was playing to a standard comparable to the orchestras of major cities of continental Europe.

By 1939, the CBO's finances were looking sound and its future bright. The outbreak of World War II, however, saw the BBC disband its Midland Orchestra and lay off its musicians, many of whom were also leading players with the CBO. Birmingham Town Hall was commandeered for the war effort and the CBO cancelled all of its engagements, giving Heward six months notice of termination. Although the orchestra started performing again at the Birmingham and Midland Institute in October as the "City of Birmingham (Emergency) Orchestra" and was able to reinstate Heward on a series of temporary contracts, it had lost many of its prewar players, and would be composed only of part-time musicians for much of the war. Compounding the difficulties was Heward's illness. He had contracted tuberculosis during his period in South Africa and was already missing concerts with illness by 1934. Aggravated by overwork, smoking and heavy drinking, his condition deteriorated and he spent six months in a sanatorium from September 1939 to May 1940. He gave his first performance for over a year on 20 October 1940, but regularly had to cancel engagements after that, with most of the CBO's concerts during the period being conducted by Victor Hely-Hutchinson. On Boxing Day 1942 Heward was offered the post of Conductor of the Hallé Orchestra in Manchester, tendering his resignation with effect from the end of the season, but he did not live to see out his contract, dying at his Edgbaston home in May 1943.

=== Post-war doldrums ===
By 1944, the wartime orchestra numbered only 62 musicians, all of whom were part-time and most of whom were employees of local munitions factories. Weekly concerts took place after only a single rehearsal and different players often performed from concert to concert. In an attempt to provide some stability the committee introduced permanent year-round contracts for musicians from May 1944, funded by the city council's education committee in return for 50 days of educational work from the orchestra per year. Boyd Neel was initially favoured to replace Heward as Principal Conductor after 12 different applicants were given trial concerts over the summer of 1943, but the orchestra eventually announced the appointment on a one-year contract of George Weldon, the conductor of the City of Birmingham Choir. Weldon was flamboyant and charismatic with a love of fast cars and he cut a glamorous figure on the podium. Initial critical and public reaction was very positive and in June 1944 he was confirmed as music director. He broadened the orchestra's reach by introducing modestly priced summer seasons of promenade concerts from 1945, and from 1950 introduced industrial concerts aimed at the city's manufacturing workforce, alongside annual seasons in Wolverhampton, Nottingham and Sheffield. In January 1948 the orchestra was officially renamed the City of Birmingham Symphony Orchestra at Weldon's personal request.

Weldon's success in rebuilding the orchestra after the ravages of war was limited, however: he recruited over 40 new musicians during his tenure but by 1951 had only succeeded in increasing the playing strength to 73. Year-round contracts demanded a heavy workload – during the 1945–46 season the orchestra played 260 concerts as well as undertaking educational work in the city's schools – meaning that most concerts were rehearsed only on the day of a performance. Audiences were also unpredictable, and Weldon was criticised for programming too much lightweight repertoire. The era saw some performances of new compositions including major works composed by the orchestra's oboist Ruth Gipps, and September 1946 brought Samuel Barber to Birmingham to conduct his own First Symphony, but Weldon repeated popular works multiple times, often twice or more within the same season. In 1946 Eric Blom criticised the orchestra for over-performance of Vaughan Williams' Fantasia on "Greensleeves'', with the orchestra responding by performing the work in a further concert, backwards. The music critic of the Birmingham Post was dismissed in 1945 for writing that other music journalists in the city were covering up the orchestra's low standards, but by 1948 critics were writing openly of the orchestra's decline. An anti-Weldon lobby formed among Birmingham's musical establishment and unsubstantiated rumours circulated that he was conducting an affair with Gipps. George Jonas, who would later head the CBSO's council of management and started attending CBSO concerts in 1951, later recalled of the period: "a pretty awful sound they made, it was a poor orchestra."

With attendance at CBSO concerts averaging only 60% of capacity, the Birmingham Post ran a series of articles in 1949 arguing for a new approach. By the next year, the orchestra had a deficit of £5,000. In 1951, the incoming executive chairman of the CBSO committee approached Rudolf Schwarz to take over as the orchestra's new chief conductor, letting Weldon know that his contract would not be renewed. John Barbirolli was furious at Weldon's treatment and immediately appointed him Associate Conductor of the Hallé Orchestra, but the committee considered the move a "change to a conductor of a higher calibre" and Weldon's replacement was viewed by the CBSO's players as a forward looking one. Schwarz had a well-established career as an operatic conductor in pre-war Germany, but his role as music director of the Jewish Cultural Organisation in Berlin led to him being interned by the Nazis in Belsen, from where he was rescued in 1945. He was highly respected among musicians and had rebuilt the Bournemouth Symphony Orchestra after World War II. Adrian Boult wrote to him commending Birmingham as having "the nicest people" and assuring him he would enjoy the city, with Schwarz later concluding "He was absolutely right! I found that Birmingham was alive – a city with people who work."

From the start, Schwarz's programming was radically different to Weldon's, reflecting a Central European repertoire alongside many unfamiliar British works. He reserved an entire day per week for rehearsals, which, despite resistance from conservative orchestral players, quickly began to bear fruit, and the orchestra began to attract front-rank soloists again. However, fewer concerts, more rehearsal time and falling attendance led to a worsening financial crisis with a deficit of £20,000 in 1952, and for a period it was suggested the CBSO should merge with the Bournemouth orchestra, performing in Birmingham during the winter and Bournemouth in the summer. When this proposal collapsed, the committee planned instead to reduce the orchestra to a six-month operation, until the incoming Labour council agreed to write off the accumulated deficit in May 1952 with an interest-free loan. At this time the CBSO was by far the smallest of Britain's regional orchestras, but an increase in private donations allowed it to expand the playing staff in 1953, and an administrative reorganisation and further increase in support from the city council began to place it on a firmer financial footing. The orchestra made its first television appearance in 1954 and in 1955 visited the Netherlands on its first overseas tour. Most significant were the performances in 1955 and 1956 of the first of a series of new works commissioned for the orchestra by the John Feeney Charitable Trust – Arthur Bliss's Meditations on a Theme by John Blow and Michael Tippett's Piano Concerto – though reviews of the nationally broadcast premiere of the second still brought criticism from the Musical Times for the orchestra's "shaky playing". Schwarz himself later recalled of his period in charge of the CBSO: "the orchestra did gradually improve, but some of the playing was still not ideal".

=== Panufnik and the return of Boult ===
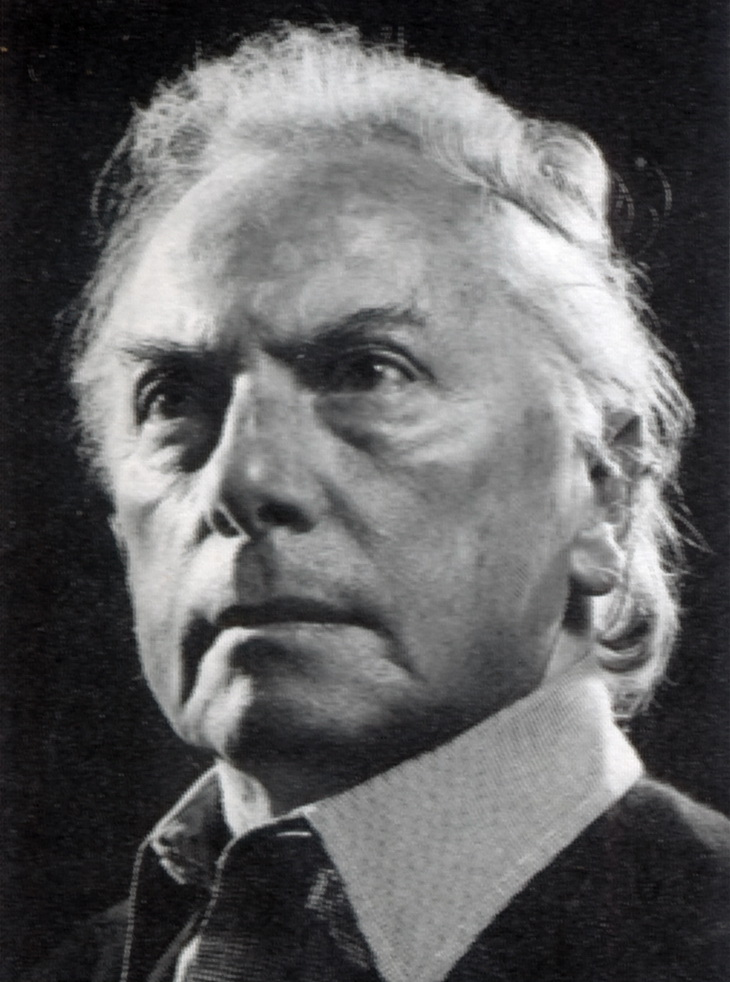
Andrzej Panufnik

In September 1956, Schwarz announced that he would be leaving the CBSO for the BBC Symphony Orchestra at the end of the following season. Press speculation about a successor centred on Hugo Rignold, but it was George Hurst and Andrzej Panufnik who were given trial concerts the following December, and Panufnik who was subsequently appointed after a performance described in the CBSO's official history as "sensationally successful". Panufnik was best known as a composer, but had built a career as a conductor with the Kraków Philharmonic Orchestra and Warsaw Philharmonic Orchestra in his native Poland before defecting to England in 1954. His first season in Birmingham was highly adventurous, featuring the British premieres of works by Ernest Bloch, Gian Francesco Malipiero and Ferenc Farkas. Many early English works for small chamber ensembles were included alongside later classical and romantic repertoire, and some concerts would start with only 13 players on the platform.

Panufnik's arrival in Birmingham coincided with conflict between the orchestra and management after 16 violinists were asked to re-audition for their places, and a strike was only averted by a management climb down. Although he later claimed that he "found the orchestra of a high standard", Panufnik's experience of working with some of Europe's leading orchestras left him dissatisfied with the CBSO's string sound. He had the support of the orchestra's younger players, but his attempts to improve the string section brought him into conflict with the orchestra leader Norris Stanley, who had played with the orchestra since its foundation in 1920 and rejected Panufnik's authority, resisting all attempts at change. Stanley was persuaded to resign in 1958 and was followed by many of the orchestra's old guard, and as a result Panufnik's second season featured less personal conflict. At the insistence of the orchestra's management it also included four of his own compositions. In 1959, however, Panufnik decided not to renew his contract, intending to concentrate instead on composition, explaining "I have learnt one thing. It is impossible to conduct a permanent orchestra and compose at the same time." He continued to have good relations with the orchestra and premiered his Piano Concerto with the CBSO in 1962.

Panufnik's unexpectedly early departure created problems for the CBSO's management, who had intended for him ultimately to be succeeded by Meredith Davies, who had been appointed in 1957 from over 150 applicants as the orchestra's second Associate Conductor alongside Harold Gray. Although Davies was offered the Principal Conductor role and was considered to have the confidence of the players, he felt he was still unprepared for the position and suggested that "an eminent conductor" be appointed for the 1959–1960 season with the intention that Davies would take over the following year. Davies was therefore appointed as Deputy Music Director, and Adrian Boult returned for one year. Boult had given up the role of principal conductor of the London Philharmonic Orchestra two years previously and was still much in demand as a guest conductor, but agreed to return to Birmingham in a move described by Michael Kennedy as "combining nostalgia and a generous rescue act". Boult's season saw him conduct the premiere of Robert Simpson's Violin Concerto with its dedicatee Ernest Element, and a performance of Brahm's 4th symphony described by Robert Matthew-Walker as "the greatest performance of Brahms' fourth symphony I have ever heard." John Waterhouse of the Birmingham Post wrote that under Boult the CBSO again "sounded as good as any orchestra in the country".

=== Rebuilding under Rignold ===
In early 1960 the CBSO committee were still planning for Boult's deputy Meredith Davies to succeed him as Principal Conductor, but Davies had formed an increasingly close working relationship with Benjamin Britten after taking over conducting duties at a CBSO concert of Britten's works, and in March 1960 he left the orchestra to work with Britten's English Opera Group. Two months later Hugo Rignold was announced as the CBSO's new Principal Conductor. Rignold had established his reputation as one of the country's leading conductors during six years at the Liverpool Philharmonic Orchestra, subsequently serving as music director of the Royal Ballet and guest conducting with major orchestras across Britain, Europe and America. He had conducted the CBSO numerous times since 1955 and was noted for his professionalism and technical expertise. He had particular strengths as an orchestra trainer and under him consistent signs of the orchestra's potential began to emerge for the first time since the war.

Relations between the orchestra's management and players at the time was poor. The summer of 1962 saw the musicians unanimously hand in their notice in a wage dispute, and in 1965 the orchestra suffered the only strike in its history after the demotion of Musician's Union steward Wilfred Pook from the first to the second violins – an affair reported in the press as "Pook's pique". Rignold however was seen as bringing stability after the turbulence of the Panufnik era and Boult's stopgap year. The last players remaining from the orchestra's first season in 1920 had retired by 1967, and Rignold proved an astute judge of musicians, introducing many excellent young players to the orchestra and improving professionalism and discipline. He demanded high standards and audiences experienced noticeable improvements. By 1963 the orchestra was seeing much improved reviews in the London press. The growing prestige of the CBSO made it easier to attract international artists: soloists at CBSO concerts included Wilhelm Kempff, Clifford Curzon, Ida Haendel, Paul Tortelier, Isaac Stern and Mstislav Rostropovich; and notable guest conductors included Antal Doráti, Jascha Horenstein, Rudolf Kempe, Ferdinand Leitner and Nadia Boulanger, who conducted a programme of works by her sister Lili Boulanger.

Rignold updated the orchestra's repertoire, conducting 31 premieres during his tenure. The era saw Birmingham's first complete performances of works including Debussy's Images, Ravel's Daphnis et Chloé, Schoenberg's Verklärte Nacht and Walton's Violin Concerto, and a series themed around "Masterpieces of the Twentieth Century" was held in 1966 and 1967. Like Leslie Heward and Rudolf Schwarz before him, Rignold was particularly committed to the music of Sibelius, giving a complete cycle of his symphonies in 1966. The most significant premiere of the period, indeed of the CBSO's entire history, saw the orchestra play the first performance of Benjamin Britten's War Requiem at the dedication of Coventry Cathedral in 1962, accompanied by Peter Pears, Dietrich Fischer-Dieskau, Heather Harper and the Melos Ensemble, conducted by Meredith Davies and the composer himself. This event saw the orchestra attracting international attention for the first time since the first Boult era. The Daily Telegraph described the work as "a masterpiece of the first order", Fischer-Dieskau wept during rehearsals and at the end of the performance Harper noticed that "all around her people were in tears".

The Rignold era also saw modernisation of the CBSO's operations. The orchestra undertook two major European tours in 1963 and 1968, and in 1966 made its first commercial recordings since 1948, producing its first long-playing record. 1963 saw the orchestra solvent and free of debt for the first time in over a decade, leading to an increase in permanent strength to 88. The workload of the orchestra remained extremely high though: throughout the 1960s it gave annual concert series in Coventry, Nottingham, Cheltenham, Dudley, Kidderminster and London as well as regular performances in Leeds and Bristol. It performed two seasons every year supporting Welsh National Opera, which had no orchestra of its own, it accompanied choral societies through the Midlands, and continued to provide 50 days of education work each year in Birmingham schools. Despite playing more concerts than the Liverpool, Hallé or Bournemouth orchestras it received a smaller grant from the Arts Council, until increases in 1966 finally brought the it into line.

=== Frémaux and "the best French orchestra in the World" ===
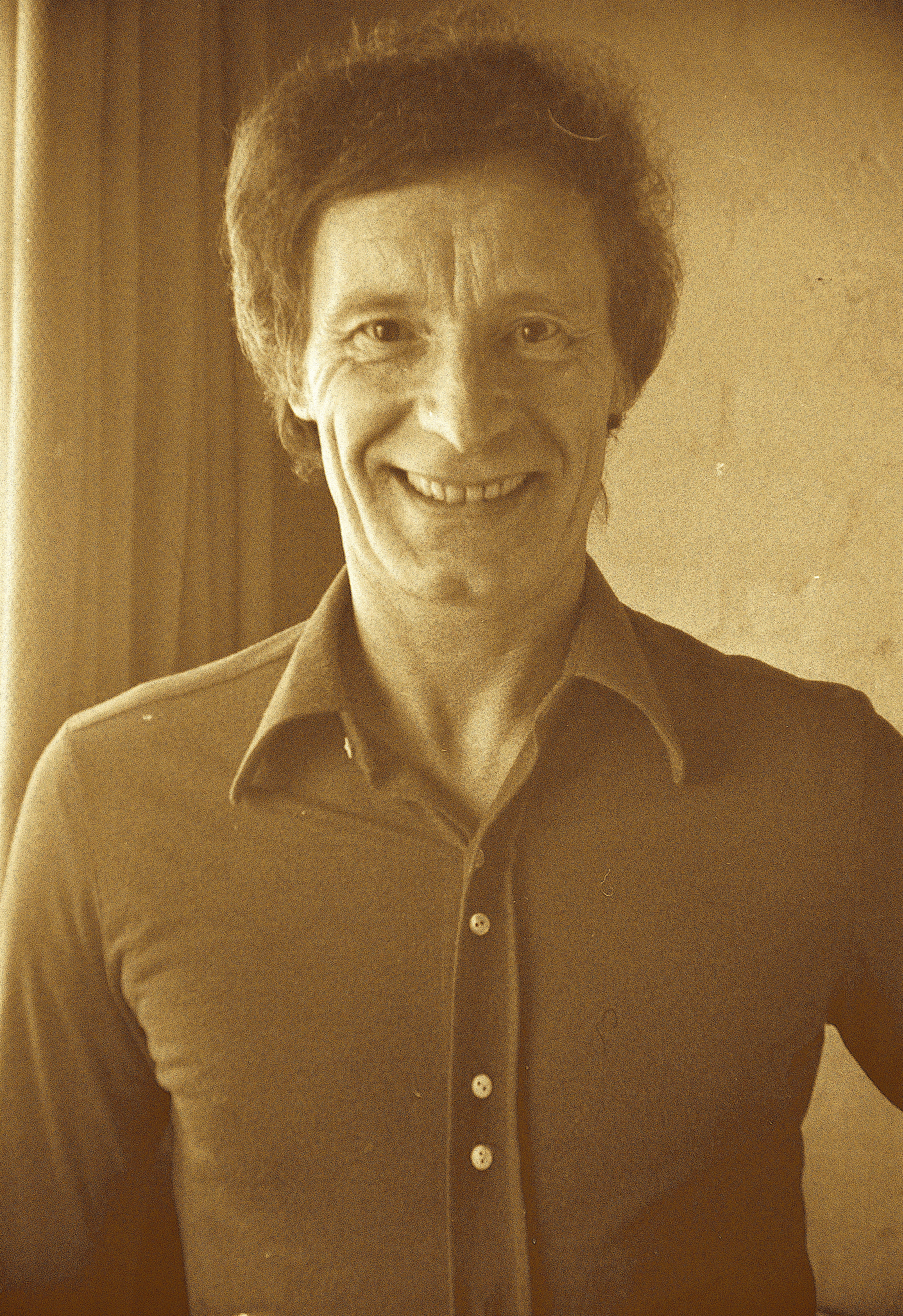
Louis Frémaux

Despite the progress under Hugo Rignold, by the late 1960s the CBSO committee were beginning to look for a new conductor who could take the orchestra further, and in 1967 Rignold resigned after being offered a one-year contract extension instead of having his existing three-year deal renewed. This left the orchestra without a principal conductor for the 1968–1969 season, but also left it free to give trials to potential replacements. Norman Del Mar and Walter Susskind both gave successful concerts, but the strong favourite throughout the process was the conductor of the first concert, the Frenchman Louis Frémaux, whose appointment was announced from autumn 1969. Frémaux had made his reputation with the Monte Carlo Orchestra, particularly for his recordings of French music, releasing over 30 recordings and winning 8 Grand Prix du Disque. For the first three years of his appointment in Birmingham he combined his role with continuing as the founding conductor of the Orchestre Philharmonique Rhône-Alpes in Lyon, but in 1972 he resigned from Lyon to concentrate on his Birmingham activities, performing 70 concerts a season with the CBSO even though only contracted to provide 30.

Frémaux oversaw a vast improvement in the CBSO's orchestral standards, drawing from the orchestra a previously unheard-of precision and verve. Regular sectional rehearsals were brought in from 1970 and Frémaux brought a new emphasis on the recruitment of young principals, setting up a complex system of auditions and trial periods and attending over 900 auditions himself. His opening concert drew "ecstatic" reviews from London critics, and by 1970 The Guardian could write that "there is no better British orchestra outside London". By 1972 the same newspaper was going further, writing that "under Fremaux they combine a purity of intonation which metropolitan orchestras might envy, with a fluid and spontaneous style of phrasing". The commercial success of Frémaux's CBSO recordings for EMI firmly established its reputation for French music, with recordings of Saint-Saëns' Organ Symphony and Berlioz's Grande Messe des morts being particularly successful. Frémaux's CBSO also had a high reputation in romantic repertoire by Dvořák, Schumann and Tchaikovsky as well as twentieth century work such as Shostakovich, Walton and Britten. The distinctive sound that characterised the orchestra under Frémaux was considered less well-suited to classic Viennese repertoire such as Beethoven and Brahms.

The popularity of Frémaux's concerts saw attendances at Birmingham Town Hall increase from an average of 67% in 1968–69 to 88% in 1970–71, with 45% of the audience aged under 25. In response, plans were drawn up by the architect John Madin in 1970 for a new concert hall to be built on the site of Bingley Hall just off Broad Street, and when this scheme was halted by a financial crisis at the city council it was replaced by a proposal from local television station ATV for a multi-purpose exhibition and concert hall as part of its new studio centre. This was turned down by the city council for being impractical, and instead in 1972 the Town Hall was extensively refurbished with double glazing and more room on the platform, but little improvement in acoustics – the orchestra's manager Arthur Baker commented that "we still have the same woolly sound". More positive developments included the orchestra's first commercial sponsorship and the foundation in 1973 of the CBSO Chorus, established under Gordon Clinton to give the orchestra complete artistic control over its choral backing for its burgeoning recording activities.

For all its triumphs, Frémaux's tenure in Birmingham was to end in chaos and acrimony. In 1969 Birmingham City Council had cancelled the CBSO's regular programme of visits to local schools for budgetary reasons. In their place, manager Arthur Baker developed a partnership with promoter Victor Hochhauser for the orchestra to perform lucrative series of mass-market concerts at the Royal Albert Hall in London, but constant travelling away from Birmingham and repetitive popular repertoire began to have a negative effect on player morale. The CBSO in the 1960s and 1970s had a particular reputation for political activism and Frémaux became increasingly uneasy with the amount of internal unrest. Matters were made worse when Frémaux appointed Baker as his personal agent alongside his role as orchestral manager: the players began to feel that Baker was prioritising Frémaux's interests over the orchestra's artistic development and started compiling a dossier of supporting evidence. A humiliating climbdown in a dispute with the players over the seating of a freelance viola player in February 1978 led Frémaux to decide that he would not renew his contract, later complaining that "The union wanted to manage the orchestra. Some of them wanted a revolution." The next month, however, a vote of no confidence from the players in Baker led to his resignation, with Frémaux himself also resigning out of personal loyalty. The players stressed that Frémaux retained their support, but he never conducted the orchestra again.

Although the loss of the orchestra's Manager and music director in a single week was a crisis in the short term, it resulted in a series of longer term changes that would have more positive effects. The Swiss avant-garde composer and conductor Erich Schmid was found at short notice to take over Fremaux's immediate conducting commitments, including a Beethoven festival due to take place less than two months later. The resulting artistic triumph saw him appointed as the orchestra's first Principal Guest Conductor in September 1979. The structure of the orchestra's management committees was reformed, with two elected players' representatives on the main decision-making body to improve communications between musicians and management. Baker's role as General Manager was taken by Ed Smith, who came from the Royal Liverpool Philharmonic Orchestra, where he had worked closely for many years with the conductor of the youth orchestra, Simon Rattle. Rattle had performed four well-received concerts with the CBSO over the previous year and had made no secret of his interest in the Birmingham position. Smith later commented that "Simon was still an unknown quantity to most people, but not, of course, to me. I pushed very hard to have him appointed". For the first time, the appointment of a Principal Conductor required a poll of the musicians as well as the agreement of the committee of management. On 2 July 1979, Rattle was announced as the orchestra's "Principal Conductor and Artistic Advisor". The Birmingham Post wrote of Frémaux that "whatever the circumstances of his going, he was the man who raised the CBSO to the highest point of prestige in its history to date", while Rattle stated that he had inherited "possibly the best French orchestra in the world."

=== Rattle and after ===
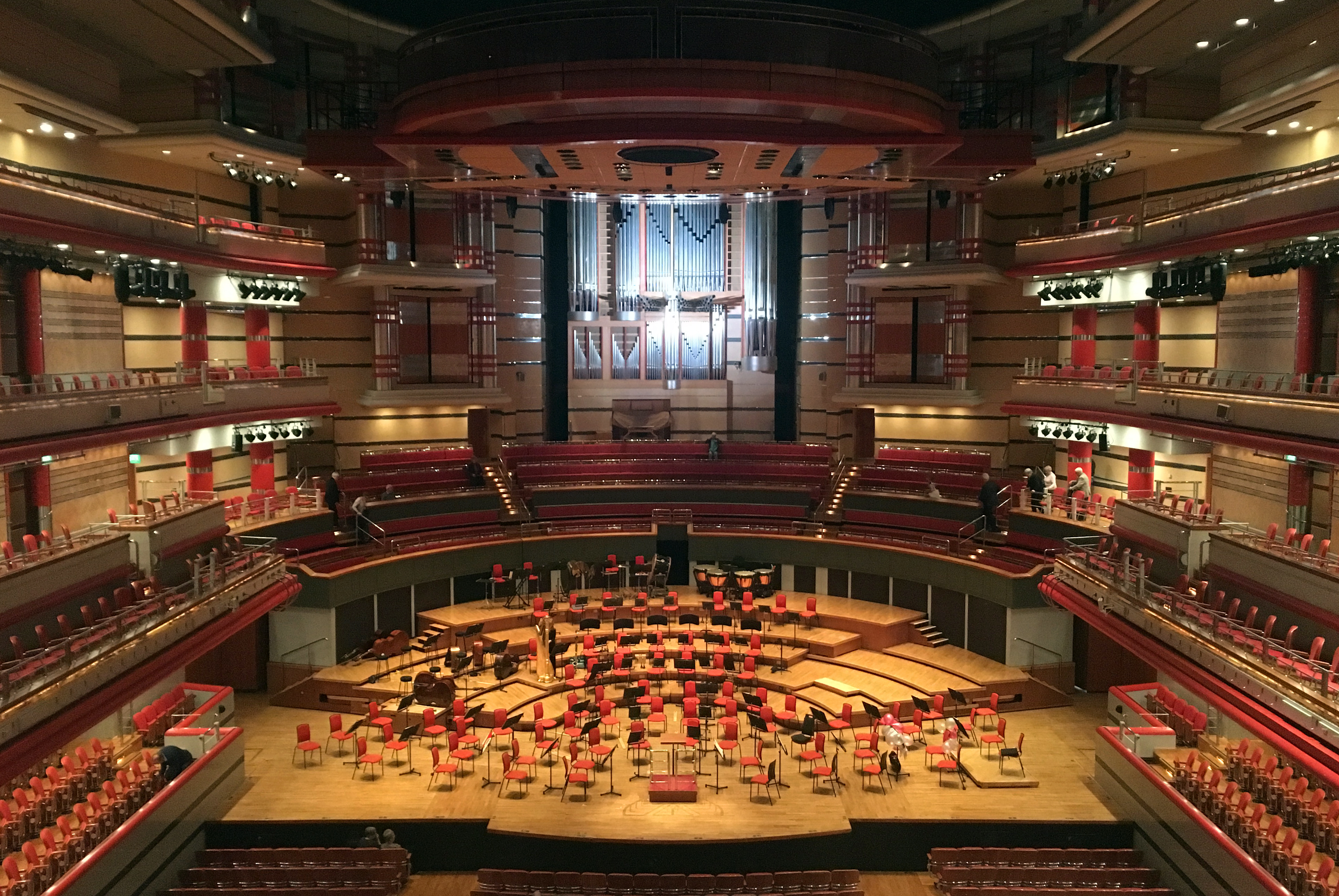
Symphony Hall, the orchestra's home since 1991

The CBSO began to gain greater international renown after Simon Rattle became chief conductor in 1980. Under him, the orchestra increased its recording profile and became one of the leading ensembles in Europe, and gained a name for its interpretations of late romantic and 20th century works, especially those of Sibelius and Gustav Mahler. During this period, the orchestra moved from Birmingham Town Hall to a new home venue, Symphony Hall, inside Birmingham's International Convention Centre. The nearby CBSO Centre, a converted factory, houses management offices, rehearsal facilities, and is a concert venue in its own right, for more intimate performances. The CBSO Youth Orchestra has been affiliated with the CBSO since 2004.

Rattle was named music director of the CBSO in 1990. That same year, the post of Radcliffe Composer in Association was created, with Mark-Anthony Turnage filling the role. In 1995, Judith Weir became Fairbairn Composer in Association, followed in 2001 by Julian Anderson. In the 1990s, Jilly Cooper undertook research for her novel Appassionata at the orchestra.

Following Rattle's departure, Sakari Oramo became chief conductor in 1998, and music director in 1999. His CBSO work included the Floof! festival of contemporary music. He also championed the music of John Foulds in concerts and recordings. In 2001, the players rejected a contract that would have stopped extra payments for broadcasts and recordings, in the context of financial crisis at the CBSO. In addition, other controversy arose from the CBSO's demands from the Arts Council for a greater share of the council's stabilisation fund, because of its reputation compared to other British orchestras. In 2008, Oramo stood down as music director and took the title of principal guest conductor for the 2008–2009 season.

In October 2007, the CBSO named Andris Nelsons as its next music director, effective with the 2008–2009 season. Nelsons' initial contract was for 3 years. The appointment was unusual in that Nelsons had not conducted the CBSO publicly prior to his appointment, but only in a private concert and in a recording session. In July 2009, the orchestra extended Nelsons' contract for another 3 years, through the 2013–2014 season. In August 2012, the CBSO announced the further extension of Nelsons' contract formally through the 2014–2015 season, and then for subsequent seasons on the basis of an annual rolling renewal. In October 2013, the CBSO announced the conclusion of Nelsons' tenure as music director after the conclusion of the 2014–2015 season.

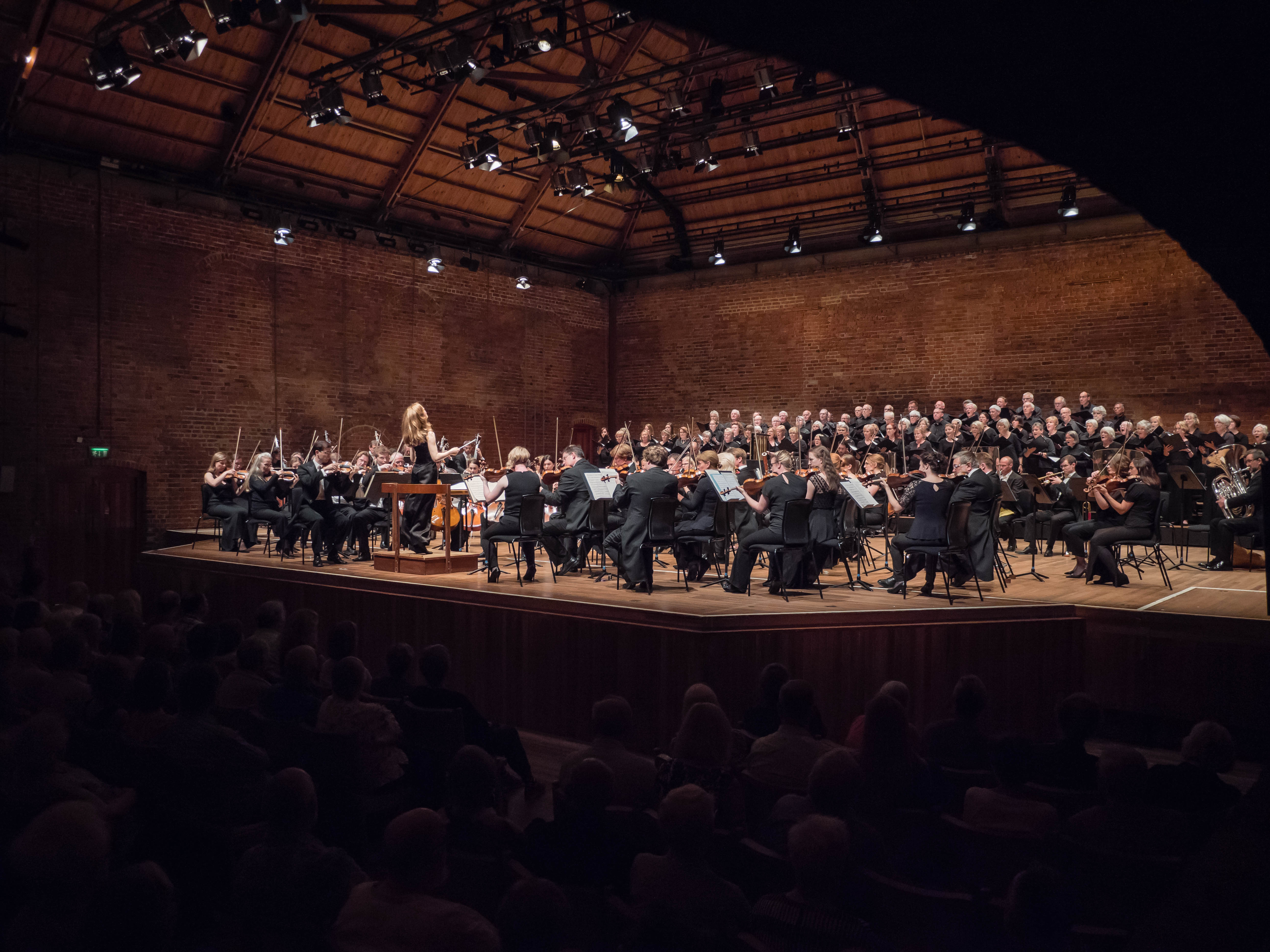
Mirga Gražinytė-Tyla conducting the CBSO at the Aldeburgh Festival in 2017

In July 2015, Mirga Gražinytė-Tyla first guest-conducted the CBSO. In February 2016, the CBSO named her as its next music director, effective September 2016, with an initial contract of 3 years. She was the first female conductor to be named music director of the CBSO and conducted her first concert as CBSO music director on 26 August 2016. She concluded her CBSO tenure at the close of the 2021–2022 season, and took the title of principal guest conductor for the 2022–2023 season. Gražinytė-Tyla currently has the title of associate artist with the CBSO.

Kazuki Yamada first guest-conducted the CBSO in 2012. In May 2018, the CBSO announced the appointment of Yamada as its next principal guest conductor, effective with the 2018–2019 season. In January 2021, the CBSO announced the extension of Yamada's contract as principal guest conductor with CBSO until 2023. In September 2021, the CBSO announced the appointment of Yamada as its next chief conductor and artistic advisor, effective 1 April 2023, with an initial contract of 4.5 years. In May 2024, the CBSO elevated Yamada's title to music director. In January 2025, the CBSO announced an extension of Yamada's contract as its music director through the 2028–2029 season.

The CBSO's current Associate Conductor is Michael Seal. In February 2022, the CBSO announced the appointment of a cohort of six new Assistant Conductors: Bertie Baigent, Olivia Clarke, Otis Enokido-Lineham, Jack Lovell-Huckle, Charlotte Politi and Konstantinos Terzakis. The CBSO's current chief executive is Emma Stenning, as of April 2023, in succession to Stephen Maddock. In October 2025, the CBSO announced the appointments of Ilan Volkov as its next principal guest conductor with an initial contract of three years, and of Alice Sara Ott and Jess Gillam as collaborative artists with initial contracts each of two years, all effective in 2026.

The CBSO has recorded extensively for labels such as EMI Classics, Warner Classics, and Orfeo. The orchestra has also released recordings under its own self-produced label.

== Chief Conductors and Music Directors ==
- Appleby Matthews (1920–1924)
- Adrian Boult (1924–1930)
- Leslie Heward (1930–1943)
- George Weldon (1944–1951)
- Rudolf Schwarz (1951–1957)
- Andrzej Panufnik (1957–1959)
- Adrian Boult (1959–1960)
- Hugo Rignold (1960–1969)
- Louis Frémaux (1969–1978)
- Simon Rattle (1980–1998)
- Sakari Oramo (1998–2008)
- Andris Nelsons (2008–2015)
- Mirga Gražinytė-Tyla (2016–2022)
- Kazuki Yamada (2023–present)

== See also ==
- CBSO Chorus
- CBSO Youth Chorus
- CBSO Children's Chorus
- CBSO Youth Orchestra

== Bibliography ==
- Bolesławska, Beata (2017), The life and works of Andrzej Panufnik (1914–1991), Abingdon: Routledge, ISBN 978-1-351-54292-0
- Bratby, Richard (2019), Forward – 100 years of the City of Birmingham Symphony Orchestra, London: Elliott & Thompson, ISBN 978-1-78396-453-6
- Handford, Margaret (2006), Sounds Unlikely: Music in Birmingham, Studley: Brewin Books, ISBN 978-1-85858-287-0
- Jenkins, Lyndon; King-Smith, Beresford (1983), The Birmingham 78s, 1925–1947: the story of the gramophone records made by the City of Birmingham Orchestra, 1925–1947, Birmingham: City of Birmingham Symphony Orchestra, ISBN 978-0-9508689-0-5
- Kennedy, Michael (1987), Adrian Boult, London: Hamish Hamilton, ISBN 978-0-241-12071-2
- Kenyon, Nicholas (1981), The BBC Symphony Orchestra: the first fifty years, 1930–1980, London: BBC, ISBN 978-0-563-17617-6
- Kenyon, Nicholas (2001), Simon Rattle: from Birmingham to Berlin, London: Faber & Faber, ISBN 978-0-571-20548-6
- King-Smith, Beresford (1995), Crescendo! 75 years of the City of Birmingham Symphony Orchestra, London: Methuen, ISBN 978-0-413-69740-0
