= Michael Seal =

British conductor

- Born: 3 May 1970 (age 56); London, UK
- Education: Royal Birmingham Conservatoire
- Occupations: conductor; violinist
- Organization: City of Birmingham Symphony Orchestra
- Website: michaelseal.com

Michael Seal (born 3 May 1970) is a British orchestral conductor and classical violinist. Since 2011 he has served as the Associate Conductor of the City of Birmingham Symphony Orchestra (CBSO), having served previously as the orchestra's Assistant Conductor. He is only the second conductor to be given the title of Associate Conductor at the CBSO. The first was Harold Gray who served in that capacity for several decades until his retirement in 1972. In addition to his conducting, Seal played in the violin section of the CBSO from 1992 to 2014.

== Life and career ==
Seal was born in London and raised in Rochester, Kent where he began his violin studies at the age of nine. He attended Chatham Grammar School for Boys and played in the Kent County Youth Orchestra, first as a violist and later as the orchestra's first violin and concertmaster. He continued his musical studies at the Royal Birmingham Conservatoire, where he won the Birmingham Philharmonic Concerto Prize. He joined the CBSO as a violinist in 1992.

He began conducting with the Birmingham Philharmonic Orchestra in 1996 and later conducted the CBSO as well as playing in its second violin section. Several times he stepped in to conduct the CBSO on very short notice. In 2004 he substituted Sakari Oramo to conduct the world premiere of Richard Causton's Between Two Waves of the Sea. In 2011 he substituted Ilan Volkov in a concert of Scandinavian music. Seal was appointed Assistant Conductor of the CBSO in 2005 and Associate Conductor in 2011. He relinquished his post in the CBSO's violin section in 2014 to devote himself full-time to conducting.

Seal is also known for his work with youth orchestras. He has served a Principal Conductor of the Birmingham Schools Orchestra and frequently conducts the CBSO Youth Orchestra. As a guest conductor he has conducted several UK and international orchestras, including the BBC Symphony Orchestra, Royal Liverpool Philharmonic Orchestra, Bournemouth Symphony Orchestra, Norwegian Radio Orchestra, and the Brussels Philharmonic.
