= Louis Frémaux =

French conductor (1921–2017)

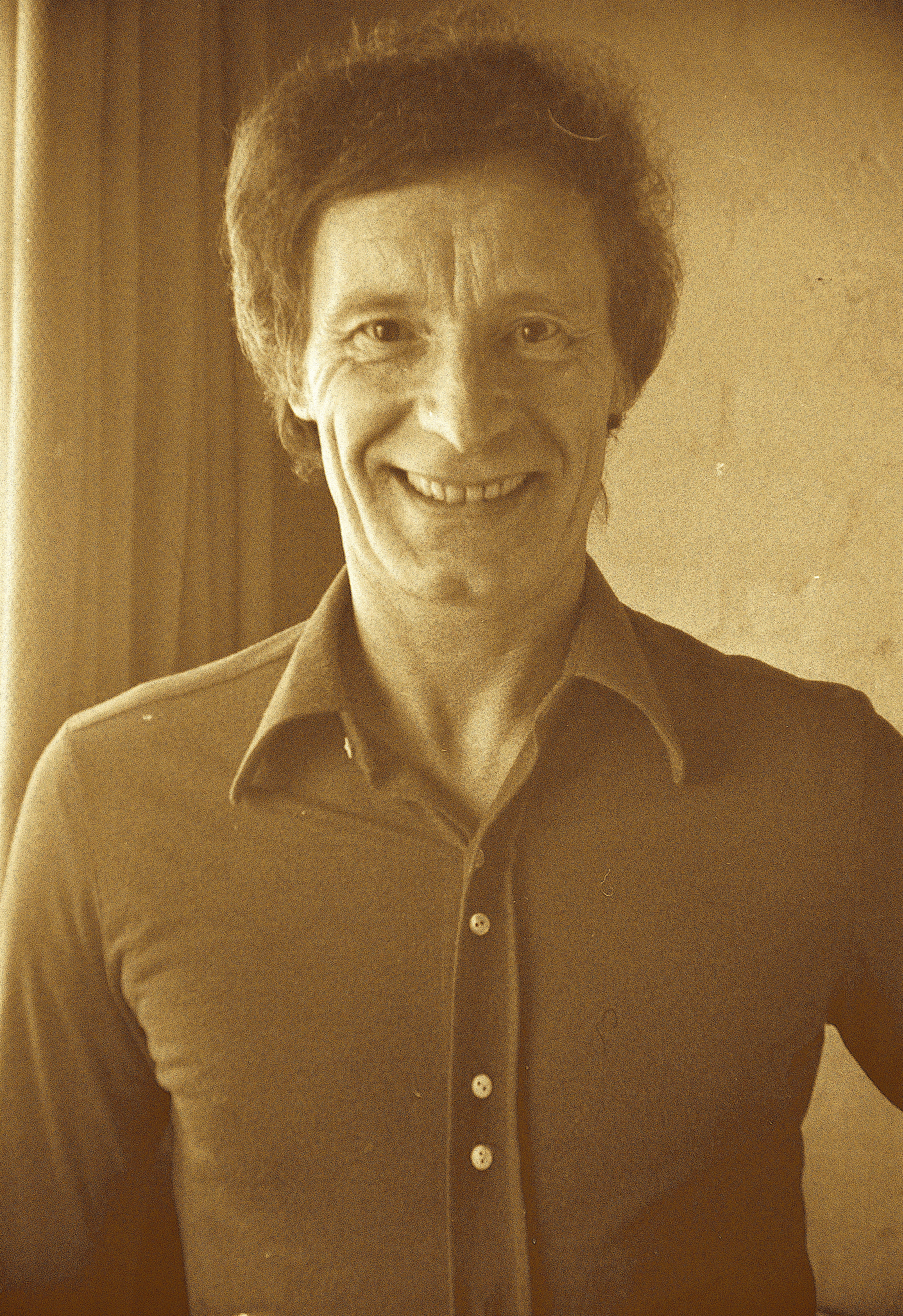
Louis Frémaux (1975)

Louis Joseph Félix Frémaux (13 August 1921 – 20 March 2017) was a French conductor.

== Life and career ==
Frémaux was born in Aire-sur-la-Lys, France and came from an artistic background; his father was a painter, and his wife was a music teacher.

He studied music at the conservatoire in Valenciennes, but his studies were interrupted by the Second World War, when he joined the French Resistance; at the end of the war he was commissioned in the French Foreign Legion and was posted to Vietnam in 1945-46. He entered the Paris Conservatoire in 1947, studied under Louis Fourestier and Jacques Chailley, and graduated in 1952 with a first prize in conducting.

Frémaux worked with the orchestra of the Opéra de Monte-Carlo, after having been released from the French Foreign Legion (to which he had been recalled for service in Algeria) at the request of Prince Rainier. For ten years he helped build the reputation of the Monte Carlo orchestra, as well as conducting opera premieres there. He was the first music director of the Orchestre Philharmonique Rhône-Alpes (later the Orchestre National de Lyon), from 1969 to 1971.

In the UK, Frémaux was principal conductor of the City of Birmingham Symphony Orchestra (CBSO) from 1969 to 1978. During his CBSO tenure, he formed the CBSO Chorus, with the baritone Gordon Clinton as its chorus master. In 1978 he was awarded an honorary DMus from Birmingham University; he also became a member of the Royal Academy of Music. However, his CBSO tenure ended in controversy after the relationship between Frémaux and the orchestra players had broken down.

Frémaux served as chief conductor of the Sydney Symphony Orchestra from 1979 to 1982. He died in March 2017 at the age of 95.

He was made a Chevalier de la Légion d'honneur in 1969.

== Discography ==
In 1963, he recorded a world premiere, Marc-Antoine Charpentier’s, Dialogus inter angelos et pastores Judae in nativitatem Domini H.420, and In nativitatem Domini canticum H.314, with Marie-Claire Alain, organ, Ensemble Vocal Stéphane Caillat and the Orchestre Jean-François Paillard.

By the early 1980s Frémaux had recorded over fifty works, winning a special citation from the Koussevitsky Jury for the 'Nottuni ed Alba' and Second Symphony of John McCabe. Other recordings include Berlioz (Grande Messe des Morts, Symphonie Fantastique), Bizet (Symphony in C, Roma), Delalande (Psalms 12 and 144), Fauré (Requiem), Ibert (Bacchanale, Bostoniana, Louisville Concerto, Divertissement), Poulenc (Gloria, Piano Concerto), Saint-Saëns (Symphony No 3, works for cello and orchestra) and Walton (Gloria, Te Deum, Façade, The Wise Virgins). He also conducted the London Symphony Orchestra in the Symphonie Fantastique (1988) and a Ravel programme of Daphnis et Chloé Suite No. 2, La Valse, the complete ballet Ma Mère l'Oye and Boléro (1989).

Louis Frémaux may be seen as conductor in two piano concertos with Samson François (Ravel Concerto for the Left Hand, Paris, 1964, and Grieg, Paris, 1967), on EMI Classics DVD 490437.

Cultural offices
Preceded by no predecessor	Music Director, Orchestre Philharmonique Rhône-Alpes; 1969–1971	Succeeded by Serge Baudo
