= CBSO Chorus =

Chorus based in Birmingham, England

The CBSO Chorus is a chorus based in Birmingham, England.

== Description ==
It was founded in 1973 as the CBSO Chorus. Simon Halsey has served as Chorus Director since 1983. Between 1995 and 2009 was known officially as The City of Birmingham Symphony Chorus (CBSC). The chorus is allied with the City of Birmingham Symphony Orchestra (CBSO), but unlike the orchestra, the singers are amateur.

Because of its close association with the CBSO, the chorus regularly performs with the orchestra and prioritises its time to the CBSO. It has also performed with other major orchestras such as the Leipzig Gewandhaus Orchestra, the Vienna Philharmonic Orchestra, the Berlin Philharmonic Orchestra, and the San Francisco Symphony Orchestra. The chorus has travelled and toured to all the major concert halls around the UK and has toured Europe, North America, Asia and Australia. It has recorded with both the CBSO and other orchestras, mainly on the EMI Classics label. The chorus rehearses at the CBSO Centre in Birmingham, and its home venue is Symphony Hall.

== Membership ==
Membership of the chorus is by audition. All members are reauditioned every other year. Members come from all walks of life; many are professionals, others are students. Long service awards are presented for every 10 years of service.

The standard is very high and with around 12 - 15 concerts per year. The chorus rehearses on Wednesday evenings and at other times as required for concerts, and has a full-time management team.

== Notable performances ==
The choir performed Mahler's Symphony of a Thousand at the opening of the Sydney Olympic Arts Festival in 2000 during the chorus's World Tour. In Birmingham in October 2000 the chorus was joined by the City of Birmingham Choir for the centenary performances of Elgar's The Dream of Gerontius.

The chorus and youth chorus performed Mahler's Symphony of a Thousand on three occasions in 2002: with the BBC Philharmonic and Gianandrea Noseda at the Bridgewater Hall to open the Commonwealth Games Festival in July 2002 (and also at Symphony Hall and the BBC Proms in August). In May 2002 the chorus accepted an invitation to record live for EMI at the Vienna Musikverein singing in Beethoven's Ninth Symphony with the Vienna Philharmonic and Sir Simon Rattle.

In January 2004 the chorus flew to Helsinki to join the Finnish Radio Symphony Orchestra for the Finnish premiere of Elgar's The Dream of Gerontius (they performed later in the year with the CBSO in Birmingham and Amsterdam). On 31 January 2004, the chorus celebrated its 30th anniversary with a choral programme and, in June, live concert recordings for EMI of Mahler's Symphony of a Thousand with the CBSO and Sir Simon Rattle. In September 2004 the chorus performed for the first time with the Berlin Philharmonic under Sir Simon Rattle at the BBC Proms and at Symphony Hall in performances of Beethoven's Ninth Symphony.

In February 2006 the chorus appeared in Hong Kong at the Hong Kong Cultural Festival, giving a performance of Mahler's Second Symphony with the Hong Kong Philharmonic Orchestra under Edo de Waart and performing Fauré's Requiem under Simon Halsey. October 2006 saw the chorus joining the City of Birmingham Choir and the CBSO to give the Centenary performances of Elgar's The Kingdom.

In June 2007 the chorus took part in the 150th Anniversary of Edward Elgar's birth by performing The Dream of Gerontius, The Apostles and The Kingdom over three days with Sakari Oramo and the CBSO. The chorus then performed The Apostles again with Oramo and the CBSO at The Proms in August and The Dream of Gerontius in St. George's Chapel, Windsor in September at the Windsor Festival with Christopher Robinson and the CBSO.

The 2007–2008 season saw the chorus taking part in the reopening of the Town Hall, Birmingham. In April 2008 the chorus travelled to Kuala Lumpur to perform Vaughan Williams' A Sea Symphony with the Malaysian Philharmonic Orchestra under Martyn Brabbins. In June 2008 they performed Beethoven's Ninth Symphony for the 50th time in the final concert under Sakari Oramo as music director of the CBSO.

In 2013 to mark the centenary of the birth of Benjamin Britten, the CBSA chorus accompanied the orchestra and three solo singers to perform Britten's War Requiem at Coventry Cathedral.

== Recordings ==
The chorus claims many recordings to its credit, including five award-winning releases: Mahler's Symphony No. 2 conducted by Sir Simon Rattle which won Gramophone Record of the Year in 1988; Sir Michael Tippett's A Child of Our Time, conducted by the composer, which was awarded the Preis der deutschen Schallplattenkritik; Szymanowski's Stabat Mater conducted by Sir Simon Rattle, which was awarded the 1995 Gramophone Best Choral Recording. At the 2000 Gramophone Awards the chorus was awarded Best Opera recording for its EMI release of Szymanowski's King Roger with the CBSO and Sir Simon Rattle, and Best Choral recording for its Chandos release of works by Lili Boulanger with the BBC Philharmonic and Yan Pascal Tortelier in 1999. Other recent releases include Walton's Belshazzar's Feast, and Mahler's Symphony No. 3 with the CBSO, and choral works by Fauré with the BBC Philharmonic. In 2006 the chorus released its first completely choral CD under Halsey on the EMI label. In 2007 the chorus featured on a new recording of The Dream of Gerontius with the CBSO and Oramo released for the Elgar 150th birthday celebrations on the CBSO's own label.
