= Leslie Heward =

English conductor and composer

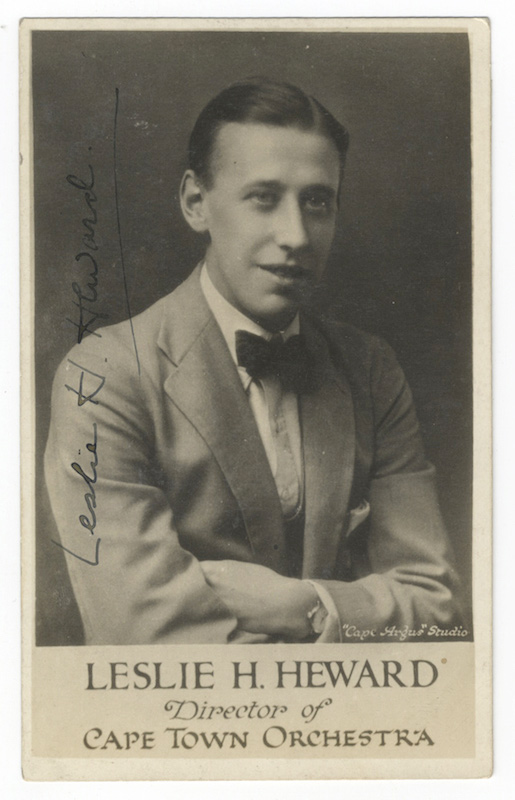
Leslie Heward while he was director of the Cape Town Orchestra

Leslie Hays Heward (8 December 1897 – 3 May 1943) was an English conductor and composer. Between 1930 and 1942 he was the music director of the City of Birmingham Orchestra.

== Early life ==
Heward was born in Liversedge, Yorkshire, the son of a railway porter and organist. He showed remarkable musical promise as a child. By the age of two he was playing the piano, by the age of four he was playing the organ, and by the age of eight he was accompanying a performance of Handel's Messiah on the organ in Bradford. At 12 he was a choir boy at Manchester Cathedral, supported by the organist there, Sidney Nicholson. In 1917 he won a scholarship to the Royal College of Music. There he was one of the first pupils in Adrian Boult's conducting class, and was described by Hubert Parry as "the kind of phenomenon that appears once in a generation". Heward served as Assistant Conductor for Vladimir Rosing's Opera Week at Aeolian Hall in 1921, where he ably reduced the scores of four operas for Adrian Boult's small orchestra.

== Career ==
After leaving the College Heward took teaching posts at Eton and Westminster, became chorus master and subsequently a conductor for the British National Opera Company, and (from 1924 to 1926) was appointed conductor of the Cape Town Orchestra and director of music to the South African Broadcasting Corporation. He broadcast so frequently there that he had to conceal his identity under half-a-dozen aliases. Returning to the UK, Heward took over as conductor of the City of Birmingham Orchestra when Adrian Boult left to become Music Director at the BBC in 1930. Heward gained the respect of the orchestra's players, introduced bold programming, with 28 Birmingham premieres in his first season, and attracted front-rank soloists. In 1934 the BBC asked Heward to conduct the Midland Orchestra, which shared many players with the CBO.

However, the orchestra lost much of its funding and many of its players at the outbreak of World War II. At the same time Heward's health was in decline, his tuberculosis aggravated by smoking and heavy drinking. At the end of 1942 he was offered the post of Conductor of the Hallé Orchestra in Manchester, but was too ill to take up the post. He died at his Edgbaston home (43 Harborne Road, Five Ways, Birmingham) in May the following year, aged just 45.

== Recordings ==
Walter Legge produced all of Heward's recordings for EMI, judging him as "musically speaking the most satisfying conductor this country has had since Beecham. His earliest appearance on record was as the continuo player in Ernest Ansermet’s 1929 Decca performances of Handel's six Concerti Grossi, Op. 6. He was one of the four pianists who recorded Stravinsky’s Les Noces in 1934, produced by Joe Batten for Columbia with the composer conducting. (The other pianists were Berkely Mason, C.E. Benlow and Ernest Lush). But his first recordings for Legge came in 1938, conducting the London Philharmonic Orchestra in Liszt’s Piano Concerto No. 2 and Fantasia on Beethoven’s Die Ruinen von Athen with Egon Petri as the soloist. In 1941 he conducted the Hallé Orchestra in Haydn's Symphony No. 103, the Grieg, John Ireland and Shostakovich piano concertos with Benno Moiseiwitsch and Eileen Joyce, and overtures by Johann Strauss and Borodin. But of particular note was his landmark recording at the end of 1942 with the Halle of E.J Moeran's Symphony in G minor - a work which he had first conducted at its premiere in January 1938 with the London Philharmonic Orchestra.

== Composition ==
Heward was also a composer, but he rarely conducted his own music and destroyed many of his scores. His works include two operas (the early, unfinished Hamlet and Peer Gynt) and several orchestral works, including an early symphonic poem (The Mermaid, 1915), as well as the Dance Suite (1920), Nocturne (1927) and Quodlibet (1931). The Nocturne, broadcast by the BBC on 19 February 1939, was based on music from his opera Peer Gynt. Quodlibet is a substantial suite in five thematically-related movements: 'Exposition', 'Studies', 'Air and Caprice', 'Plaint', and 'Bagatelle'. It was first performed and broadcast on 1 May 1932. Chamber works include a string quartet, the Variations on an Original Theme for two pianos, as well as songs and partsongs, including The Witches' Sabbath (1930) for unaccompanied choir, setting Ben Jonson. He also wrote, arranged and directed the music for an early film, The Loves of Robert Burns (1929).

== Bibliography ==
- Blom, Eric (2001). "Heward, Leslie (Hays)". Grove Music Online. Oxford University Press.
- Bratby, Richard (2019), Forward – 100 years of the City of Birmingham Symphony Orchestra, London: Elliott & Thompson, ISBN 9781783964536
- Jones, Michael (2004). "Heward, Leslie Hays (1897–1943), composer and conductor". Oxford Dictionary of National Biography. Oxford University Press.
- King-Smith, Beresford (1995). Crescendo! 75 years of the City of Birmingham Symphony Orchestra. London: Methuen. ISBN 0413697401.
