= George Halford's Orchestra =

George Halford's Orchestra was a professional symphony orchestra based in Birmingham, England from 1897 to 1907 and an important precursor of the later City of Birmingham Symphony Orchestra.

Halford's orchestra was founded in 1897 by the conductor and composer George Halford, supported by a syndicate of 54 influential Birmingham citizens under the presidency of the city's Lord Mayor. Since 1856 Birmingham's leading permanently-established orchestra had been William Stockley's Orchestra, which had performed regular annual seasons of concerts since 1873. By the end of the century the ageing William Stockley had come to be seen as increasingly outdated and his orchestra was considered to lack players of reputation. Halford sought to establish a permanent orchestra to rival any in the country, to be staffed increasingly with locally based musicians. Its launch was heralded in the local press as "a local musical enterprise exceeding in scope and intention anything within living memory" and "the most important and the most extended orchestral undertaking Birmingham has yet witnessed".

Halford's orchestra had 80 players, led jointly by Ernest Schiever and Fred Ward, who were also the leaders of the Birmingham Festival Orchestra under its conductor Hans Richter. The layout of the orchestra was unusual, with the wind instruments placed in the middle of the platform and the string instruments to the side - an arrangement that the composer Havergal Brian credited with the orchestra's fine ensemble and tutti. Brian later commented on how "Constant playing under its own and distinguished conductors has made the Halford band a most pliable instrument. The attack, the manner - almost effortless - in which a forte rises from the faintest pianissimo, the perfect phrasing, are several features of this fine orchestra."

Concerts were held fortnightly at Birmingham Town Hall on Tuesday evenings between October and March each year. Detailed analytical programme notes about the music to be played were made available ten days before a concert, open rehearsals were given and sometimes concerts were accompanied by lectures from the visiting musicians.

Halford was highly ambitious in his repertoire for the orchestra, his idealism leading him to plan programmes that would challenge his audience. In ten seasons Halford's orchestra gave over 80 works their Birmingham premieres, including pieces by the Russian composers Alexander Borodin, Nikolai Rimsky-Korsakov, Modest Mussorgsky and Alexander Glazunov; the Austrian Anton Bruckner and British composers Edward Elgar, Rutland Boughton, Granville Bantock and Charles Villiers Stanford, as well as neglected works by Bach, Beethoven and Mozart. Two complete cycles of Beethoven symphonies were given, one season saw all of the orchestral works of Brahms performed, and during the 1900-1901 season many concerts were dedicated to the work of a single composer, with nights devoted to Wagner, Tchaikovsky and Mendelssohn.

Halford's orchestra was taken seriously by many outstanding musicians from outside the city and composers were often invited to conduct performances of their own music. On 21 January 1902 Edward Elgar conducted the orchestra in his own Cockaigne and his first two Pomp and Circumstance Marches; and on 20 December 1904 the composer Richard Strauss conducted a programme consisting of his three tone poems Don Juan, Death and Transfiguration and Ein Heldenleben. Rachmaninov's Piano Concerto No. 2 was to have been given its British premiere by Alexander Siloti with Halford's orchestra in Birmingham on 4 March 1902, but the concert had to be cancelled due to the soloists's illness. The Musical Times indicated that the concert was first planned to take place even earlier and Havergal Brian asserted that Rachmaninov had written the work specifically for Halford. The orchestra also attracted prestigious soloists: as well as Siloti pianists who performed alongside Halford's orchestra included Ferruccio Busoni, Ernő Dohnányi, Arthur De Greef, Percy Grainger, Frederic Lamond and Egon Petri; violinists included Adolph Brodsky, Lady Hallé, Willy Hess, Joseph Joachim, Émile Sauret, Eugène Ysaÿe and Fritz Kreisler.

Although Halford's concert series were considered artistically successful by critics, attendances were variable and in 1901 the Halford Concerts Society was established to cover financial losses, with members guaranteeing at least five pounds to provide Halford's organisation financial security to allow his adventurous programming to continue. By 1906, however, interest and support for the orchestra was declining and the standard of performances was increasingly coming under attack by the critic Ernest Newman of the Birmingham Post.

In 1906 Halford's players reformed into the self-governing Birmingham Symphony Orchestra, which was run on cooperative lines and continued to perform until 1918 – one of several competing orchestras that filled the gap between the decline of Halford's orchestra and the birth in 1920 of the City of Birmingham Orchestra, later the City of Birmingham Symphony Orchestra. Halford gave four more concerts under his own name in 1907 and remained as Music Director of the new orchestra, but conducted only half of its concerts, with the remainder conducted by visiting conductors.

== Bibliography ==
- Handford, Margaret (2006). Sounds Unlikely: Music in Birmingham. Studley: Brewin Books. ISBN 1858582873.
- Harlow, Martin (1999). "Mr Halford's Orchestral Concerts 1897-1907. Conductor at Large". The Musical Times. 140 (1867). Musical Times Publications Ltd.: 49–53. doi:10.2307/1193895. JSTOR 1193895.
- King-Smith, Beresford (1995). Crescendo! 75 years of the City of Birmingham Symphony Orchestra. London: Methuen. ISBN 0413697401.
