= Unsolved! =

2017 book by Craig P. Bauer

The History and Mystery of the World’s Greatest Ciphers from Ancient Egypt to Online Secret Societies
- Author: Craig P. Bauer
- Language: English
- Subject: Cryptology
- Genre: Non-fiction
- Publisher: Princeton University Press
- Publication date: May 22, 2017
- Publication place: United States
- Pages: 640
- ISBN: 978-1-40088-479-7

Unsolved! The History and Mystery of the World’s Greatest Ciphers from Ancient Egypt to Online Secret Societies is a 2017 book by American mathematician and cryptologist Craig P. Bauer. The book explores the history and challenges of various unsolved ciphers, ranging from ancient scripts to modern codes and puzzles. The book also invites readers to try their hand at cracking the ciphers, offering clues and hints along the way. The book received positive reviews from critics and readers, who praised its engaging style, comprehensive coverage, and intriguing content.

== Author ==
Craig P. Bauer is an American mathematician, cryptologist, and author. He is a professor of mathematics at York College of Pennsylvania, where he teaches courses on cryptography, linear algebra, and discrete mathematics. He is also the editor-in-chief of the international journal Cryptologia. He has been a scholar-in-residence at the National Security Agency’s Center for Cryptologic History.

== Contents ==
The book's first chapter is devoted to Voynich Manuscript, which has earned the reputation of being the "book no one can read" due to its unknown language and script, as well as its obscure illustrations. Bauer devotes almost 90 pages to this subject, delving into its historical and cryptographic aspects. He traces the origins and provenance of the manuscript, examines its structure and content, and evaluates various attempts to decode its secrets.

The second chapter, titled "Ancient Ciphers", focuses on the writings and symbols found on Greek vases, Egyptian sarcophagi, and other objects from ancient times. The author explains that most of these inscriptions are not encrypted messages, but rather require knowledge of the languages and scripts used by the people that produced them. Third chapter features the Dorabella cryptogram, a cipher composed of semicircles that remains undeciphered for over a century.

Bauer devotes three consecutive chapters (4, 5, and 6) to the analysis of ciphers related to crimes. Chapter 4 examines the case of the Zodiac Killer, a notorious serial murderer who taunted the police and the public with cryptic messages. Bauer offers a comprehensive overview of the Zodiac Killer's history, modus operandi, and unsolved ciphers. Chapter 5, titled "More Killer Ciphers", focuses on the Henry Debosnys case. Debosnys was executed in 1883 for killing his wife in Essex County, New York. He left behind encrypted notes that have never been deciphered. The chapter also discusses other criminal cases involving encryption, such as the Masked Man (Germany) and the disappearance of Susan Powell (USA). In these cases, the suspects used crypto software to conceal their data from the authorities. Bauer explores the challenges and possibilities of cracking these modern ciphers.

In chapter 6, Bauer examines three cases of encrypted messages left by crime victims. The first case is that of Ricky McCormick, whose body was found in a field in Missouri in 1999, along with two notes written in an unknown code. This case has received considerable attention from the U.S. media and the public, but remains unsolved. The second case is that of the Somerton Man, a man who was found dead on a beach in Adelaide, Australia, in 1948, with a scrap of paper bearing the words "Tamam Shud" and a cipher hidden in a pocket of his trousers. The third case is that of Paul Rubin, who died of cyanide poisoning in 1953, leaving behind a note with a series of letters and numbers that have never been deciphered. Bauer conducted extensive research on the Rubin case, uncovering new facts and documents that shed light on his life and death. He also obtained a scan of the original Rubin cryptogram, which he included in his book. Previously, only a partial photograph of the note had been available to the public.

Chapter 7 delves into attempts to use ciphers to prove the possibility of communication with the dead. Bauer describes intriguing challenges for codebreakers that were presented by these experiments. In chapter 8, the book focuses on one of the most enduring challenge ciphers in the history of cryptography, presented by Joseph O. Mauborgne, a prominent U.S. cryptologist, in 1915. The book explains the challenge, provides historical context, and proposes a hypothesis that Mauborgne used a wheel cypher to encrypt his message.

Chapter 9 of "Unsolved!" explores various ciphers that have defied decryption attempts. The author addresses a few classic examples, such as the D’Agapeyeff challenge, Feynman cryptograms, Chinese gold bar ciphers, Shugborough inscription, and Kryptos sculpture. The author argues that final part of Kryptos was encrypted with a matrix-based cipher. The chapter also covers more recent crypto mysteries, such as Cicada 3301, a mysterious online puzzle with unknown origin and purpose, the Fenn Treasure, a hidden cache of gold and jewels with a cryptic poem as a clue, and the PCCTS series of encrypted messages from a self-proclaimed secret society. This chapter also describes the Beale Ciphers, which are a set of three cryptograms that allegedly contain the coordinates of a hidden treasure. Bauer argues that the whole story is a hoax and that the ciphers are unsolvable. He contrasts this with another famous case of a pirate treasure linked to a cryptogram: the Levasseur treasure. Olivier Levasseur was a pirate who buried a treasure somewhere before his execution. He supposedly left behind a cryptogram written in Pigpen cipher. Bauer explains how the Pigpen cipher works and how it can be cracked with frequency analysis. He suggests that the Levasseur cryptogram might be genuine and that his treasure might still be out there, waiting to be discovered.

Tenth chapter explores the topic of long ciphers encrypted with complex and obscure methods. In addition to the Voynich Manuscript, which was discussed in the first chapter, the book analyzes two other prominent examples of this category: James Hampton's notebook and the Codex Rohonci. The book also mentions some modern artistic ciphers, such as the Penitentia Manuscript and the Ricardus Manuscript by Gordon Rugg, and the Book of Woo from the webcomic Sandra and Woo.

The final chapter of the book explores the possibility of extraterrestrial communication and the cryptographic challenges involved in deciphering it. It also examines the RSA Factoring Challenge, a series of mathematical problems posed by the RSA Laboratories in 1991, and the Time Capsule Crypto Puzzle, a long-term cryptographic experiment devised by Ron Rivest in 1999. The author acknowledges that there are many more unsolved cryptograms in history and invites the reader to pursue them further.

The book provides a comprehensive index, extensive notes, and a rich bibliography of references and further reading. It also contains numerous illustrations.

== Reception ==
Andrew Robinson, a writer and historian of cryptography and writing systems, in his review in Nature praises the book’s scope, logic, speculation and challenges presented to cryptography enthusiasts. The review also notes some drawbacks, such as the varying level of mathematical knowledge required and the omission of some notable examples of decipherment of ancient scripts.

The review by Peter Dabbene in Foreword magazine praises the book as fascinating and appealing to both newcomers and experienced code breaker, mentioning the book’s wide range of topics and its accessible style. The review notes that readers who prefer to avoid darker material, such as accounts of serial murder cases, may choose to skip certain chapters, but despite that the book still offers engaging material on topics such as espionage, hidden treasure, and secret societies. The reviewer recommends the book to all who enjoy the thrill of the chase.

The review in Cryptologia by Klaus Schmeh, a German computer scientist and crypto history blogger, praises Unsolved! as a major contribution to the crypto history literature and a must-read for codebreakers. Schmeh commends Bauer for his extensive research, his captivating writing style, and his coverage of both classic and modern cipher mysteries. Schmeh also appreciates Bauer’s skepticism and focus on the cryptographic properties of the unsolved cryptograms, rather than the speculative theories that surround them. Schmeh notes a few errors and omissions in Unsolved!, such as the nature of the error in K3 of the Kryptos sculpture, and the lack of discussion of modern cryptography, but hopes that Bauer will address them in future publications.

== Solved ciphers ==
Some of the cryptograms described in the book were deciphered after its publication. "The Masked Man" revealed his passwords in 2016, which allowed his data to be decrypted. In 2020, the 340-character Zodiac cipher was solved. The "Somerton Man" was identified based on genetic genealogy. The Fenn treasure was found. The English translation of the Book of Woo was published by its creator.
