= List of ciphertexts =

Some famous ciphertexts (or cryptograms), in chronological order by date, are:

Year of origin	Ciphertext	Decipherment status
179–180	Papyrus Oxyrhynchus 90	Unsolved
1400s (15th century)	Voynich manuscript	Unsolved
1500s (16th century) (?)	Rohonc Codex	Unsolved
1586	Babington Plot ciphers	Solved
1600s	Borg cipher	Solved in 2016
17th century	Great Cipher	Solved
1730	Cryptogram of Olivier Levasseur	Unsolved (unvalidated decryption provided by author Charles de La Roncière in his 1934 novel 'Le Flibustier Mystérieux'.)
1760–1780	Copiale cipher	Solved in 2011
1843	"The Gold-Bug" cryptogram by Edgar Allan Poe	Solved (solution given within the short story)
1882	Debosnys cipher	Unsolved
1885	Beale ciphers	Partially solved (1 out of the 3 ciphertexts solved between 1845 and 1885)
1897	Dorabella Cipher	Unsolved
1903	"The Adventure of the Dancing Men" code by Arthur Conan Doyle	Solved (solution given within the short story)
1917	Zimmermann telegram	Solved within days of transmission
1918	Chaocipher	Solved
1918–1945	Enigma machine messages	Solved (broken by Polish and Allied cryptographers between 1932 and 1945)
1939	D'Agapeyeff cipher	Unsolved
1939–1945	Purple cipher machine messages	Solved (broken by Allied cryptographers in 1940)
1941	Lorenz SZ42 machine cipher messages	Solved (broken by Allied cryptographers in 1942)
1944	Pigeon NURP 40 TW 194	Unsolved
1948	Tamam Shud case	Unsolved
1950(?)	James Hampton's script	Unsolved
1969	Zodiac Killer ciphers	Partially solved (2 out of the 4 ciphertexts solved between 1969 and 2020)
1977	The Magic Words are Squeamish Ossifrage	Solved in 1993–1994
1983	Decipher	Solved
1986	Decipher II	Partially solved (all 4 ciphertexts solved between 1985 and 1986, but the solution to the 4th ciphertext has since been lost)
1987	Decipher III	Unsolved
1990	Kryptos	Partially solved (3 out of the 4 ciphertexts solved between 1992 and 1999)
1991	Scorpion ciphers	Unsolved
1999	Ricky McCormick's encrypted notes	Unsolved
2006	Smithy code, embedded within the 2006 judgment on The Da Vinci Code case	Solved within month of publication
2012–2016	Cicada 3301 puzzles	Partially solved (2 out of 3 puzzles solved)
2015	11B-X-1371	Solved
2020	Noita Eye Messages	Unsolved

== See also ==
- Undeciphered writing systems (cleartext, natural-language writing of unknown meaning)
