= Unsolved =

Unsolved may refer to:

- Unsolved (album), a 2000 album by the American band Karate
- Unsolved (British TV programme), a 2004–2006 British crime documentary television programme that aired on STV in Scotland
- Unsolved (South Korean TV series), a 2010 South Korean television series
- Unsolved (U.S. TV series), a 2018 American television series
- Unsolved!, a 2017 book about cryptography by Craig P. Bauer
- Unsolved: The Boy Who Disappeared, a 2016 online series by BBC Three
- The Unsolved, a 1997 Japanese video game
- BuzzFeed Unsolved, a show by BuzzFeed discussing unsolved crimes and haunted places
- Lists of unsolved problems

== See also ==
- Solved (disambiguation)
- Unsolved Mysteries, an American true crime television program that debuted in 1987
