= Solved =

Solved may refer to:

- Solved (TV series)
- Solved (album), an album by MC Frontalot
- Solved (EP), an EP by Svoy
- solved game

== See also ==
- Solution (disambiguation)
- Resolution (disambiguation)
- Unsolved (disambiguation)
