= James Gillogly =

James J. Gillogly (born 5 March 1946) is an American computer scientist and cryptographer.

== Biography ==
=== Early life ===
His interest in cryptography stems from his boyhood, as did his interest in mathematics. By junior high he was inventing his own ciphers and challenging his father, entomologist Lorin Gillogly, to solve them.

Gillogly wrote a chess-playing program in the Fortran programming language in 1970, and in 1977 he ported the code for "Colossal Cave" from Fortran to C.

=== Education ===
He graduated from Carnegie Mellon University in 1978, receiving a Ph.D. in computer science. He was advised by Allen Newell, with his dissertation titled "Performance Analysis of the Technology Chess Program".

=== Career ===
Gillogly worked as a computer scientist at RAND, specializing in system design and development, and computer security. He has written several articles about technology and cryptography, is currently the editor of the "Cipher Exchange" column for The Cryptogram, and was president of the American Cryptogram Association.

Gillogly was one of the earliest authors of personal computer software, writing utility programs, games and a computerized cookbook published by the Software Toolworks beginning in 1980.

=== Cryptanalysis ===
He is best known for his work solving or debunking some of the world's most famous unsolved codes. In 1980 he wrote a paper on unusual strings in the Beale ciphers, and he received international media attention for being the first person to publicly solve parts 1-3 on the CIA's Kryptos sculpture in 1999. He also coordinates a large mailing list about the ciphers in the Voynich Manuscript. On the PBS website, they report that he has been called "arguably the best non-government cryptanalyst in the U.S." in the field of classical (historical) cryptosystems.

In 1995 he deciphered a text enciphered by Robert H. Thouless who had hoped the message could prove that the dead could communicate with the living. Gillogly wrote his own software to decipher the text, which was in a variant of the playfair cipher.

== Selected articles ==
- Articles by Gillogly at rand.org, 1970–1994
  - MAX: A FORTRAN Chess Player", 1970, RAND Paper
  - Exploratory modeling: search through spaces of computational experiments", 1994, RAND Reprint
  - "The impact of response options and location in a microcomputer interview on drinking drivers' alcohol use self-reports", 1990, Rand Corporation, co-written with Ron D. Hays, Robert M. Bell, Laural A. Hill, Matthew W. Lewis, Grant N. Marshall, Ronald Nicholas, Gordon Marlatt
  - "The Technology Chess Program", 1972, Artificial Intelligence, Volume 3, pp. 145–163
  - Cryptograms from the Crypt
  - "The Beale Cipher: A Dissenting Opinion", April 1980, Cryptologia, Volume 4, Number 2
  - "Ciphertext-Only Cryptanalysis of Enigma", October 1995, Cryptologia, Volume 19, Number 4

== See also ==
- Cryptanalysis of the Enigma
