= Beale ciphers =

Set of three ciphertexts

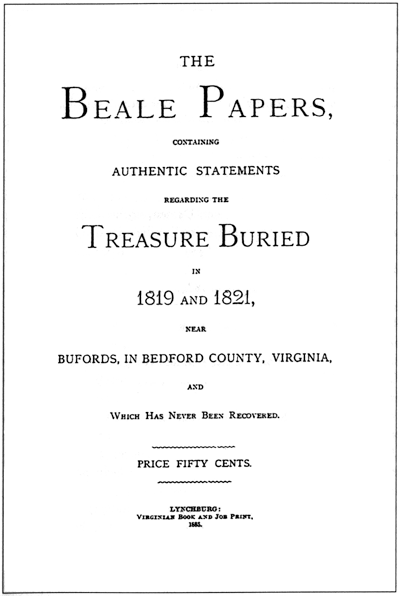
Cover of The Beale Papers

The Beale ciphers are a set of three ciphertexts, one of which allegedly states the location of a buried treasure of gold, silver and jewels estimated to be worth over $60 million as of January 2025. Comprising three ciphertexts, the first (unsolved) text describes the location, the second (solved) ciphertext accounts the content of the treasure, and the third (unsolved) lists the names of the treasure's owners and their next of kin.

The story of the three ciphertexts originates from an 1867 pamphlet called The Beale Papers, detailing treasure being buried by a man named Thomas J. Beale in a secret location in Bedford County, Virginia, in about 1820. Beale entrusted a box containing the encrypted messages to a local innkeeper named Robert Morriss and then disappeared, never to be seen again. According to the story, the innkeeper opened the box 23 years later, and then decades after that gave the three encrypted ciphertexts to a friend before he died. The friend then spent the next 20 years of his life trying to decode the messages, and was able to solve only one of them, which gave details of the treasure buried and the general location of the treasure. The unnamed friend then published all three ciphertexts in a pamphlet which was advertised for sale in the 1880s.

Since the publication of the pamphlet, a number of attempts have been made to decode the two remaining ciphertexts and to locate the treasure, but all efforts have resulted in failure.

There are many arguments that the entire story is a hoax, including the 1980 article "A Dissenting Opinion" by cryptographer Jim Gillogly, and a 1982 scholarly analysis of The Beale Papers and their related story by Joe Nickell, using historical records that cast doubt on the existence of Thomas J. Beale. Nickell also presented linguistic evidence demonstrating anachronisms—words such as "stampeding", for instance, are of later vintage. His analysis of the writing style showed that Beale was almost certainly James B. Ward, whose 1885 pamphlet brought the Beale ciphers to light. Nickell argues that the tale is thus a work of fiction, specifically a "secret vault" allegory of the Freemasons; James B. Ward was a Mason himself.

== Background ==
A pamphlet published in 1885, entitled The Beale Papers, is the source of this story. The treasure was said to have been obtained by an American named Thomas J. Beale in the early 1800s, from a mine to the north of Nuevo México (New Mexico), at that time in the Spanish province of Santa Fe de Nuevo México (an area that today would most likely be part of Colorado). According to the pamphlet, Beale was the leader of a group of 30 gentleman adventurers from Virginia who stumbled upon the rich mine of gold and silver while hunting buffalo. They spent 18 months mining thousands of pounds of precious metals, which they then charged Beale with transporting to Virginia and burying in a secure location. After Beale made multiple trips to stock the hiding place, he then encrypted three messages: the location, a description of the treasure, and the names of its owners and their relatives. The treasure location is traditionally linked to Montvale in Bedford County, Virginia.

Beale placed the ciphertexts and some other papers in an iron box. In 1822, he entrusted the box to a Lynchburg innkeeper named Robert Morriss. Beale told Morriss not to open the box unless he or one of his men failed to return from their journey within 10 years. Sending a letter from St. Louis a few months later, Beale promised Morriss that a friend in St. Louis would mail the key to the cryptograms; however, it never arrived. It was not until 1845 that Morriss opened the box. Inside, he found two plaintext letters from Beale, and several pages of ciphertext separated into papers "1", "2", and "3". Morriss had no luck in solving the ciphers, and decades later left the box and its contents to an unnamed friend.

The friend, then using an edition of the United States Declaration of Independence as the key for a modified book cipher, successfully deciphered the second ciphertext which gave a description of the buried treasure. Unable to solve the other two ciphertexts, the friend ultimately made the letters and ciphertexts public in a pamphlet entitled The Beale Papers, which was published by yet another friend, James B. Ward, in 1885.

Ward is thus not "the friend". Ward himself is almost untraceable in local records, except that a man with that name owned the home in which a Sarah Morriss, identified as the spouse of Robert Morriss, died at age 77, in 1863. He also is recorded as becoming a Master Mason in 1863.

The images below, transcribed from the pamphlet, show the original line-breaks for easy comparison. In the second cryptogram, the original cipher errors are highlighted in red.

Beale's first cryptogram

Beale's second cryptogram (the deciphered one)

Beale's third cryptogram.

== Deciphered message ==
The plaintext of paper number 2 reads:

I have deposited in the county of Bedford, about four miles from Buford's, in an excavation or vault, six feet below the surface of the ground, the following articles, belonging jointly to the parties whose names are given in number three, herewith:

The first deposit consisted of ten hundred and fourteen pounds of gold, and thirty-eight hundred and twelve pounds of silver, deposited Nov. eighteen nineteen. The second was made Dec. eighteen twenty-one, and consisted of nineteen hundred and seven pounds of gold, and twelve hundred and eighty-eight of silver; also jewels, obtained in St. Louis in exchange to save transportation, and valued at thirteen thousand dollars.

The above is securely packed in clay pots, with iron covers. The vault is roughly lined with stone, and the vessels rest on solid stone, and are covered with others. Paper number one describes the exact locality of the vault, so that no difficulty will be had in finding it.

The second cipher can be decrypted fairly easily using a modified copy of the United States Declaration of Independence, but some editing is necessary. To decrypt it, one finds the word corresponding to the number (e.g., the first number is 115, and the 115th word in the Declaration of Independence is "instituted"), and takes the first letter of that word (in the case of the example, "I").

Beale used a version of the United States Declaration of Independence slightly different from the original, and made mistakes in numbering it. To extract the hidden message, the following five modifications must be applied to the original text:

- after word 154 ("institute") and before word 157 ("laying"), one word must be added. The pamphlet handles this by inserting "a" before "new government".
- after word 240 ("invariably") and before word 246 ("design"), one word must be removed (probably "a"). The pamphlet's numbering has eleven words between the labels for 240 and 250.
- after word 466 ("houses") and before word 495 ("be"), ten words must be removed (probably "He has refused for a long time after such dissolutions"). The pamphlet has two labels for 480.
- after word 630 ("eat") and before word 654 ("to"), one word must be removed (probably "the"). The pamphlet's numbering has eleven words between the labels for 630 and 640.
- after word 677 ("foreign") and before word 819 ("valuable"), one word must be removed (probably "their"). The pamphlet's numbering has eleven words between the labels for 670 and 680.

Furthermore:

- Words 78 and 79 ("self-evident"), shown hyphenated, are counted as two words.
- The first letter of word 95 ("inalienable") is always used as a "u" ("unalienable").
- Words 509 and 510 of the modified text ("mean time") are counted as two words, despite being shown as one word.
- The first letter of the 811th word of the modified text ("fundamentally") is always used by Beale as a "y".
- The first letter of the 1005th word of the modified text ("have") is always used by Beale as an "x".

Finally, in the decoded text there are six errors, probably due to wrong transcription of the original paper:

- ... 84, 57, 540, 217, 115, 71, 29, 84 (should be 85), 63, ... consistcd ("consisted").
- ... 53 (should be 54), 20, 125, 371, 38, 36, 10, 52, ... rhousand ("thousand").
- ... 2, 108 (should be 10, 8), 220, 106, 353, ... itron ("in iron").
- ... 440 (should be 40), 370, 643, 466, ... uith ("with").
- ... 14, 73, 84 (should be 85), ... thc ("the").
- ... 807, 81, 96 (should be 95), 405, 41, ... varlt ("vault").

Additional Declaration differences affect paper number 1: word 210 of the modified text ("more") is shown as "now"; words 919 and 920 of the modified text ("fellow citizens") are shown hyphenated (also affects paper number 3); two extra words ("made" and "the") are shown in modified text positions 1058 and 1188; a word is removed ("of") after modified text position 1125. The other slight changes probably have no consequences.

Many versions of the Declaration of Independence have been printed, with various adjustments to paragraphing, word inclusion, word changing, spelling, capitalization, and punctuation.

The lack of clear images of the original ciphers, combined with the large quantity of numerals, has led to numerals being misprinted or omitted in many sources.

The Beale Papers text, on pages 20 to 21, gives an alleged translation of the second ciphertext, but it has nine differences from the actual one. The differences are shown here as {alleged decipherment | actual decipherment}:

I have deposited, in the county of Bedford, about four miles from Buford's, in an excavation or vault, six feet below the surface of the ground, the following articles, belonging jointly to the parties whose names are given in number {“3,” | three} herewith:

The first deposit consisted of {one thousand | ten hundred} and fourteen pounds of gold, and {three thousand | thirty-} eight hundred and twelve pounds of silver, deposited {November, 1819 | Nov. eighteen nineteen}. The second was made {December, 1821 | Dec. eighteen twenty-one}, and consisted of nineteen hundred and seven pounds of gold, and twelve hundred and eighty-eight {pounds | } of silver; also jewels, obtained in St. Louis in exchange {for silver | } to save transportation, and valued at {$13,000 | thirteen thousand dollars}.

The above is securely packed in iron pots, with iron covers. The vault is roughly lined with stone, and the vessels rest on solid stone, and are covered with others. Paper number {“1” | one} describes the exact locality of the vault, so that no difficulty will be had in finding it.

=== Value ===
The treasure's total weight is about three tons, as described in inventory of the second cryptogram. This includes approximately 35,052 troy ounces of gold, 61,200 troy ounces of silver (worth about US$96.3 million and US$1.8 million, respectively, in October 2024) and jewels worth around US$220,000 in 2017.

== Authenticity ==
There has been considerable debate over whether the remaining two ciphertexts are real or hoaxes. An early researcher, Carl Hammer of Sperry UNIVAC, used supercomputers of the late 1960s to analyze the ciphers and found that while the ciphers were poorly encoded, the two undeciphered ones did not show the patterns one would expect of randomly chosen numbers and probably encoded an intelligible text. Other questions remain about the authenticity of the pamphlet's account, and its background story has several implausibilities, being based almost entirely on circumstantial evidence and hearsay.

Items that raise doubt about the ciphers include:

- The second message, describing the treasure, has been deciphered, but the others have not, suggesting a deliberate ploy to encourage sustained interest in deciphering the other two texts, which would prove to be impossible. The second message even cross-references the first one, despite Beale supposedly wanting to send Morris a key to all of the three ciphers altogether. Also, the original sale price of the pamphlet, 50 cents, was a high price for the time ($17.92 in 2025), and the author wrote that he expected "a wide circulation".
- If the modified Declaration of Independence is used as a key for the first cipher, it yields alphabetical sequences such as abcdefghiijklmmnohpp and others. According to the American Cryptogram Association, the chances of such sequences appearing multiple times in the one ciphertext by chance are less than one in a hundred million million. Although it is conceivable that the first cipher was intended as a proof of concept letting decoders know that they were "on the right track" for one or more of the subsequent ciphers, such a proof would be redundant, as the success of the key with respect to the second document would provide the same evidence on its own.
- Later cryptographers have claimed that the two remaining ciphertexts have statistical characteristics which suggest that they are not actually encryptions of an English plaintext. Alphabetical sequences such as abcdefghiijklmmnohpp are both non-random, as indicated by Carl Hammer, and not words in English.
- Others have also questioned why Beale would have bothered writing three different ciphertexts (with at least two keys, if not ciphers) for what is essentially a single message in the first place, particularly if he wanted to ensure that the next of kin received their share (as it is, with the treasure described, there is no incentive to decode the third cipher).
- Analysis of the language used by the author of the pamphlet (the uses of punctuation, relative clauses, infinitives, conjunctives, and so on) has detected significant correlations between it and the writing style of Beale's letters, including the plaintext of the second cipher, suggesting that they may have been written by the same person.
- The letters also contain several English words, such as "improvise", not otherwise recorded before the 1820s in English but used from French from 1786 in the New Orleans area, and stampede (Spanish) "an uproar". Beale's "stampeding" apparently first appears in print in the English language in 1832 but was used from 1786 to 1823 in New Orleans in French and Spanish.
- The third cipher appears to be too short to list 30 individuals' next of kin.
- Robert Morriss, as represented in the pamphlet, says he was running the Washington Hotel in 1820, yet contemporary records show he did not start in that position until at least 1823.
- A common literary device of fiction is the story of finding a treasure map or other information that will, purportedly, lead to buried treasure, from Edgar Allan Poe's "The Gold-Bug" to Robert Louis Stevenson's Treasure Island to Milton Caniff's Terry and the Pirates.

There have been many attempts to break the remaining cipher(s). Most attempts have tried other historical texts as keys (e.g., Magna Carta, various books of the Bible, the U.S. Constitution, and the Virginia Royal Charter), assuming the ciphertexts were produced with some book cipher, but none have been recognized as successful to date. Breaking the cipher(s) may depend on random chance (as, for instance, stumbling upon a book key if the two remaining ciphertexts are actually book ciphers); so far, even the most skilled cryptanalysts who have attempted them have been defeated. Of course, Beale could have used a document that he had written himself for either or both of the remaining keys or either a document of his own or randomly selected characters for the third source, in either case rendering any further attempts to crack the codes useless.

=== Existence of Thomas J. Beale ===
A survey of records in the 1810 United States census shows two persons named Thomas Beale, one in Connecticut and one in New Hampshire. However, the population schedules from this census are missing for seven states, one territory, the District of Columbia, and 18 of the counties of Virginia. The 1820 United States census has three persons named Thomas Beale, one each in Louisiana, Tennessee, and Virginia—the one living in Virginia is listed with "K" as a middle initial. However, the population schedules from this census are missing for three states and one territory.

Before 1850, the U.S. Census recorded the names of only the heads of households; others in the household were only counted. Beale, if he existed, may have been living in someone else's household. In addition, a man named "Thomas Beall" appears in the St. Louis postmaster's list of 1820; according to The Beale Papers, Beale sent a letter from St. Louis in 1822. The 1820 census has 11 persons named Thomas Beall; seven in Maryland and one each in Georgia, Ohio, Virginia, and the District of Columbia.

=== Poe's alleged authorship ===
Researcher Robert Ward and others have suggested Edgar Allan Poe as the pamphlet's real author. Poe had an interest in cryptography and placed notices of his deciphering abilities in the Philadelphia paper Alexander's Weekly (Express) Messenger that invited submissions of ciphers for him to solve. In 1843, he used a cryptogram as a plot device in his short story "The Gold-Bug". From 1820, he was also living in Richmond, Virginia, at the time of Beale's alleged encounters with Morriss. In February 1826, Poe enrolled as a student at the University of Virginia in Charlottesville, but with mounting debts, he left for Boston in April 1827. One theory is that he left the Beale papers with his sister Rosalie Mackenzie Poe, who gave out pieces of it along with other memorabilia related to her brother until her death in 1874.

However, research and facts debunk Poe's authorship. He died in 1849, well before The Beale Papers were first published in 1885. The Beale Papers also mention the American Civil War, which started in 1861. William Poundstone, an American author and skeptic, had stylometric analysis performed on the pamphlet for his 1983 book Biggest Secrets, and found that Poe's prose is significantly different from the grammatical structure used by the author who wrote The Beale Papers.

=== Statistical analysis ===
Another method to check the validity of the ciphers is to investigate some statistical aspects in different number bases. For example, one can investigate the frequency of the last digit in each number in the ciphers. These frequencies are not uniformly distributed—some digits are more common than others. This is true for all three ciphers.

However, if one considers a base that is relatively prime to 10, then the last digits of the numbers in the unsolved ciphers turn uniform – each digit is equally common. The frequency of the solved cipher stays non-uniform. This indicates a complex behaviour in the solved cipher as one might expect from an encoded message, while the unsolved ciphers have a simpler behaviour.

Humans have limited abilities when it comes to random number generation. One explanation for the difference between base 10 and other bases is that the unsolved ciphers' numbers were manufactured by a human in base 10, which would strongly suggest that the unsolved ciphers are fraudulent.

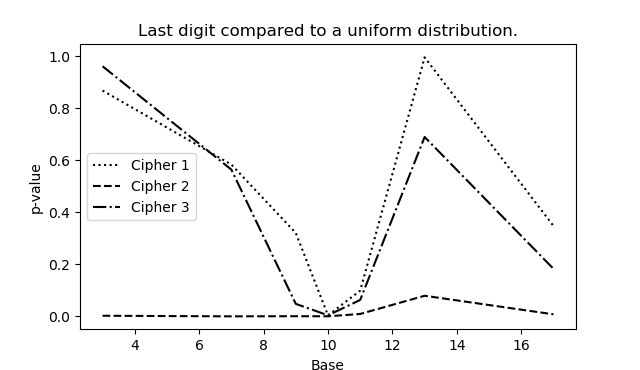
Statistical analysis of the last digits in the Beale ciphers. The solved cipher (2) differs significantly from the uniform distribution in all bases, but this is only true for the unsolved ones (1 and 3) in base 10. This strongly suggests that the unsolved ciphers are fraudulent. The analysis is based on a permutation Kolmogorov–Smirnov test.

== Search attempts ==
Despite the unproven veracity of The Beale Papers, treasure hunters have not been deterred from trying to find the vault. The "information" that there is buried treasure in Bedford County has stimulated many expeditions with shovels, and other implements of discovery, looking for likely spots. For more than a century, people have been arrested for trespassing and unauthorized digging; some of them in groups, as in the case of people from Pennsylvania in the 1990s.

Several digs were completed at the top of Porter's Mountain, one in the late 1980s with the land owner's permission as long as any treasure found was split 50/50. However, the treasure hunters found only Civil War artifacts. As the value of these artifacts paid for time and equipment rental, the expedition broke even.

== Media attention ==
The story has been the subject of multiple television documentaries, such as the UK's Mysteries series, a segment in the seventh special of Unsolved Mysteries; and the 2011 Declaration of Independence episode of the History Channel TV show Brad Meltzer's Decoded. There are also several books, and considerable Internet activity. The Beale Cipher Association published a newsletter from 1979 through 1996. Simon Singh's 1999 book The Code Book discusses the Beale cipher mystery in one of its chapters.

In 2010, an award-winning animated short film was made concerning the ciphers called The Thomas Beale Cipher. In 2014, the National Geographic TV show The Numbers Game referred to the Beale ciphers as one of the strongest passwords ever created. In 2015, the UKTV series Myth Hunters (also known as Raiders of the Lost Past) devoted one of its season three episodes to the topic. A February 2015 episode of the series Expedition Unknown saw host Josh Gates visit Bedford to investigate the Beale ciphers and search for the treasure. In 2024, Dave Howard from Popular Mechanics wrote an article with interviews from a number of researchers who had been working to break the Beale ciphers.

In the film, The Imitation Game, John Cairncross uses a Beale cipher to encode messages he sends to the Soviet Union about Enigma intercepts at Bletchley Park. Hugh Alexander finds that the key is based on Matthew 7:7: "Ask, and it shall be given you; seek, and ye shall find; knock, and it shall be opened unto you."

== See also ==
- List of ciphertexts
- Rennes-le-Château – a similar case where encrypted documents, discovered in a church in France, allegedly refer to a hidden treasure
- Oak Island mystery – an alleged undiscovered buried treasure on Oak Island in Nova Scotia
- Captain Kidd – a 17th-century pirate who is supposed to have left behind clues to buried treasure
- Treasure of Lima – another legendary lost treasure
- Lost Dutchman's Gold Mine – legendary lost treasure
