= Borg cipher =

17th-century manuscript

- Vatican Library, MSS-Borg.lat.898
- Date: 1600s
- Language(s): Arabic, Italian, Latin, encrypted in abstract symbols and Roman letters with diacritics
- Size: 408 pages
- Contents: Medical recipes for treating symptoms and diseases
- Other: Deciphered in 2016

The Borg cipher is an encrypted manuscript, probably from the 1600s, describing treatment of symptoms and diseases. The manuscript consists of 408 handwritten pages. The only unencrypted parts are the first page in Arabic, some fragments and headings in Latin, and the last two pages in Italian. It is stored at the Vatican Library under the name MSS-Borg.lat.898.

== Cipher ==
The cipher includes 34 different characters, including graphic signs and Roman letters with diacritics. It was decoded in 2016 by Nada Aldarrab, Kevin Knight and Beáta Megyesi.

== See also ==
- List of ciphertexts
