= Ricky McCormick's encrypted notes =

Unsolved encrypted message associated with unsolved homicide

- Found with body of McCormick in St. Charles County, Missouri
- Date: June 30, 1999
- Language: Unknown cipher
- Author: Unknown
- Discovered: June 30, 1999

The partially decomposed body of Ricky McCormick was discovered in a field in St. Charles County, Missouri, on June 30, 1999. Sheriffs found two garbled hand-written notes – apparently written in secret code – in the victim's pockets, and these were handed over to the FBI for further investigation. Attempts by the FBI's Cryptanalysis and Racketeering Records Unit (CRRU) and the American Cryptogram Association failed to decipher the meanings of those two coded notes, which are listed as one of the CRRU's top unsolved cases. On March 29, 2011, the U.S. Federal Bureau of Investigation issued an appeal for help from the public in obtaining the meaning of the messages. A few days later, they updated their website to note the "outpouring of responses", and established a separate page where the public can offer comments and theories.

== Death ==
=== Victim ===
Ricky McCormick
- Born: Ricky C. McCormick; June 14, 1958
- Died: c. June 25–28, 1999 (aged 41); Missouri
- Known for: Circumstances of death and encrypted notes
- Children: 4

Ricky McCormick was a high school dropout who had held multiple addresses in the Greater St. Louis area, living intermittently with his elderly mother. According to a 1999 article in the St. Louis Post-Dispatch, McCormick suffered from chronic heart and lung problems. He was not married, but had fathered at least four children. He had a criminal record, and had previously served 11 months of a three-year sentence for statutory rape. At the time of his death, he was 41 years old, unemployed, and receiving disability welfare payments.

=== Discovery of body ===
McCormick's body was found on June 30, 1999, in a cornfield near West Alton, Missouri, by a woman driving along a field road near Route 367. The reason he was 15 miles (24 km) away from his then-current address is another mystery, as he did not own a car and the area was not served by public transportation. Though the body had already somewhat decomposed, authorities used fingerprints to identify McCormick. No one had reported him missing. McCormick was last seen alive five days earlier, on June 25, 1999, getting a checkup at St. Louis's now-defunct Forest Park Hospital. Though authorities treated the death as a possible homicide, they were unable to determine a cause of death or possible motive.

== Description ==
The two notes found in McCormick's pockets are written in an unknown code consisting of "a jumble of letters and numbers occasionally set off with parentheses" and are believed by the FBI to possibly lead to those responsible for the killing. Dan Olson, chief of the FBI's Cryptanalysis and Racketeering Records Unit, said, illustrating the significance of the notes, "Breaking the code could reveal the victim's whereabouts before his death and could lead to the solution of a homicide." Attempts by both the FBI's Cryptanalysis and Racketeering Records Unit (CRRU) and the American Cryptogram Association failed to decipher their meaning, and Ricky McCormick's encrypted notes are currently listed as one of CRRU's top unsolved cases, with McCormick's killer yet to be identified.

The Ricky McCormick Notes

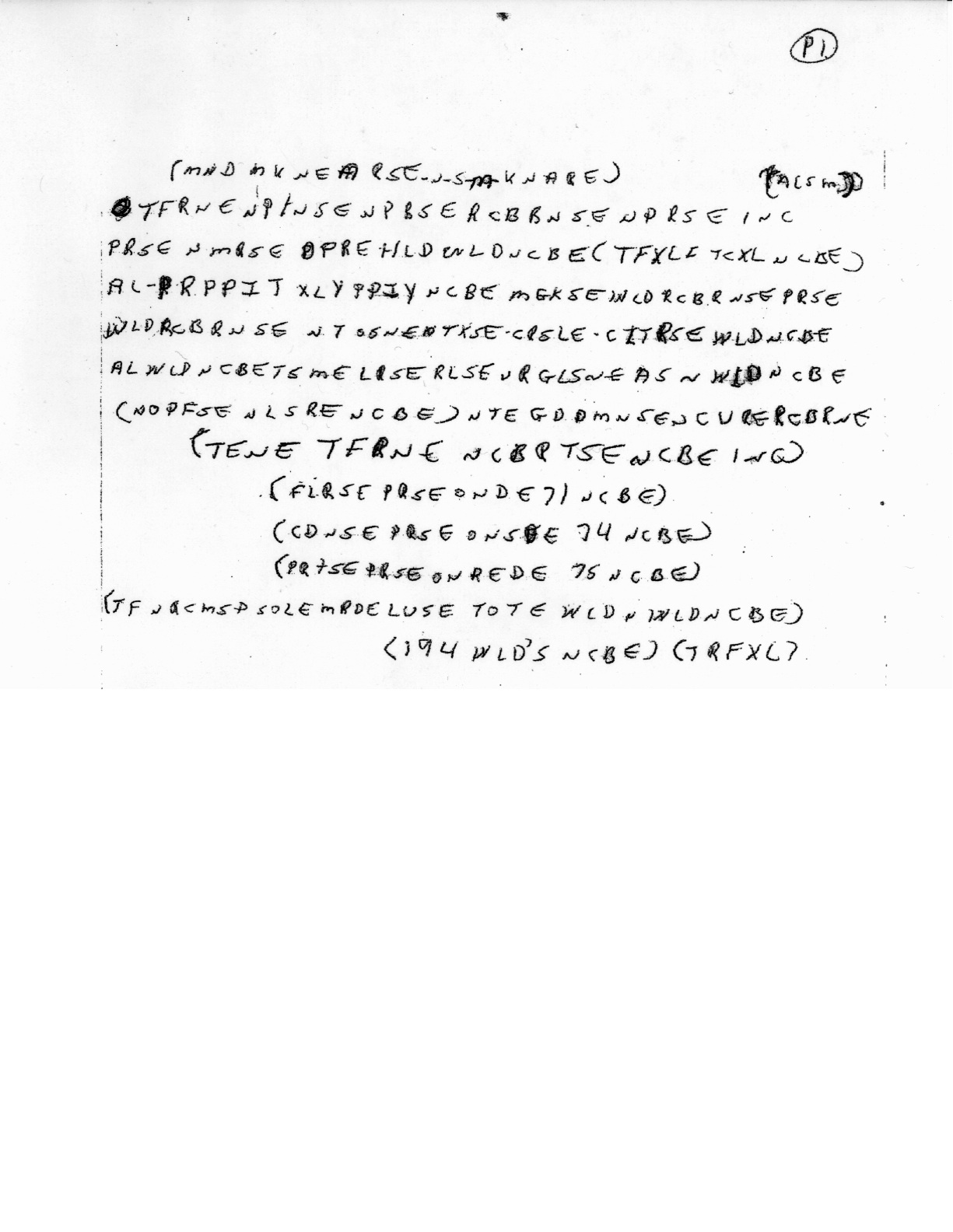
Note 1

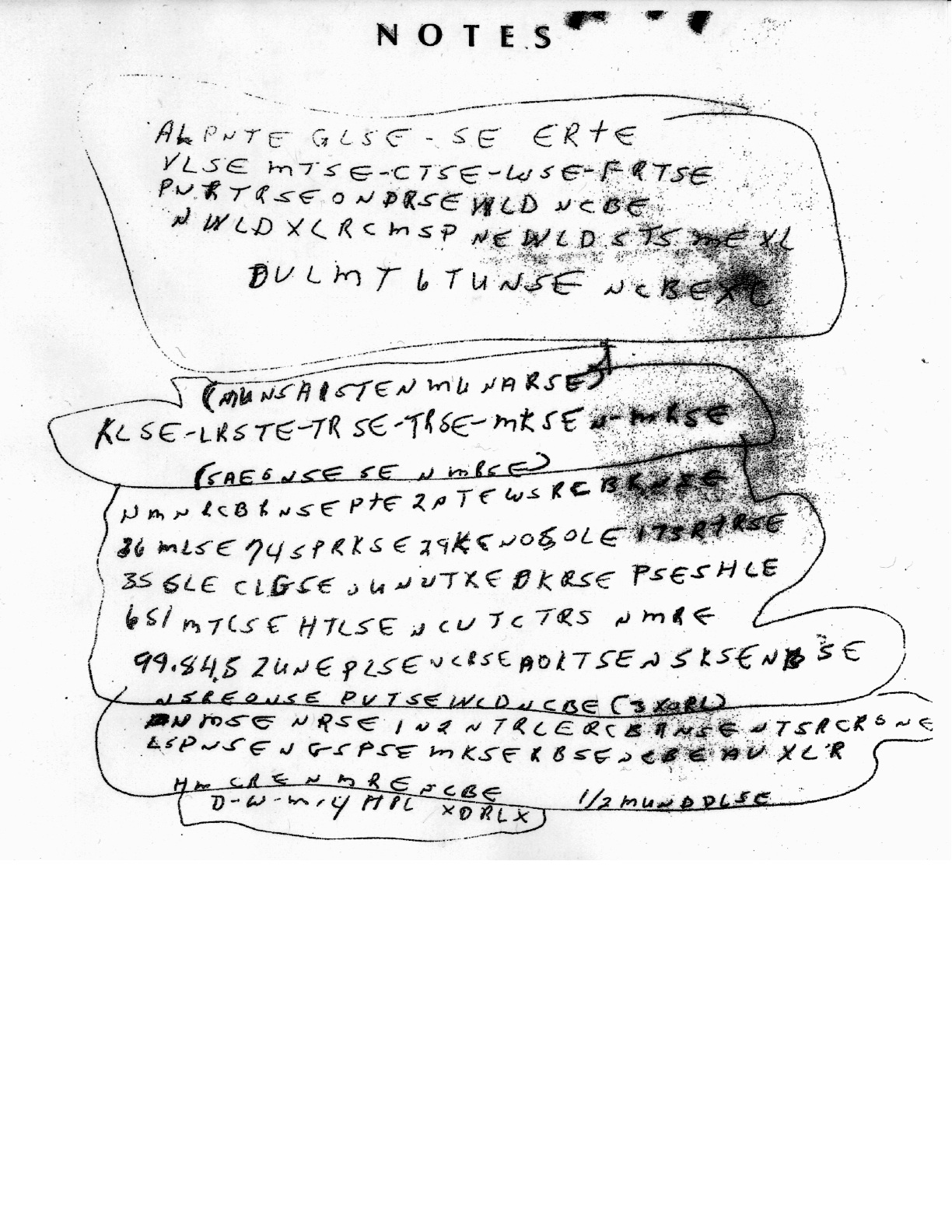
Note 2

The FBI has had so many responses with suggestions for the cipher that they later requested helpers to not call by phone nor use email. An FBI news release has stated, "This story has generated an outpouring of responses. To accommodate the continuing interest in this case, we have established a page where the public can offer their comments and theories about the coded messages."

== Response from McCormick family ==
Speaking in 2012 with the Riverfront Times, McCormick's family members said that "they never knew of Ricky to write in code. They say they only told investigators he sometimes jotted down nonsense he called writing, and they seriously question McCormick's capacity to craft the notes found in his pockets." His mother, Frankie Sparks, said "The only thing he could write was his name. He didn't write in no code." His cousin, Charles McCormick, said Ricky "couldn't spell anything, just scribble."

Moreover, when McCormick died, officials told his family about the other contents of the victim's pockets, but the family only found out about the notes when they were informed by a local news broadcast 12 years later.

== See also ==
- Isdal Woman
- List of ciphertexts
- List of unsolved murders (1980–1999)
- Tamam Shud case
- Zodiac Killer
