= Henry Debosnys =

U.S. American murderer

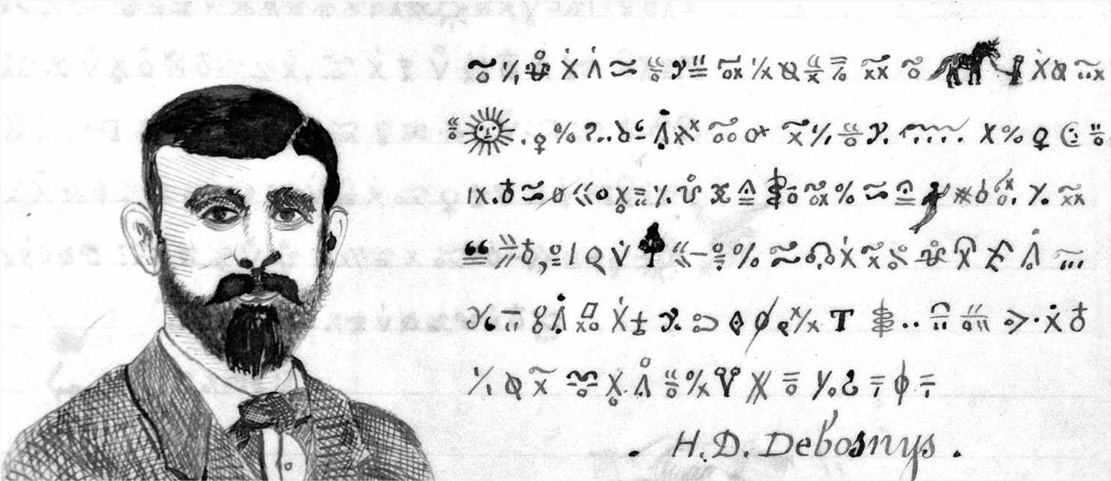
- A self-portrait of Debosnys with a pictogram.
- Born: Henry Delactnack Debosnys c. 1836; Lisbon, Portugal
- Died: April 27, 1883 (aged 46); Essex County, New York, U.S.
- Cause of death: Execution by hanging
- Spouse: Elizabeth Wells (m. 1882; d. 1882)
- Conviction: First degree murder
- Penalty: Death

Henry Delactnack Debosnys (c. 1836 – April 27, 1883) was a man who was hanged for murder of his third wife, Elizabeth Wells. His true background remains unknown. Debosnys had two previous wives who died under suspicious circumstances. During his incarceration in the Adirondack Mountains, he wrote poems, prose, and cryptograms in different languages. He left behind enciphered documents that have never been decrypted.

== Identity ==
Henry Debosnys was a mysterious figure whose true identity remains obscure. According to his autobiography, he was born in Lisbon, Portugal.

He divulged various details of his life story in different interviews and writings, but their veracity is doubtful. He made extravagant claims, such as participating in the North Pole Expedition under McClure from February 1848 to October 1850, and volunteering for several wars, such as the Crimean War, the Italian War of 1859 and the Franco-Prussian War.

Debosnys said he had been married twice before. His first wife was discovered drowned in a river in New York City. His second wife perished in Philadelphia of starvation. Both deaths aroused suspicion, but Debosnys evaded prosecution. He arrived in Essex on a yacht with a woman he claimed was another wife, but she disappeared shortly thereafter.

Debosnys professed to be an ornamental painter and had a talent for drawing. He was fluent in six languages. During his stay in Essex, he was regarded as a vagabond who idled around the area until compelled by hunger to undertake manual labor. He regularly received money from a local charity.

== Marriage in Essex ==
A few weeks after arriving in Essex, on June 8, 1882, he married Betsy Wells. She was a local widow with four daughters who owned a small farm in Essex, New York which she had inherited from her first husband, along with a sum of money.

He urged his wife to transfer the title of the land to him, but she declined, leading to frequent disputes between them. Betsy was eventually discovered murdered, with two bullet wounds in her skull and a deep cut across her neck.

== Arrest, incarceration and trial ==
He was arrested August 1, 1882 in Essex, New York after local farmers had seen him acting suspiciously in the woods and returned to the location later and found the body of Betsy Wells.

During his incarceration, he devoted much of his time to writing gloomy poems and prose, as well as cryptograms. Some of his writings were in languages other than English, such as French, Greek, Latin, Portuguese, and Spanish. He also attracted the attention and visits of many women who were fascinated by him. He received three trunks while at the jail, but only one of them was allowed to reach him. The other two contained weapons and ammunition and were seized by the authorities. The third trunk contained personal papers, cryptograms and poems. The origin and sender of the trunks remain unknown.

His trial began on March 6, 1883, took two days and the jury deliberated for eight minutes before returning a verdict of guilty of murder in the first degree.

He was hanged on April 27, 1883, the second and last person to be hanged in Essex County. The execution was watched by approximately 2000 people. Debosnys' last words, as reported by the hangman, were "I am innocent of the crime. You have made a mistake. The blood on my knife was the blood of a chipmunk." He had sold his body in advance to a local doctor for $15 and it was found to be covered in tattoos which were never specifically described. His skull and the noose he was hanged with are on display in the Adirondack History Center Museum in Elizabethtown, New York.

== Debosnys' ciphers ==
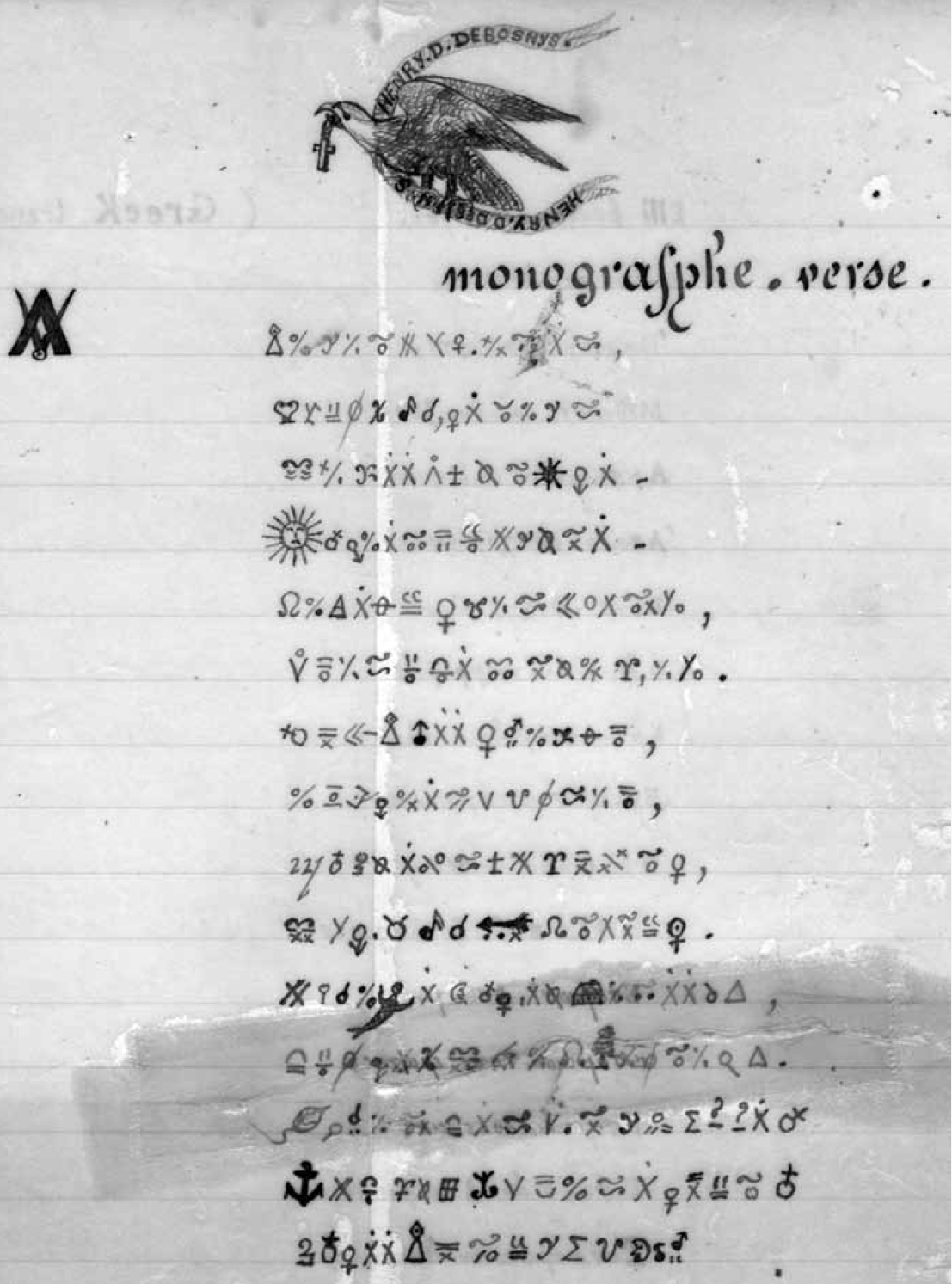
An enciphered poem

Debosnys left enciphered documents, that have never been decrypted, using a cryptographic script (or scripts) and/or pictograms. Henry entrusted most of his works to a female visitor during his incarceration. Her granddaughter later donated them to the Adirondack History Museum in Elizabethtown, where they are still preserved. Additional materials from other sources were acquired by the same museum as recently as 1991.

Among his manuscripts, one stands out as it is an encrypted poem. Every pair of lines ends with a same symbol (which is expected in a simple poem), suggesting a substitution cipher with polygraphic elements. Debosnys claimed that his cipher was widely used in Europe, and some resemblances have been noted between his writings and masonic ciphers, such as the Copiale cipher and the Folger Manuscript. On the reverse side of the paper containing the poem, a Greek translation is provided. However, the original language of the ciphertext is uncertain, as it could be English, French, Latin, Spanish, or Portuguese, all of which Debosnys was fluent in.
