= Copiale cipher =

Historical article manuscript

- Private collection
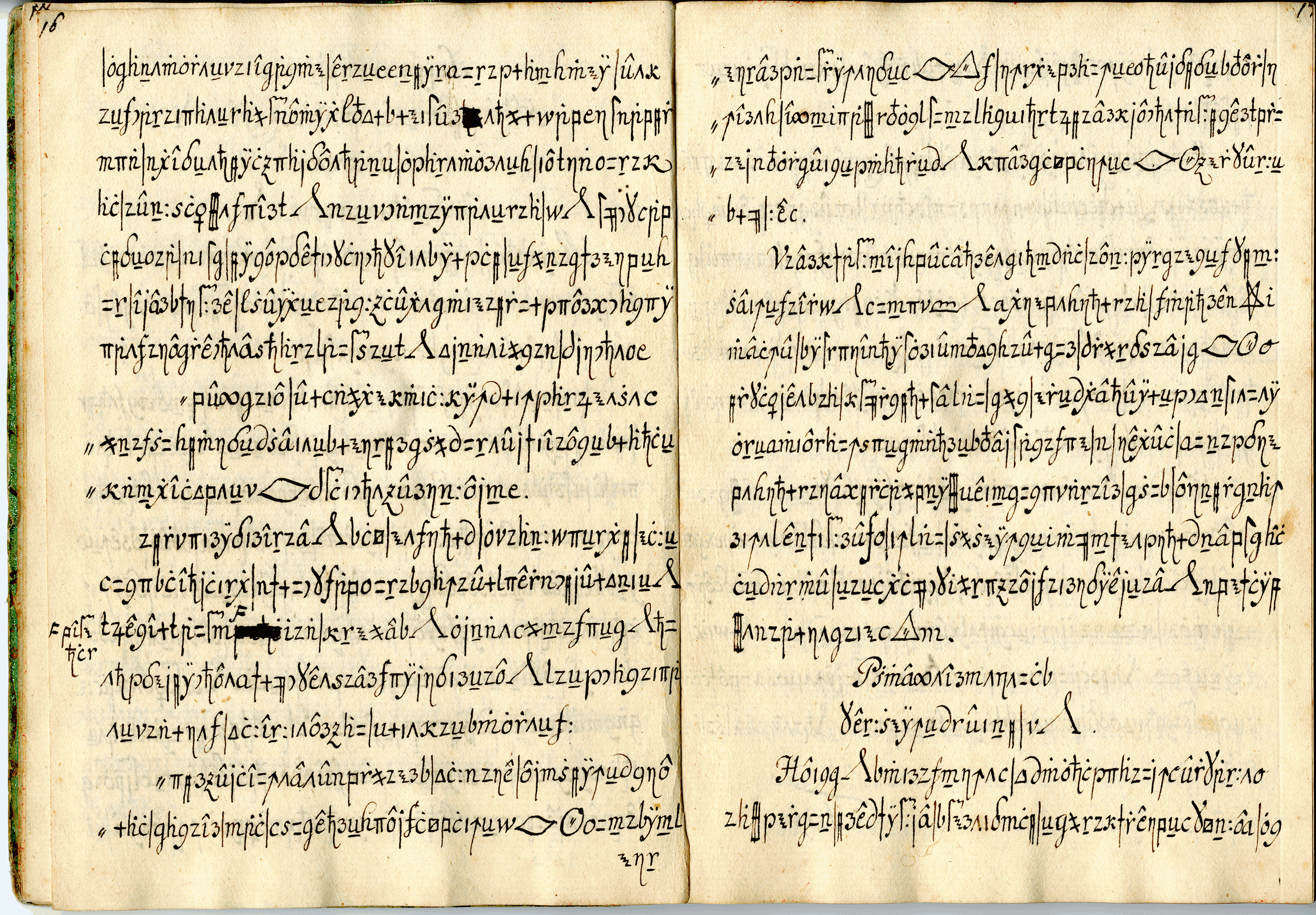
- Pages 16–17
- Type: Codex
- Date: 1730s
- Place of origin: Wolfenbüttel
- Language(s): German, encrypted in abstract symbols, Greek and Roman letters
- Author: Oculist secret society
- Size: 105 pages
- Contents: Oculist initiation ceremony
- Other: Deciphered in 2011

The Copiale cipher is an encrypted manuscript created in the 1700s and consisting of 75,000 handwritten characters filling 105 pages in a bound volume. Undeciphered for more than 260 years, the document was decrypted in 2011 with computer assistance. An international team consisting of Kevin Knight of the University of Southern California Information Sciences Institute and Viterbi School of Engineering, along with Beáta Megyesi and Christiane Schaefer of Uppsala University in Sweden, found the cipher to be an encrypted German text. The manuscript is a homophonic cipher that uses a complex substitution code, including symbols and letters, for its text and spaces.

Previously examined by scientists at the German Academy of Sciences at Berlin in the 1970s, the cipher was thought to date from between 1760 and 1780. Decipherment revealed that the document had been created in the 1730s by a secret society called the "high enlightened (Hocherleuchtete) oculist order" of Wolfenbüttel, or Oculists. The Oculists used sight as a metaphor for knowledge.

The manuscript is in a private collection. A parallel manuscript is kept at the Staatsarchiv Wolfenbüttel.

The Copiale cipher includes abstract symbols, as well as letters from Greek and most of the Roman alphabet. The only plain text in the book is "Copiales 3" at the end and "Philipp 1866" on the flyleaf. Philipp is thought to have been an owner of the manuscript. The plain text letters of the message were found to be encoded by accented Roman letters, Greek letters and symbols, with unaccented Roman letters serving only to represent spaces.

The researchers found that the initial 16 pages describe an Oculist initiation ceremony. The manuscript portrays, among other things, an initiation ritual in which the candidate is asked to read a blank piece of paper and, on confessing inability to do so, is given eyeglasses and asked to try again, and then again after washing the eyes with a cloth, followed by an "operation" in which a single eyebrow hair is plucked.

== Substitution cipher ==
The Copiale cipher is a substitution cipher. It is not a 1-for-1 substitution but rather a homophonic cipher: each ciphertext character stands for a particular plaintext character, but several ciphertext characters may encode the same plaintext character. For example, all the unaccented Roman characters encode a space. Seven ciphertext characters encode the single letter "e". In addition, some ciphertext characters stand for several characters or even a word. One ciphertext character ("†") encodes "sch", and another encodes the secret society's name.

== Decryption method ==
A machine translation expert, Knight approached language translation as if all languages were ciphers, effectively treating foreign words as symbols for English words. His approach, which tasked an expectation-maximization algorithm with generating every possible match of foreign and English words, enabled the algorithm to figure out a few words with each pass. A comparison with 80 languages confirmed that the original language was likely German, which the researchers had guessed based on the word "Philipp," a German spelling. Knight then used a combination of intuition and computing techniques to decipher most of the code in a few weeks. Megyesi later realized that a particular symbol meant "eye", and Schaefer connected that discovery to the Oculists.

== The Oculists ==
The Oculists were a group of ophthalmologists led by Count Friedrich August von Veltheim (father of August Ferdinand von Veltheim), who died in April 1775. The Philipp 1866 Copiales 3 document, however, appears to suggest that the Oculists, or at least Count Veltheim, were a group of Freemasons who created the Oculist society in order to pass along the Masonic rites which had recently been banned by Pope Clement XII.

== See also ==
- List of ciphertexts
- Voynich manuscript
