= The Unsolved =

1997 video game

- Platforms: Sega Saturn, PlayStation
- Release: JP: May 2, 1997
- Genre: Adventure

The Unsolved (Note: Japanese: ジ・アンソルブド, Hepburn: Ji Ansorubudo) is a 1997 adventure game released for the Sega Saturn and PlayStation. In the game, the player the role of a city detective Mac Callahan who must solve the bizarre murders of women in the area that may be linked to the existence of intelligent alien life on Earth.

== Development ==
The game is based off a story by Akio Aska. The game primarily uses still images of live-action material to tell its story.

== Release and reception ==
Reception

Review score
Publication	Score
Famitsu	9/10, 7/10, 6/10, 6/10 (SS); 9/10, 7/10, 6/10, 6/10 (PS)

The Unsolved was released in Japan for the Sega Saturn and PlayStation video game consoles on May 2, 1997. Both versions of the game are generally the same, with one writer in Famitsu commenting that the PlayStation version had higher quality images of the live-action material.

Reviewing the game in Famitsu, one writer complimented the game as great extension of Akio Aska's earlier work. Three reviewers commenting on the production quality of the live-action footage, with one reviewer saying the branching paths was a highlight. While one reviewer complimented the gameplay and deducing the mystery towards the end, they found the game generally too difficult and the various endings were unsatisfying.

German gaming magazine Fun Generation a Japanese import of the game, saying it was mostly just clicking through three CDs worth of beach photos and ultimately found the game to be unplayable.
