= D'Agapeyeff cipher =

Unbroken cipher

The D'Agapeyeff cipher is an unsolved cipher that appears in the first edition of Codes and Ciphers, an elementary book on cryptography published by the Russian-born English cryptographer and cartographer Alexander D'Agapeyeff in 1939.

Offered as a "challenge cipher" at the end of the book, the ciphertext is:

75628 28591 62916 48164 91748 58464 74748 28483 81638 18174
74826 26475 83828 49175 74658 37575 75936 36565 81638 17585
75756 46282 92857 46382 75748 38165 81848 56485 64858 56382
72628 36281 81728 16463 75828 16483 63828 58163 63630 47481
91918 46385 84656 48565 62946 26285 91859 17491 72756 46575
71658 36264 74818 28462 82649 18193 65626 48484 91838 57491
81657 27483 83858 28364 62726 26562 83759 27263 82827 27283
82858 47582 81837 28462 82837 58164 75748 58162 92000

It was not included in later editions, and D'Agapeyeff is said to have admitted later to having forgotten how he had encrypted it.

== Use of nulls in ciphertext ==
It is possible that not all the ciphertext characters are used in decryption and that some characters are nulls. Evidence for this is given by the author on p. 111 of the text under the sub-section heading Military Codes and Ciphers:

"The cipher is of course easily made out, but if every third, fourth, or fifth letter, as may be previously arranged, is a dummy inserted after a message has been put into cipher, it is then extremely difficult to decipher unless you are in the secret."

While the index of coincidence for the D'Agapeyeff cipher is 1.812 when taken in pairs horizontally (e.g., '75' '62' '82'), the letter frequency distribution is too flat for a 196 character message written in English.

Additionally, D'Agapeyeff left two ciphers for the reader to solve. Each are approximately 100 characters in length and have an index of coincidence much higher than what is expected for English plaintext.

== Use of Polybius square methods in Codes and Ciphers ==
The structure of the D'Agapeyeff Cipher has similarities to the Polybius square, which the author used as examples in his book. He explicitly solves an example of a Polybius square based cipher from a friend in his cryptanalysis section of the book. This worked example consisted of 178 characters:

CDDBC ECBCE BBEBD ABCCB BDBAB CCDCD BCDDE CAECB DDDAA CABCE
AABDE BCEDC BCCDA EBDCB AAEAB ECDDB DCCEC EEABD ADEAD CAADE
ACABD CBDCB AABDC ACEDC BABCD DCDBD DCBEB CDCBE BCAAB DACCD
DBBBC EAACD BDCDD BCEDC AECAC EDC

When deciphered with a Polybius square, the plaintext of this exercise contains a mistake (based on mis-encoding "E" as "BE" rather than "CE"), but reads:

"THE NEW PLAN OF ATTACK INCLUDES OPERATIONS BY THREE BOMBER SQUADRONS OVER FACTORY ARYA [AREA] SOUTHWEST OF THE RIVER"

	A	B	C	D	E
A	S	D	U	M	I/J
B	F	W	A	O	Y
C	V	N	*	T	E
D	L	H	R	C	Q
E	B	P	K	*	*
