= American Cryptogram Association =

American non-profit organization

- Formation: September 1, 1930; 96 years ago
- President: PHILLIES
- Website: www.cryptogram.org

The American Cryptogram Association (ACA) is an American non-profit organization devoted to the hobby of cryptography, with an emphasis on types of codes, ciphers, and cryptograms that can be solved either with pencil and paper, or with computers, but not computer-only systems.

== History ==
The ACA was formed on September 1, 1930. Initially the primary interest was in monoalphabetic substitution ciphers (also known as "single alphabet" or "Aristocrat" puzzles). This has since been extended to dozens of different systems, such as Playfair, autokey, transposition, and Vigenère ciphers.

Since some of its members had belonged to the “National Puzzlers' League”, some of the NPL terminology ("nom," "Krewe," etc.) is also used in the ACA.

== Publications and activities ==
The association has a collection of books and articles on cryptography and related subjects in the library at Kent State University.

An annual convention takes place in late August or early September. Recent conventions have been held in Bletchley Park and Fort Lauderdale, Florida.

There is also a regular journal called “The Cryptogram”, which first appeared in February, 1932, and has grown to a 28-page bimonthly periodical which includes articles and challenge ciphers.

== Notable members ==
- H. O. Yardley, who used the nom BOZO, first Vice President in 1933.
- Helen Fouché Gaines, member since 1933, who used the nom PICCOLA, editor of the 1939 book Elementary Cryptanalysis.
- Rosario Candela, who used the nom ISKANDER, member since June 1934.
- David Kahn, who used the noms DAKON, ISHCABIBEL and more recently Kahn D.
- Will Shortz, New York Times Puzzle Editor, who uses the nom WILLz.
- David Shulman, lexicographer and cryptographer, member since 1933, who used the nom Ab Struse.
- James Gillogly, who uses the nom SCRYER.
- Gelett Burgess, American artist, art critic, poet, author and humorist, used the nom TWO O'CLOCK.
