= Mrs. Wiggs of the Cabbage Patch (play) =

1903 play by Anne Crawford Flexner

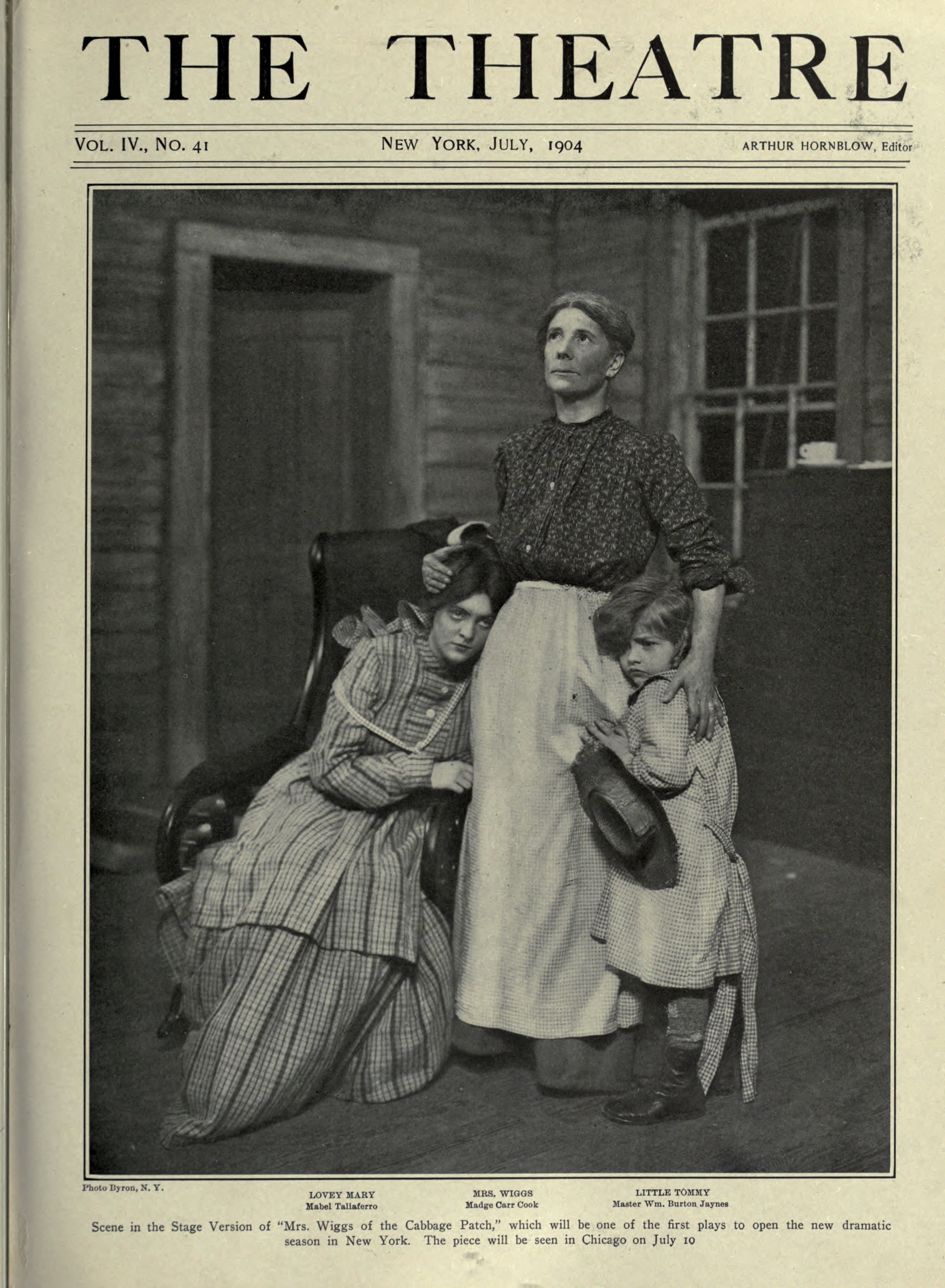
- Original language: English
- Written by: Anne Crawford Flexner
- Based on: Mrs. Wiggs of the Cabbage Patch (1901); Lovey Mary (1903) both by Alice Hegan Rice
- Music by: John Braham
- Subject: Rustic characters
- Genre: Comedy
- Setting: The "Cabbage Patch" neighborhood, Louisville, Kentucky

Premiere
- Date: September 27, 1904
- Place: Savoy Theatre
- Directed by: Oscar Eagle

Mrs. Wiggs of the Cabbage Patch, is a 1903 comedy by American author Anne Crawford Flexner. It was based on two books by Alice Hegan Rice, Mrs. Wiggs of the Cabbage Patch (1901) and Lovey Mary (1903). It has three acts and two settings, all within the "Cabbage Patch", an impoverished neighborhood on the fringes of Louisville, Kentucky. The character-driven play covers three weeks time and has multiple storylines, including an ill-starred mail-order marriage, two refugees from an orphanage, the return of a long-lost husband, and a handful of young romances.

The play was produced by Liebler & Company, with staging by Oscar Eagle, and sets by Gates and Morange. It starred Madge Carr Cook, Mabel Taliaferro, Helen Lowell, and William Hodge. It opened in Atlantic City in October 1903, went on to Louisville, Kentucky and other cities before having its Broadway premiere during September 1904.

After closing on Broadway in January 1905, Mrs. Wiggs of the Cabbage Patch went on an extensive tour, with additional companies performing in London and Australia. It had a brief Broadway revival from September through October 1906. The production was Liebler & Company's most successful play, eventually bringing in some $800,000 (Note: Roughly equivalent to $28 million in 2023.) after several years of touring.

== Characters ==
Principal speaking parts only, some feature roles, bit players, and livestock omitted.

Lead

- Mrs. Nancy Wiggs is about 50, a cheerful optimist, a good cook and gardener.
- Tabitha Hazy is Mrs. Wiggs' spinster neighbor; an indecisive pessimist, sour-faced, and a bad cook.
- Hiram Stubbins is in his late fifties, from Bagdad Junction, a mail-order groom, and a souse.
- Lovey Mary is about 18, a red-haired runaway orphan girl, devoted to Little Tommy.

Supporting

- Australia is Mrs. Wiggs' middle girl, called Austry, a contrarian and clumsy.
- Europena is Mrs. Wiggs' youngest girl, about 10, an opportunist.
- Asia is Mrs. Wiggs' oldest girl, about 16, who works in a nearby tile factory.
- Chris Hazy is Miss Hazy's nephew, about 17, a fiddle player with a wooden leg and joking manner.
- Miss Lucy is a wealthy single philanthropist. (Note: Based on the mother of Alice Hegan Rice.)
- Billy Wiggs is Mrs. Wiggs' surviving son, who has a kindling wood delivery service.
- Mrs. Eichorn is a tall, thin grouchy woman, who suspects Mary of being a "trollop".
- Mrs. Schultz is a fat German-American woman, also suspicious of Mary.
- Robert Redding called Mr. Bob, is a bachelor newspaper editor who has helped Billy and Asia.
- Ezra Wiggs is Mrs. Wiggs' long-lost husband, who went West to find work many years ago.

Featured

- Tommy is about 3, taken from the orphanage by Lovey Mary when she hears his "bad mother" is coming for him.
- H. Hunkerdunkus Jones is a spiritual adviser and matrimonial agent used by Stubbins and Miss Hazy.
- Deputy Sheriff tries to serve warrants on Lovey Mary and gets a taste of Cabbage Patch law in return.
- Deacon Bagby owns a grocery and performs the wedding service for Miss Hazy and Hiram Stubbins.
- Mr. Schultz is a German-American neighbor.
- Mr. Eichorn is a neighbor, and unlike his wife, friendly to Lovey Mary.

Off-stage

- Jim Wiggs was the older son of Mrs. Wiggs, who died from pneumonia trying to support the family.
- Cuby - Billy's white horse, whose name is actually Cuba. (Note: Despite never appearing on stage, the horse was listed in the play program by name followed by An Annexation. This latter was a topical allusion to the Spanish–American War, see Hegan, pp. 52-53.)

== Synopsis ==
This synopsis is based on the 1924 revision by Anne Crawford Flexner.

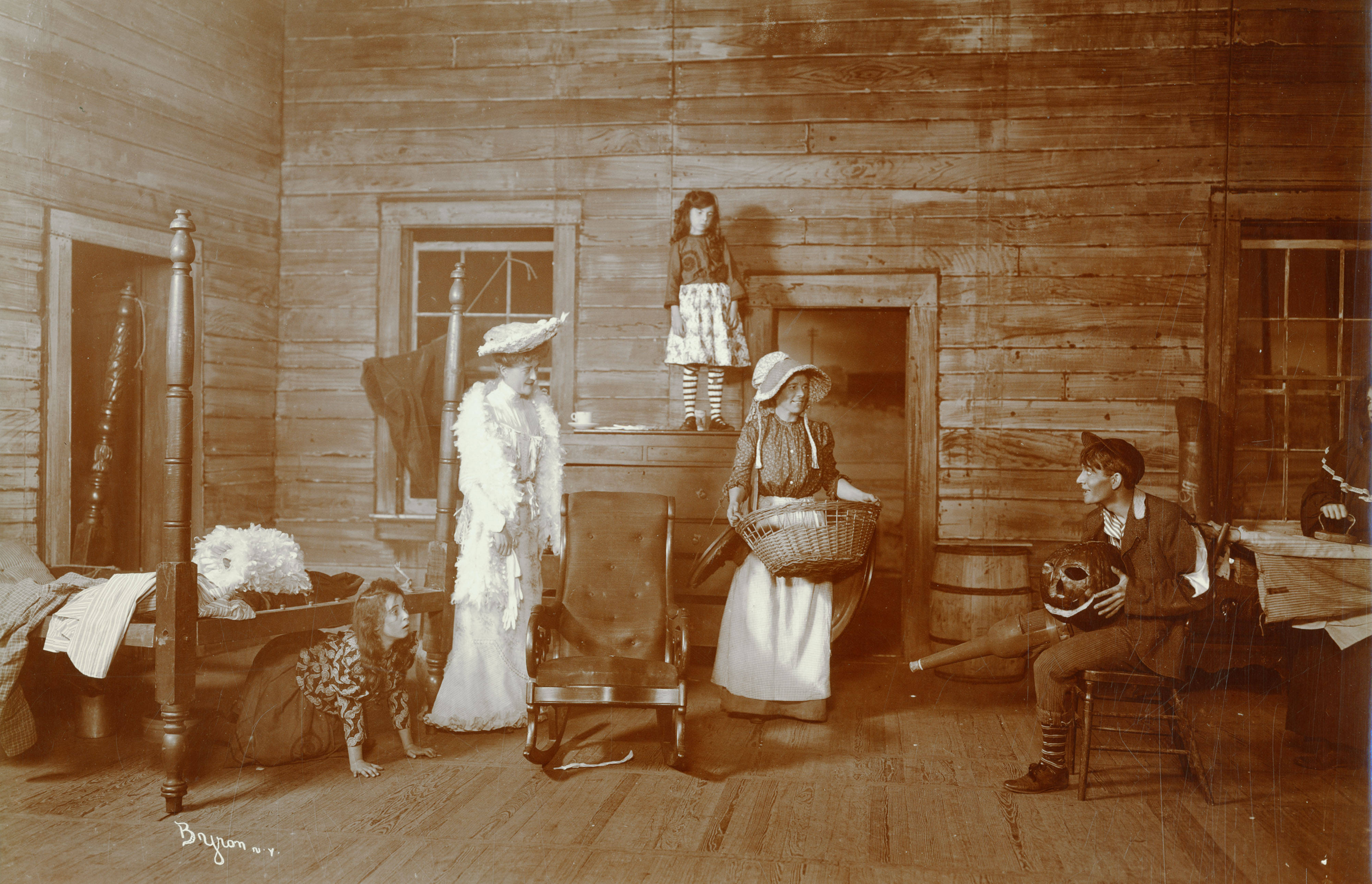

Act I (Kitchen of Mrs. Wiggs' cottage, a large open area that doubles as living room and sleeping quarters.) Mrs. Wiggs and her daughters are preparing for Miss Hazy's wedding to Mr. Stubbins, which will occur in the Wiggs' parlor. Miss Lucy stops by to show off her own engagement ring. Billy's horse Cuby is heard outside the window, but its really Chris Hazy imitating him. Deacon Bagby, Mr. Stubbins, and other neighbors come through the kitchen to the parlor. A wagon is heard stopping outside, and Billy ushers Lovey Mary and Tommy inside. He had picked them up as they wandered looking for a place to stay. Mrs. Wiggs serves them food and allots sleeping places. Everyone but Mary goes into the parlor for the ceremony. While Mary sits alone in the kitchen, a man enters. It is Ezra Wiggs, who is unaware his family now lives here. Ezra asks Mary if she's seen a strange girl and baby. She says no, and he departs. The ceremony over, the guests pour out into the kitchen to eat and dance. (Curtain)

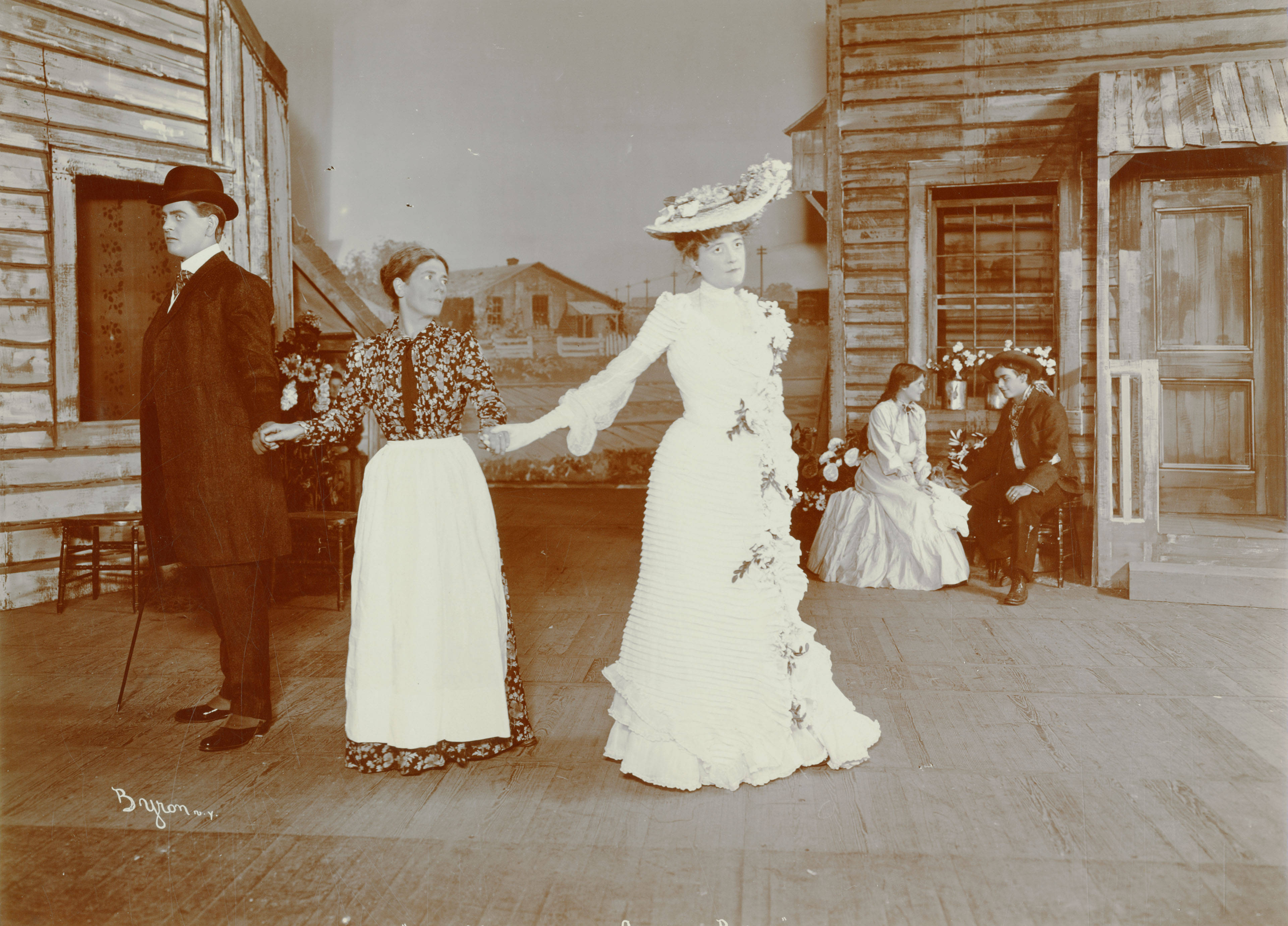

Act II (Exterior of Mrs. Wiggs' cottage. Miss Hazy's house is next door, and the railroad tracks behind. Sunday afternoon, a week later.) Miss Hazy and Stubbins argue over her cooking. He is unaware that Mrs. Wiggs supplied the food that Miss Hazy gave him before the wedding. He starts into town to visit some GAR friends but encounters Mr. Bob. Stubbins shows him an ad from his newspaper offering a reward for information on Mary and Tommy. Mr. Bob says the ad is legitimate. Mrs. Wiggs returns from taking flowers to the Children's Hospital. Asia and Chris have a spat about her going riding on Billy's wagon with another boy. Mary is surprised when Billy asks her to join them on the ride. Mrs. Wiggs presides over a Sunday School of local children. Mrs. Eichorn and Mrs. Schultz argue with Mary about her singing for the church vaudeville show. Chris and Asia make up and are caught kissing by Miss Lucy. Miss Lucy confesses to Mrs. Wiggs about her own trouble with Mr. Bob. Mr. Stubbins is seen staggering along. He drunkenly berates Miss Hazy and Mrs. Wiggs for deceiving him then passes out. Mr. Wiggs and the Deputy Sheriff come by with a warrant for Mary. But when Ezra Wiggs sees Mrs. Wiggs, he tears up the warrant, and they leave without the refugees. Stubbins has become a liability, so Mrs. Wiggs, Billy, and Mary load him into an empty west-bound freight car, (Note: Reviews indicate the rail car did appear on stage from behind Mrs. Wiggs house.) with some of Mrs. Wiggs' pies beside him. (Curtain)

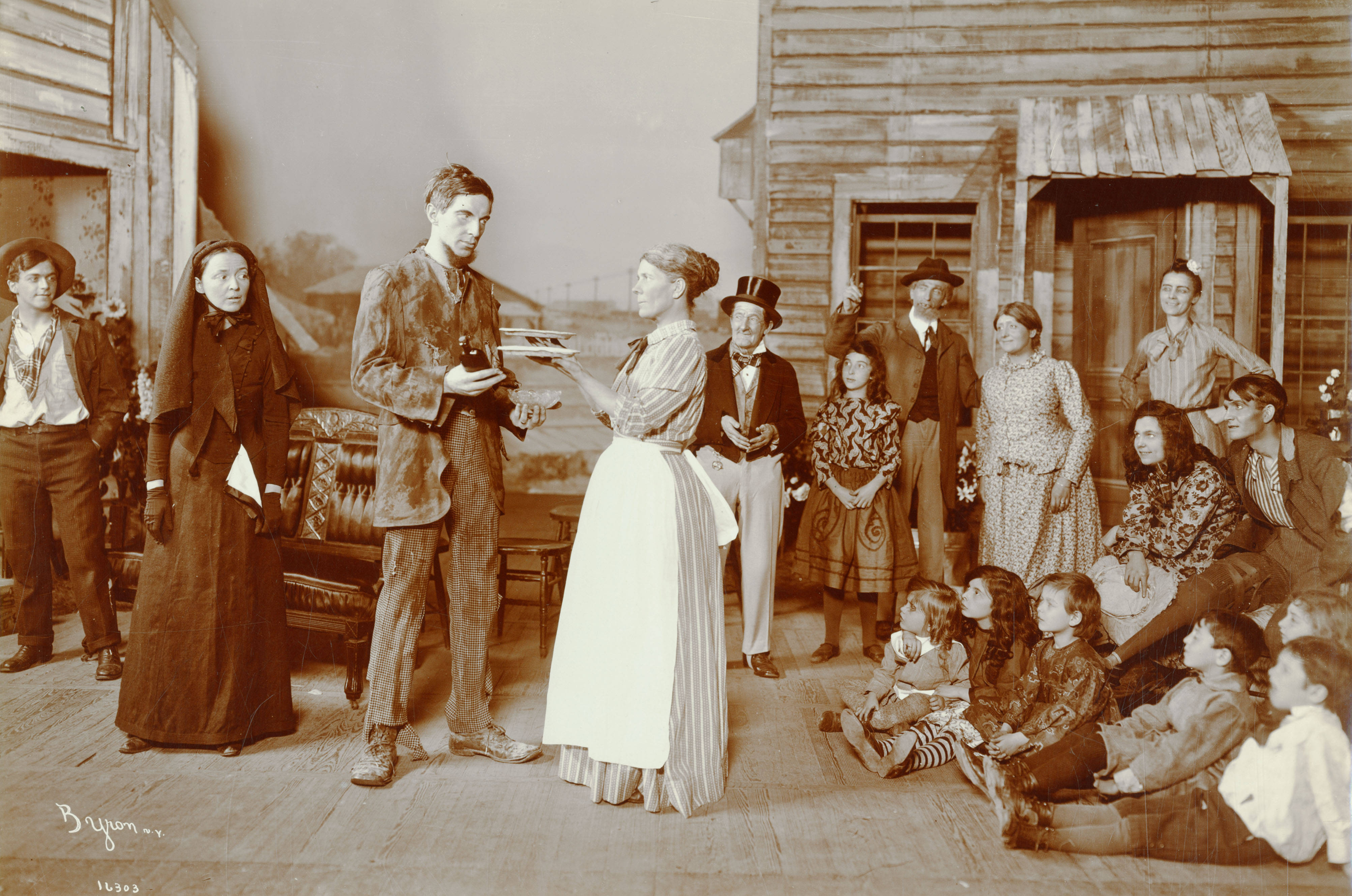

Act III (Same as Act II, but with a platform built in front of Miss Hazy's house. It is evening, several days later.) Mrs. Wiggs tells Mary she is worried by Mr. Wiggs going off again for three days. An envelope arrives for Hiram Stubbins at Miss Hazy's house. Mr. Jones comes by looking for the money Stubbins owes him for the marriage, but leaves unpaid. Alone together on the front porch, Billy tells Mary he loves her. Soon neighbors arrive for the church benefit show. Miss Hazy asks Mrs. Wiggs to open the envelope for Stubbins, fearing another unpaid bill, but it contains a letter authorizing his Union Army pension and a check for $800 in arrears. The women are astonished and regret shipping Stubbins off so soon. Mr. Bob and Miss Lucy arrive by auto; (Note: The auto, unlike the horse Cuby, actually does appear on stage.) they are now Mr. and Mrs. Redding, on their way to Niagara Falls. Next Stubbins appears, having walked back to the Cabbage Patch, propelled by the memory of Mrs. Wiggs' pies. He and Miss Hazy reconcile, while the others prepare to hear Lovey Mary sing. The Deputy Sheriff returns with another warrant. Ezra and Stubbins try to stop him, but the Deputy lays hold of Mary and is soundly beaten and driven off by the Cabbage Patch residents. Ezra apologises to Mrs. Wiggs over his long absence, and admires her for raising the family alone. She tells him that Jim helped her, but three years ago... Feeling ashamed, Ezra won't enter the house until Mrs. Wiggs calls him inside. (Curtain)

== Original production ==
=== Background ===
Liebler & Company was a partnership between investor Theodore A. Liebler and producer-manager George C. Tyler. They had successfully produced stage adaptations of two novels by English authors, The Christian and Children of the Ghetto, and were on the lookout for another. Tyler traveled to England hoping to secure some of J. M. Barrie's work, only to find he was tied up contractually by Charles Frohman. Barrie suggested Tyler consider works by William Allen White or Alice Hegan Rice. He lent Tyler his own copy of the latter's Mrs. Wiggs of the Cabbage Patch. Tyler read the book overnight and the next day cabled America to secure the dramatic rights.

Alice Hegan Rice suggested to Liebler & Company that Anne Crawford Flexner do the stage adaptation. The character of Mrs. Wiggs was based on Mrs. Mary A. Bass, a resident of the Cabbage Patch neighborhood. By the time the play started being performed, she had been inundated with visitors, helped by newspaper articles that printed her address.

Oscar Eagle was credited for stage management in contemporary reviews. At that time it might still encompass the creative role of director with the traffic control of individual performances it now entails. Incidental music for the play was composed by John Braham. According to Tyler's memoirs, the third act as written wasn't working. He consulted an old playwright named George Hoey who suggested having Mrs. Wiggs place some pies in the train box car with Stubbins at the second act's end. These entice him back to the Cabbage Patch to bolster the comedy in the third act.

=== Cast ===
Principal cast for the opening seasons and during the original Broadway run. The production was on hiatus from May 29 through July 9, 1904.
Role	Actor	Dates	Notes and sources
Mrs. Wiggs	Madge Carr Cook	Oct 01, 1903 - Jan 07, 1905	
Lovey Mary	Mabel Taliaferro	Oct 01, 1903 - Jan 07, 1905	
Miss Hazy	Helen Lowell	Oct 01, 1903 - Jan 07, 1905	The Dixon Evening Telegraph made much of Lowell turning herself into a dowdy, sour-faced spinster.
Mr. Stubbins	William Hodge	Oct 01, 1903 - Jan 07, 1905	
Miss Lucy	Beth Franklyn	Oct 01, 1903 - May 28, 1904	
Miss Lucy	Nora Shelby	Jul 10, 1904 - Jan 07, 1905	
Mrs. Eichorn	Lillian Lee	Oct 01, 1903 - Jan 07, 1905	Lee was hailed by The Daily Argus for making herself appear plain and unappealing for the role.
Mrs. Schultz	Anna Fields	Oct 01, 1903 - Jan 07, 1905	
Asia	May McManus	Oct 01, 1903 - Jan 07, 1905	
Australia	Edith Storey	Oct 01, 1903 - May 28, 1904	
Australia	Edith Taliaferro	Jul 10, 1904 - Aug 06, 1904	She had been signed at age 10 by Liebler & Co. for $100 a week.
Australia	Edith Storey	Aug 08, 1904 - Jan 07, 1905	Storey returned as Taliaferro was to appear with Ezra Kendall in Weatherbeaten Benson.
Europena	Sylvia Cashin	Oct 01, 1903 - May 28, 1904	
Europena	Bessie Burt	Jul 10, 1904 - Jan 07, 1905	
Mr. Bob	Thurston Hall	Oct 01, 1903 - Jan 07, 1905	
Billy Wiggs	Argyle Campbell	Oct 01, 1903 - Jan 07, 1905	
Chris Hazy	Taylor Granville	Oct 01, 1903 - Jan 07, 1905	Granville was twice the age of his character. He wore a wooden "peg leg" on stage.
Mr. Wiggs	Oscar Eagle	Oct 01, 1903 - Jan 07, 1905	
Tommy	William Burton Janes	Oct 01, 1903 - Jan 07, 1905	Janes was also much older than his character, being about 7 when the production started.
H. H. Jones / Deputy Sheriff	Edwin S. Phillips	Oct 01, 1903 - May 28, 1904	
H. H. Jones / Deputy Sheriff	Ed. W. Gillespie	Jul 10, 1904 - Jan 07, 1905	
Deacon Bagby	A. W. Maflin	Oct 01, 1903 - Jan 07, 1905	
Mr. Schultz	Arns Steinberg	Oct 01, 1903 - May 28, 1904	
Mr. Schultz	Harry L. Franklin	Jul 10, 1904 - Jan 07, 1905	
Mr. Eichorn	William Sherlock	Oct 01, 1903 - Jan 07, 1905	

=== Opening seasons ===
Mrs. Wiggs of the Cabbage Patch opened at Young's Pier Theatre in Atlantic City on October 1, 1903. After three days it went to Macauley's Theatre in Louisville, Kentucky, where both Alice Hegan Rice and Anne Crawford Flexner were in attendance on opening night. After a week, the production went to St. Louis, toured through the Upper Midwest and the Mid-Atlantic, spent seven weeks at the Park Theatre in Boston, then did the New England circuit finishing its first season at the Meriden Theatre in Meriden, Connecticut on May 28, 1904.

Critical reception was positive the opening season until the play hit Boston. One objection was to Edwin S. Phillips' Deputy Sheriff, whose "alleged Southern accent" was not well received in Louisville. But the same critic recognized the difficulty the playwright had in constructing a drama from the episodic sketches of the two books, and praised her choice of expanding the Hazy-Stubbins storyline to give a central plot to the production. At Boston, the production received a dismal notice from Edward H. Crosby of The Boston Post. Crosby thought the play "at best but a string of episodes" but "even this might have been covered up were the people in the cast competent to carry out the work assigned to them". He considered Helen Lowell's Miss Hazy as "terribly overdrawn" and William Hodge's Mr. Stubbins "overplayed", "grotesque", and "the greatest disappointment". Even Mabel Taliaferro came in for criticism, though Crosby tempered it by saying "the part was badly written". His review was in marked contrast to those in The Boston Evening Transcript and The Boston Globe, which praised the writing and acting.

After a six-week hiatus, the production opened its second season at the Grand Opera House in Chicago, on July 10, 1904. The reviewer for the Chicago Tribune said that with the current cast Mrs. Wiggs of the Cabbage Patch was "humanly interesting" but with lesser performers would quickly fall to "character or rather, caricature melodrama". After two weeks at the Grand Opera House, people were still being turned away every night from the sold-out performances. The play's run was booked for seven weeks, after which it went to Atlantic City for three nights then to Manhattan for its Broadway premiere.

=== Premiere and reception ===
The play had its Broadway premiere at the Savoy Theatre on September 3, 1904; The Brooklyn Citizen noted "this is one of the few plays coming to New York for the first time after a successful season on the road". The New York Tribune reviewer said five hundred thousand copies of Rice's first book had already been sold making a sure audience for the drama, but "even with both books to work on it was hard to get enough of a story to make a drama". The critic for The Brooklyn Daily Eagle was most impressed with the "character acting" of Helen Lowell and William Hodge overall, and with Madge Carr Cook in the later acts. The Evening World reviewer called it "The Vegetable Play", dismissed the plot as unimportant and reported the audience was "intensely amused" with the "quaint and drolly" work.

Brooklyn Life noted the play, while "thoroughly enjoyable", didn't ring as true as the original stories: "occasionally the characters run dangerously near the line of burlesque". The reviewer singled out Nora Shelby for opprobrium, calling her Miss Lucy "a libel on the original", presumably a reference to Beth Franklyn who had the role in the first season. The New York Times review called it a "sub-rural melodrama" and said it was "conventionally amusing".

=== Closing ===
The Broadway run of Mrs. Wiggs of the Cabbage Patch closed after 150 performances at the Savoy Theatre on January 7, 1905. The production then started touring again, beginning at New Rochelle, New York, but without lead Mabel Taliaferro, who stayed in Manhattan for the role of Dolly in George Bernard Shaw's You Never Can Tell. Her place on the tour was taken by her cousin, Bessie Barriscale.

== Bibliography ==
- Alice Caldwell Hegan. Mrs. Wiggs of the Cabbage Patch. The Century Company, 1901.
- Alice Hegan Rice. Lovey Mary. The Century Company, 1903.
- Anne Crawford Flexner. Mrs. Wiggs of the Cabbage Patch. Samuel French, 1924.
- George C. Tyler and J. C. Furnas. Whatever Goes Up. Bobbs Merrill, 1934.
