= Mrs. Wiggs of the Cabbage Patch =

1901 novel by Alice Caldwell Hegan

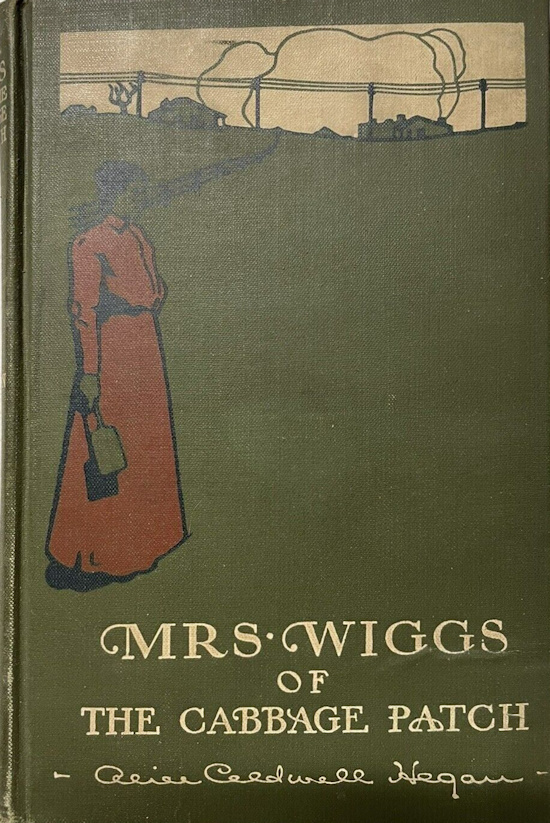
- 1902 Edition
- Author: Alice Hegan Rice
- Cover artist: Florence Scovel Shinn
- Language: English
- Genre: Fiction - Humorous sentiment
- Publisher: The Century Company
- Publication date: 1901 (US)
- Publication place: United States
- Media type: Print
- Pages: 153

Mrs. Wiggs of the Cabbage Patch is a 1901 novel by American author Alice Hegan Rice, about a southern family humorously coping with poverty. It was highly popular on its release, and has been adapted to film several times. The early editions of the book carry the author's birth name, Alice Caldwell Hegan.

Rice was inspired to write the book during her "philanthropic work in a Louisville, Kentucky slum area, where she met an optimistic and cheerful woman" who was a model for the book's main character.

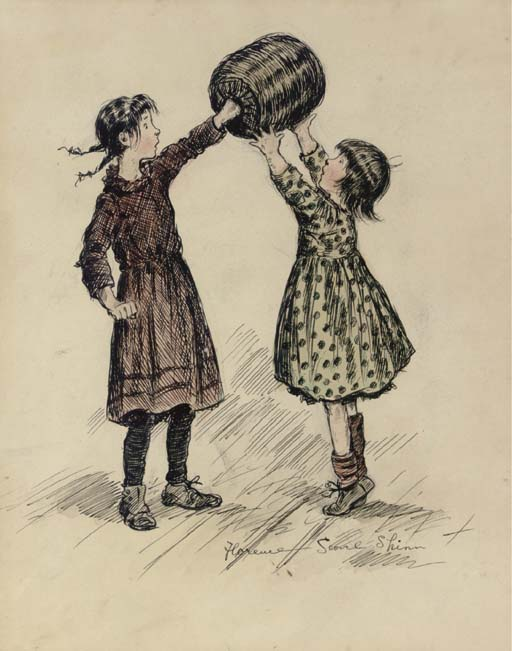

The book is set in a white turn-of-the-century urban slum, with two somewhat wealthy individuals wanting to help the inhabitants. The title character is a widow with three daughters — whom she named after the continents, thinking that geographical names were refined — and two sons, the eldest of whom dies before the middle of the book.

As of 1997, the book had sold more than 650,000 copies in a hundred printings.

Lovey Mary, a sequel by Rice, was published in 1903 and features many of the first book's characters.

== Adaptations ==
=== Play ===
In 1903, the book was combined with Lovey Mary for a play which premiered on Broadway at the Savoy Theatre in September 1904. It was written by Anne Crawford Flexner, and starred Madge Carr Cook. It had been performed in October 1903 in Louisville, Kentucky. Helen Lowell who appeared in the cast was able to tour to Australia, New Zealand, Hawaii and across America for the next seven years playing Miss Hazy "in the Cabbage Patch".

=== Film ===
- Mrs. Wiggs of the Cabbage Patch (1914 film), a 1914 silent film starring Blanche Chapman
- Mrs. Wiggs of the Cabbage Patch (1919 film), a 1919 silent film starring Marguerite Clark and Mary Carr
- Mrs. Wiggs of the Cabbage Patch (1934 film), a 1934 film released by Paramount Pictures starring Pauline Lord
- Mrs. Wiggs of the Cabbage Patch (1942 film), a 1942 film also released by Paramount Pictures starring Fay Bainter

=== Radio ===
The book was also adapted into a radio series which aired from 1935 to 1938.
