= Lovey Mary (book) =

1903 novel by Alice Hegan Rice

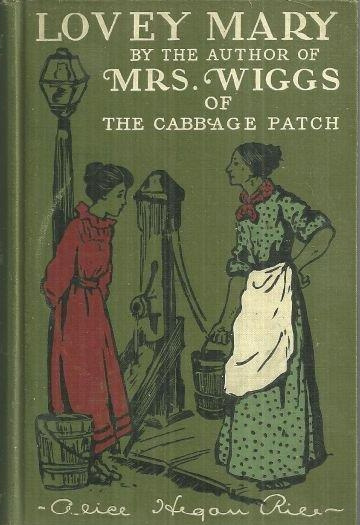
- First Edition 1903
- Author: Alice Hegan Rice
- Cover artist: Florence Scovel Shinn
- Language: English
- Genre: Fiction - Humorous sentiment
- Publisher: The Century Company
- Publication date: Feb 1903 (US)
- Publication place: United States
- Media type: Print
- Pages: 197

Lovey Mary is a 1903 novel by the American writer Alice Hegan Rice. The novel was first serialized in the monthly Century Magazine beginning in December 1902, then was published in book form by The Century Company on February 28, 1903. It was a sequel to the author's 1901 novel Mrs. Wiggs of the Cabbage Patch. The book contains eighteen illustrations by Florence Scovel Shinn, one of which is reproduced on the cover. The story spans three years in the life of Lovey Mary, an orphan who finds acceptance among the poor folks of the Cabbage Patch, an area which was inspired by Rice's personal experiences growing up in Kentucky.

While not as successful as Mrs. Wiggs of the Cabbage Patch, Rice's 1903 novel was well-enough received to be dramatized later that year and adapted into a film in 1926.

== Characters ==
Major

- Lovey Mary is an orphan, who takes care of Tommy at the orphanage then absconds with him.
- Miss Bell is the prim, humorless, but fair-minded matron of the orphanage.
- Kate Rider is a fast older girl who taunted Lovey Mary at the orphanage but left in disgrace.
- Tommy is the infant son of Kate Rider, whose mother leaves him at the orphanage.
- Miss Hazy is a spinster resident of the impoverished Cabbage Path neighborhood.
- Mrs. Wiggs is Miss Hazy's next door neighbor, a kind, cheerful woman with four kids.
- Asia Minor Wiggs is Mrs. Wiggs' oldest daughter, who works in a factory as a skilled artist.
- Chris Hazy is Miss Hazy's live-in nephew, a wild teenager who has a peg-leg.
- Billy Wiggs is Mrs. Wiggs' oldest child, who runs a delivery service using his horse Cuba.
- Jake Schultz is a teenaged friend of Billy and Chris.
- Miss Viney is an elderly herb-woman who grows a "Denominational Garden" in the countryside.

Minor

- Susie Smithers is a young orphan girl who educates herself by peering through keyholes.
- Europena Wiggs is Mrs. Wiggs' youngest child.
- Australia Wiggs is Mrs. Wiggs' middle daughter.
- Mrs. Eichorn is a large woman who lives in the Cabbage Patch.
- Mrs. Schultz is a fat invalid, a resident of the Cabbage Patch.
- Robert Redding, called "Mr. Bob", is a newspaper editor, and Billy's patron.
- Mrs. Robert Redding is a kind-hearted wealthy lady who gives Asia Wiggs her cast-off dresses.
- Robert Redding, Jr is the infant son of "Mr. Bob" and Mrs. Redding, whom Lovey Mary saves from choking.
- Mr. Stubbins is a scarecrow suitor for Miss Hazy, a mean drunk who is off-loaded onto a freight car.
- Mr. Rothchild is a mean neighbor of Mrs. Wiggs who reveals a tender side.

== Plot summary ==
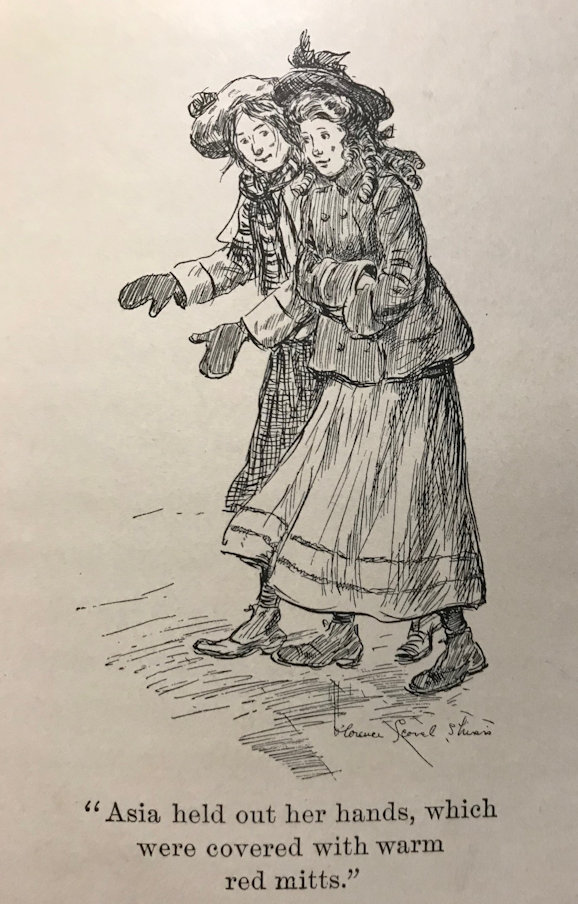

Lovey Mary is a thirteen-year-old orphan living at an asylum run by Miss Bell. Despite her youth, she has responsibility for fourteen younger children: getting them washed and dressed, and seeing their beds are made. One day a former inmate, Kate Rider, brings her year-old boy to Miss Bell for raising. Lovey Mary dislikes Kate, who always taunted her for being plain and without "curves". Nevertheless, she bonds with young Tommy when Miss Bell gives him into her sole charge. For the next two years Lovey Mary raises Tommy in the orphanage, helping him learn to talk and walk, and becoming his surrogate mother. But when Kate Rider returns to claim him, Lovey Mary slips away with Tommy, eventually winding up in the Cabbage Patch, a rundown neighborhood on the fringes of Louisville.

There she asks the indecisive Miss Hazy for work, who appeals to Mrs. Wiggs for help. Mrs. Wiggs hasn't room for Mary and Tommy, but convinces Miss Hazy to take them into her house. Mary proves a resourceful boarder, cleaning and tidying the messes left behind by Miss Hazy and her nephew Chris. Asia Wiggs gives Mary a hand-me-down red dress from Mrs. Redding, to replace the bleak gingham she wore at the orphanage. She also gets Mary a job at the factory where she works. Mary earns $3 a week sorting and packing tiles all day, enabling her to pay Miss Hazy for the room and Mrs. Wiggs for meals.

During the next year Mary gradually sheds the defensive attitude she brought into the Patch, that had caused Mrs. Wiggs to label her "a repeatin' rifle". She helps Billy, Chris, and Mrs. Wiggs to load Mr. Stubbins, Miss Hazy's drunken husband of one week, into a west-bound freight car after he slaps Tommy. She picnics with the Wiggs children, Jack, and Chris during the summer. She meets Miss Viney, whose Denominational Garden holds the key to understanding the "canker-worm of Hate" that she harbors within herself. During the winter holidays, Jack Shultz, who works at the Opera House, proposes the Patch kids put on a play, but the only available scripts are for Faust. With Billy as Faust, and Jack as Mephistopheles, Mary takes the role of Marguerite, astonishing everyone with her poise and singing. Shyly, she asks Mrs. Wiggs to give Billy the Christmas present she bought for him, a red necktie. Later that winter, when she and Asia visit Mrs. Redding, Mary saves the young Robert Redding from choking.

Mary finds her sympathies aroused upon hearing Kate Rider is in the hospital, having been injured by a streetcar. Kate is feverish, broke and alone, her head injury incurable. The hospital provides an ambulance wagon to carry Kate to Miss Hazy's house, where Mary puts her into her own bed. For the last several weeks of Kate's life Mary works extra shifts at the factory to pay for her care, until at last Kate passes away holding Tommy in her arms. Mary and Tommy then return to the orphanage, only to find Miss Bell knew all along where they were. Mary becomes Miss Bell's assistant, until Mr. and Mrs. Redding ask her and Tommy to join them on a trip to Niagara Falls and Canada. As the train they are taking pauses at the water tank in the Cabbage Patch, Mrs Wiggs hands Mary an empty jug to fill with Niagara water. Her last sight of the Patch is Billy, wearing his red necktie, blowing kisses to her.

== Reception ==
The New York Times Saturday Review of Books expressed "our liking for this little work of Alice Hegan Rice, for its comprehension of child life, its sympathy with the humble... and its delightful humor". The Brooklyn Times said that "Lovey Mary is destined to a wide popularity", while The Brooklyn Daily Eagle thought the author "has repeated her success with Mrs. Wiggs of the Cabbage Patch in her new book". Five months after its first publication, the New-York Tribune reported Lovey Mary as fifth on its weekly best sellers list.

== Adaptations ==
=== Stage ===
Liebler & Company bought the dramatic rights for both Mrs. Wiggs of the Cabbage Patch and Lovey Mary, and at the suggestion of Alice Hegan Rice, commissioned her friend Anne Crawford Flexner to combine them into a stage play. The play used the first book's title when it opened in Atlantic City on October 1, 1903. Its Broadway premiere occurred in September 1904. It was financially the most successful play Liebler & Company ever produced, earning some $800,000 (Note: Roughly equivalent to $28 million in 2023.) after several years of touring.

=== Film ===
Lovey Mary was adapted into a Metro-Goldwyn-Mayer Pictures film in 1926, directed by King Baggot and starring Bessie Love as Lovey Mary. Only 6 of the 7 original reels of film for this adaptation survive until today, and these exist in the MGM preservation.

== Bibliography ==
- Alice Hegan Rice. Lovey Mary. The Century Company, 1903.
- George C. Tyler and J. C. Furnas. Whatever Goes Up. Bobbs Merrill, 1934.
