= Mrs. Wiggs of the Cabbage Patch (1919 film) =

1919 film by Hugh Ford

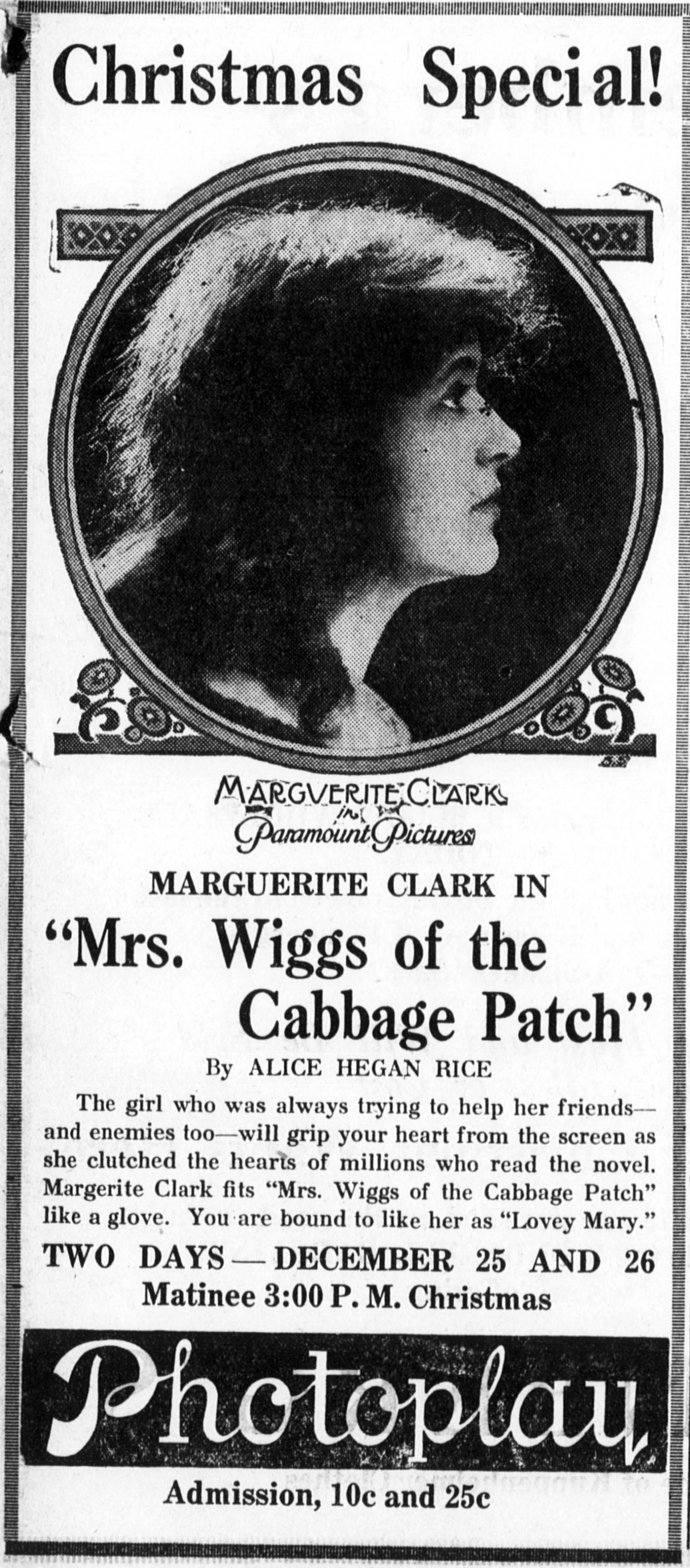
- Newspaper advertisement.
- Directed by: Hugh Ford
- Written by: Eve Unsell (scenario)
- Based on: Mrs. Wiggs of the Cabbage Patch by Alice Hegan Rice play by Anne Crawford Flexner
- Starring: Marguerite Clark; Mary Carr
- Cinematography: William Marshall
- Production company: Famous Players–Lasky Corporation
- Distributed by: Paramount Pictures
- Release date: February 16, 1919 (United States)
- Running time: 50 minutes
- Country: United States
- Language: Silent (English intertitles)

Mrs. Wiggs of the Cabbage Patch is a 1919 American silent comedy-drama film produced by Famous Players–Lasky Corporation and distributed through Paramount Pictures. Directed by Hugh Ford, the film stars Marguerite Clark and is based on the 1904 Broadway play by Anne Crawford Flexner, which itself is taken from the novel of the same name by Alice Hegan Rice.

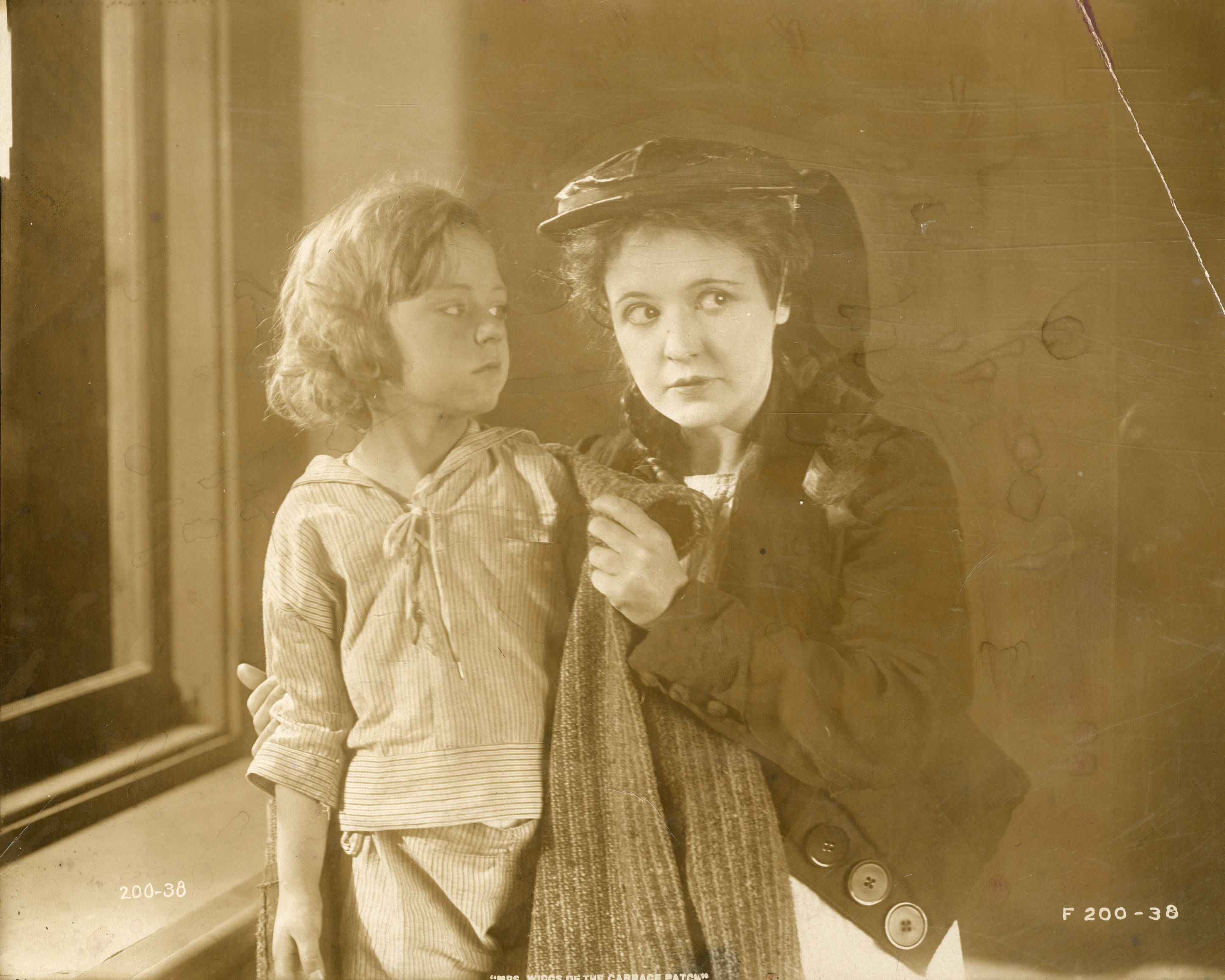
unknown child player and Marguerite Clark.

The picture survives and is preserved at the Library of Congress, one of Clark's few surviving silent films.

== Plot ==
As described in a film magazine, Lovey Mary is an inmate of an orphanage who runs away with a little boy with whom she has become strongly attached. She finds refuge on a rainy night with Mrs. Wiggs, a mother of five who lives in a wretched settlement known as the Cabbage Patch. Mrs. Wiggs feeds and shelters them, and lies to a sheriff looking to return them to the orphanage. There are a series of interactions with the amusing characters that live in the Cabbage Patch with brings about the growth and improvement in Mary. It is through Mary that the child she has been mothering becomes legitimate and the whole family obtains prosperity.

== Cast ==
- Marguerite Clark as Lovey Mary
- Mary Carr as Mrs. Nancy Wiggs
- Vivia Ogden as Miss Tabitha Hazy
- Gladys Valerie as Maggie Duncan
- Gareth Hughes as Billy Wiggs
- Jack McLean as Dick Morgan (credited as Jack MacLean)
- Maud Hosford as Mrs. 'Phroney Morgan
- Lawrence Johnson as Tommy
- May McAvoy as Australy Wiggs

uncredited

- Anita Brown as Mrs. Schultz
- Mary Davis as Mrs. Eichorn
- Lola Hernandez as Asia Wiggs
- Robert Milasch as Hiram Stubbins
- Marian Stewart as Baby Wiggs
- Wanda Valle as Europena Wiggs

== Other adaptations ==
The 1919 film is the second film adaptation of the novel. The first film version was released in 1914, starring Blanche Chapman. The third version was released in 1934 and stars Pauline Lord while the fourth version was released in 1942 and stars Fay Bainter.

The book was also adapted into a radio series which aired from 1935 to 1938.
