= Mrs. Wiggs of the Cabbage Patch (1942 film) =

1942 film by Ralph Murphy

- Directed by: Ralph Murphy
- Written by: Doris Anderson
- Based on: Mrs. Wiggs of the Cabbage Patch by Alice Hegan Rice and play by Anne Crawford Flexner
- Produced by: Ralph Murphy; Sol C. Siegel
- Starring: Fay Bainter; Barbara Jo Allen; Hugh Herbert
- Cinematography: Leo Tover
- Edited by: Anne Bauchens
- Music by: Victor Young
- Distributed by: Paramount Pictures
- Release date: October 1942
- Country: United States
- Language: English

Mrs. Wiggs of the Cabbage Patch is a 1942 American comedy-drama film starring Fay Bainter and directed by Ralph Murphy. It was based on the play by Anne Crawford Flexner that premiered on Broadway in 1904, which was in turn adapted from the 1901 novel of the same name by Alice Hegan Rice.

== Cast ==
- Fay Bainter as Mrs. Elvira Wiggs
- Vera Vague as Tabitha Hazy
- Hugh Herbert as Marcus Throckmorton
- Betty Brewer as Asia Wiggs
- Billy Lee as Jimmy Wiggs
- Carolyn Lee as Europena Wiggs
- Carl Switzer as Billy Wiggs
- Mary Thomas as Australia Wiggs
- Janet Beecher as Mrs. Olcott
- Barbara Britton as Lucy Olcott
- Moroni Olsen as Dr. Olcott
- Clem Bevans as Postman
- Ethel Griffies as Mrs. Graham (uncredited)

== Other adaptations ==
The 1942 version is the fourth film adaptation of the novel. The first film version was released in 1914, starring Blanche Chapman. The second version was released in 1919 and stars Marguerite Clark, while the third version was released in 1934 and stars Pauline Lord.

The book was also adapted into a radio series which aired from 1935 to 1938.
