= Mrs. Wiggs of the Cabbage Patch (1934 film) =

1934 film by Norman Taurog

- box front of VHS tape version from Goodtimes Video
- Directed by: Norman Taurog
- Screenplay by: William Slavens McNutt; Jane Storm
- Based on: Mrs. Wiggs of the Cabbage Patch by Alice Hegan Rice play by Anne Crawford Flexner
- Produced by: Douglas MacLean
- Starring: Pauline Lord; W. C. Fields; ZaSu Pitts
- Cinematography: Charles Lang
- Edited by: Hugh Bennett
- Music by: John Leipold
- Production company: Paramount Pictures
- Distributed by: Paramount Pictures
- Release date: October 19, 1934 (United States)
- Running time: 80 minutes
- Country: United States
- Language: English

Mrs. Wiggs of the Cabbage Patch is a 1934 American comedy drama film directed by Norman Taurog. It is based on the 1904 Broadway play by Anne Crawford Flexner, which was taken from the novel of the same name by Alice Hegan Rice. The film stars Broadway stage actress Pauline Lord, ZaSu Pitts and W. C. Fields.

The 1934 version is the third film adaptation of the novel and play. The first film version was released in 1914, starring Blanche Chapman. The second version was released in 1919 and stars Mary Carr, while the fourth version was released in 1942 and stars Fay Bainter. The book was also adapted into a radio series that aired from 1935 to 1938.

== Plot ==
In 1901, Mrs. Wiggs and her children are facing eviction, left destitute when Mr. Wiggs departed many years ago to search for gold in the Klondike. The family owns the shack, but it has a mortgage of $25 and the evil lender is threatening them. Mrs. Wiggs is a laundress who cannot save money because of her charity toward others, often animals. Her oldest son James has worked hard all his life but now is seriously ill with tuberculosis. The little girls are all named after continents: Europena, Asia and Australia. The second-oldest boy Billy finds a spavined and dying horse that he brings home. The family nurses the horse back to reasonable health, naming it Cuba. Neighbor Tabitha Hazy seeks a husband and begins a subscription to "The Matrimonial Guide", a type of dating service.

Alice, a wealthy girl volunteer social worker, brings the family a feast of a Thanksgiving dinner. Her fiancé Mr. Bob, the town newspaper editor, takes Jimmy to a hospital. Billy makes enough money to take the family to a vaudeville variety show, and Mrs. Wiggs describes it all to Jimmy as he dies. She places an advertisement in national newspapers directed to her husband and saying that Jimmy is dead and that Mr. Wiggs must come home.

Tabitha has found a man whom she likes, but she fears he will not like her because she cannot cook. Mrs. Wiggs conspires with her to serve an exquisite dinner. When the man learns the truth, he refuses to marry her. In the midst of the household confusion, Mr. Wiggs arrives and sits quietly in a corner until he is noticed. He is secretly given enough money by Mr. Bob to pay the mortgage.

== Cast ==
- Pauline Lord as Mrs. Wiggs
- W.C. Fields as Mr. C. Ellsworth Stubbins
- ZaSu Pitts as Miss Tabitha Hazy
- Evelyn Venable as Lucy Olcott
- Kent Taylor as Bob Redding
- Charles B. Middleton as Mr. Bagby
- Donald Meek as Mr. Hiram Wiggs
- Jimmy Butler as Billy Wiggs
- George Breakston as Jimmy Wiggs
- Edith Fellows as Australia Wiggs
- Virginia Weidler as Europena Wiggs
- Carmencita Johnson as Asia Wiggs
- George Reed as Julius
- Mildred Gover as Priscilla
- Arthur Housman as Dick Harris
- Walter Walker as Dr. Barton
- Sam Flint as Railroad Agent Jenkins
- James Robinson as Mose - Newspaper Office Boy
- Edward Tamblyn as Usher
- Al Shaw as half of vaudeville team
- Sam Lee as other half of vaudeville team (Shaw and Lee were a vaudeville team)
- Del Henderson as House Manage
- George Pearce as Minister
- Lillian Elliott as Mrs. Bagby

== Reception ==
The film was one of Paramount's greatest hits of the year, although it was less successful than the studio originally hoped.

In a contemporary review for The New York Times, critic Andre Sennwald wrote: "The cynics who fled down the side streets upon being informed that Hollywood had taken up Mrs. Wiggs may now come back. Norman Taurog and his assistants have wrestled a surprising sum of merriment out of the tearful minor classic which your little sister wagged her pigtails over while you were deep in the perilous histories of Nick Carter. ... All in all, 'Mrs. Wiggs of the Cabbage Patch' has been bullied into a genuinely amusing carnival for this disrespectful year of grace."
