= Wild Brian Kent =

1936 film by Howard Bretherton

- Directed by: Howard Bretherton
- Written by: Harold Bell Wright (novel); James Gruen; Earle Snell
- Produced by: Sol Lesser
- Starring: Ralph Bellamy; Mae Clarke; Helen Lowell
- Cinematography: Harry Neumann
- Edited by: Robert O. Crandall
- Music by: Abe Meyer
- Production company: Sol Lesser Productions
- Distributed by: Twentieth Century Fox
- Release date: November 6, 1936
- Running time: 57 minutes
- Country: United States
- Language: English

Wild Brian Kent is a 1936 American drama film directed by Howard Bretherton and starring Ralph Bellamy, Mae Clarke and Helen Lowell.

== Cast ==
- Ralph Bellamy as Brian Kent
- Mae Clarke as Betty Prentice
- Helen Lowell as Aunt Sue Prentice
- Stanley Andrews as Tony Baxter
- Richard Alexander as Phil Hansen
- Lew Kelly as Bill
- Eddy Chandler as Jed
- Jack Duffy as Old-time fireman
- Howard C. Hickman as Bob Cruikshank
- Horace B. Carpenter as Warning Rider
- Lester Dorr as Croupier
- Herman Hack as Jed's Henchman
- Henry Hall as Sheriff / Race Announcer
- Elaine Koehler as Little Girl
- Merrill McCormick as Bearded Man in Grandstand
- Gertrude Messinger as Operator
- Russell Simpson as Race Judge
- Arthur Thalasso as Man sent to buy drinks
- Wally West as Gambling Patron

== See also ==
- The Re-Creation of Brian Kent (1925)

== Bibliography ==
- Goble, Alan. The Complete Index to Literary Sources in Film. Walter de Gruyter, 1999.
