= Lovey Mary =

1926 silent film by King Baggot

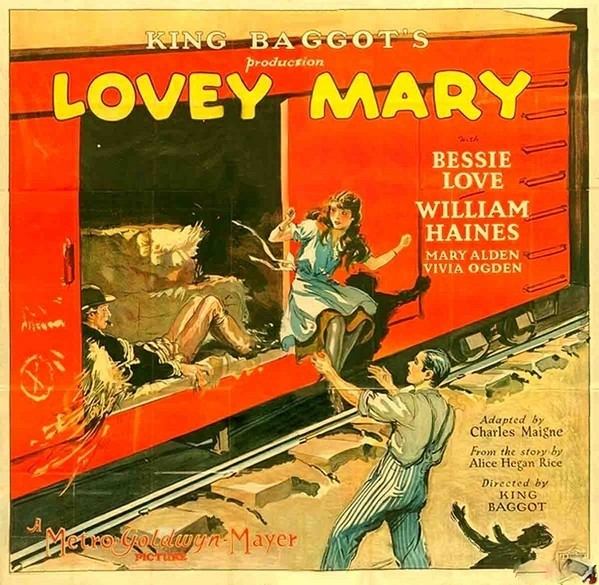
- Poster
- Directed by: King Baggot
- Written by: Agnes Christine Johnston; Charles Maigne; George Marion, Jr. (titles)
- Based on: Lovey Mary (novel) by Alice Hegan Rice
- Starring: Bessie Love; William Haines; Mary Alden
- Cinematography: Ira H. Morgan
- Edited by: Frank Davis
- Distributed by: Metro-Goldwyn-Mayer
- Release date: June 26, 1926 (U.S.)
- Running time: 7 reels; 6,167 feet
- Country: United States
- Language: Silent (English intertitles)

Lovey Mary is a 1926 American comedy-drama film directed by King Baggot, with Bessie Love in the title role. It is based on the 1903 novel of the same name by Alice Hegan Rice, a sequel to Rice's Mrs. Wiggs of the Cabbage Patch. It was distributed by Metro-Goldwyn-Mayer.

The film survives, but is incomplete.

== Plot ==
Lovey Mary runs away from an orphanage with Tommy so that he will not have to return to his bad mother. Lovey and Tommy stay at the home of Miss Hazey, who is about to marry a man whom she knows only from correspondence.

Billy Wiggs lives next door, and Lovey works with his sisters in a factory to earn money for herself and Tommy. On the day of Miss Hazey's wedding, her fiancee recognizes Lovey from the orphanage and reveals her true identity. Lovey and Billy plan to marry and adopt Tommy.

== Cast ==
- Bessie Love as Lovey Mary
- William Haines as Billy Wiggs
- Mary Alden as Mrs. Wiggs
- Vivia Ogden as Miss Hazey (Note: Ogden revived the role she played on Broadway in Mrs. Wiggs in 1906.)
- Martha Mattox as Miss Bell
- Jackie Combs as Tommy
- Fred Cox as Baby Tommy
- Gloria Holt as Europena
- Mary Jane Irving as Asia
- Annabelle Magnus as Australia
- Eileen Percy as Kate
- Russell Simpson as Stubbins
- Rosa Gore as Miss Eichorn
- Sunshine Hart as Mrs. Chultz

== Production ==
To help her decide whether to participate in the film, MGM lent Bessie Love a copy of the novel Lovey Mary by Alice Hegan Rice in 1925—then-valued at $25 (equivalent to $460 in 2025). Love never returned the book.
