= Eleanor Robson Belmont =

English actress

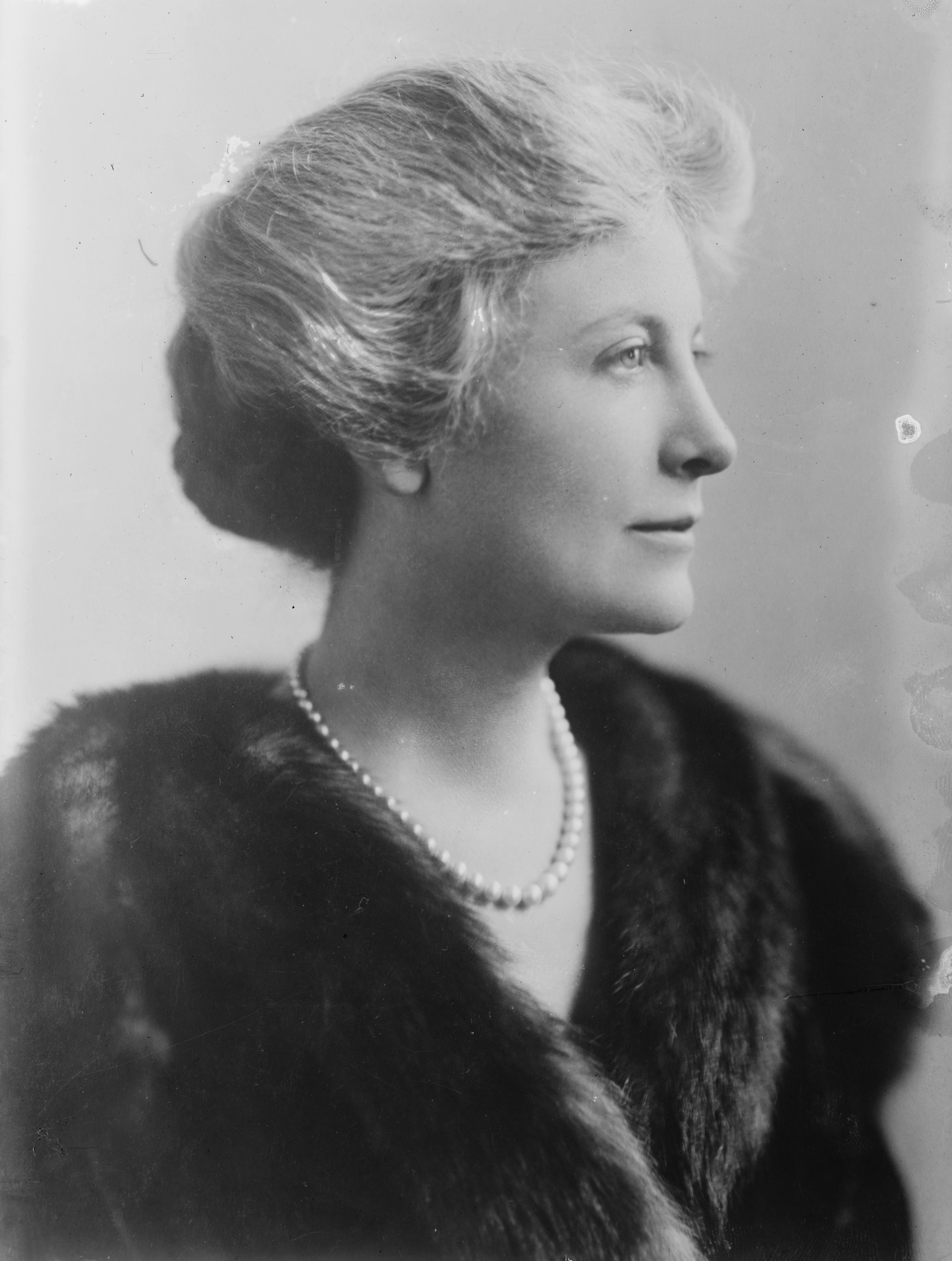
- Belmont in 1916
- Born: Eleanor Elise Robson; 13 December 1879; Wigan, Lancashire, England
- Died: 24 October 1979 (aged 99); New York City, New York, U.S.
- Resting place: Island Cemetery, Newport, Rhode Island
- Occupation: Stage actress
- Spouse: August Belmont, Jr. (m. 1910; died 1924)
- Parent(s): Charles Robson; Madge Carr Cook

Eleanor Elise Robson Belmont (13 December 1879 – 24 October 1979) was an English actress and prominent public figure in the United States. George Bernard Shaw wrote Major Barbara for her, but contractual problems prevented her from playing the role. Mrs. Belmont was involved in the Metropolitan Opera Association as the first woman on the board of directors, and she founded the Metropolitan Opera Guild.

== Early life ==
Eleanor Elise Robson was born on 13 December 1879 in Wigan, Lancashire. She was the daughter of Madge Carr Cook and Charles Robson. Her mother was an English-born American stage actress and as a young girl, Eleanor moved to the United States. Her father disappeared or deserted her mother in 1880, and her mother remarried to Augustus Cook in 1891. Cook later sued her for annulment of their marriage.

== Career ==
Her stage career began at age 17 in San Francisco and she worked in stock companies from Honolulu to Milwaukee. In 1899, she was a member of the summer stock company at the Elitch Theatre—the original Summer stock theatre.

She made her New York debut in 1900 as Bonita, the ranchman's daughter in Augustus Thomas's Arizona.

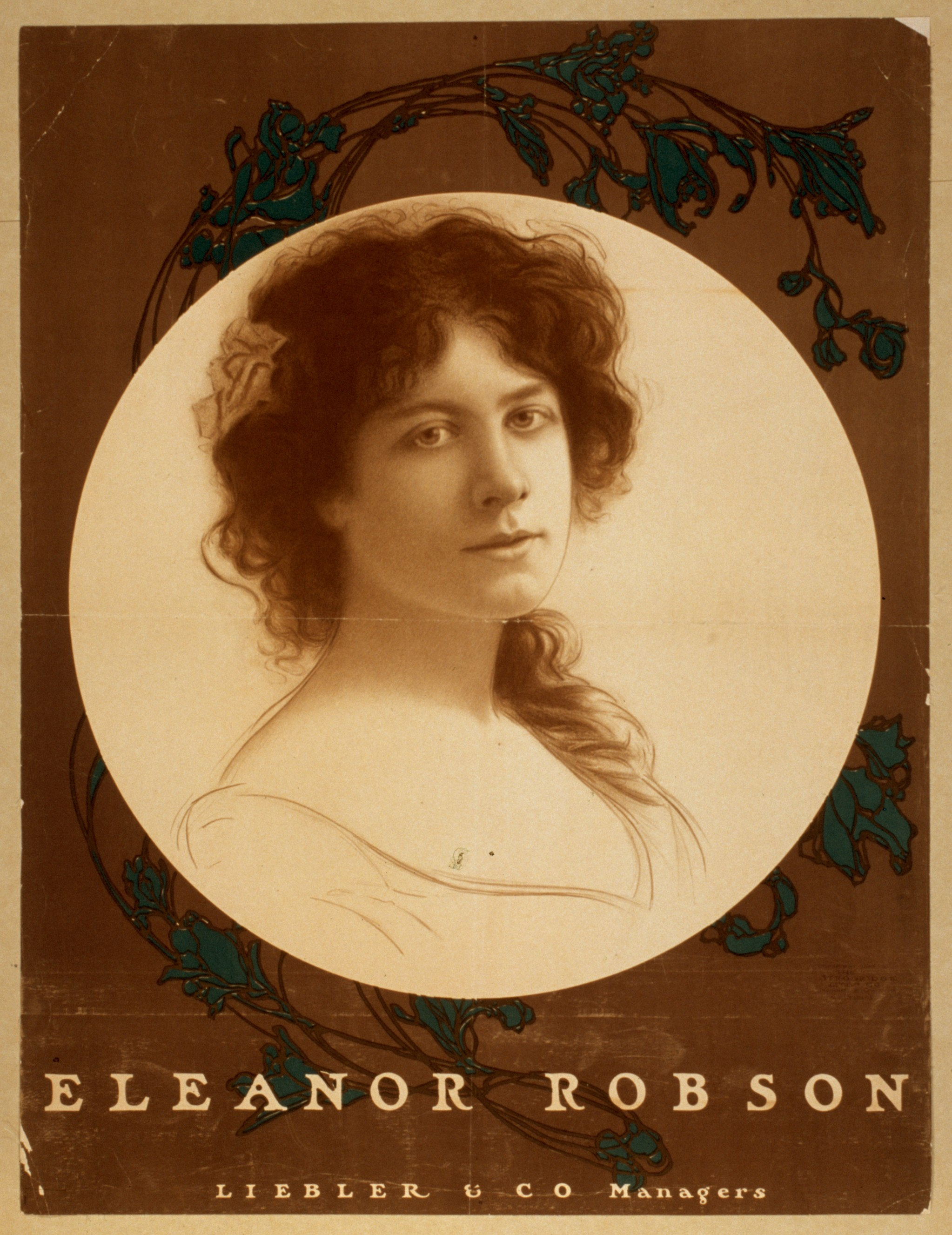
Theatre poster, 1903

Her ten-year career as a leading Broadway actress included top roles in such plays as Robert Browning's In a Balcony (1900), Shakespeare's Romeo and Juliet (1903) opposite Kyrle Bellew, Israel Zangwill's Merely Mary Ann (1903–04 and 1907), Oliver Goldsmith's She Stoops to Conquer (1905), Zangwill's Nurse Marjorie (1906), and Paul Armstrong's adaptation of Bret Harte's Salomy Jane (1907).

Robson authored a play, Christopher Rand, which had the unfortunate timing of opening in New Haven just as the stock market crashed in October 1929, resulting in its anticipated Broadway run being cancelled.

=== Philanthropy ===
In 1912, she started the Society for the Prevention of Useless Giving (SPUG) with Anne Tracy Morgan. Belmont joined the Metropolitan Opera's board of directors in 1933, founded the Metropolitan Opera Guild in 1935 and the National Council of the Metropolitan Opera in 1952. These organisations helped shape the multi-source public-private funding model used by US performing arts organisations in the ensuing decades

== Personal life ==
Upon her marriage to August Belmont Jr. on 26 February 1910, Eleanor retired from the stage. August and Eleanor were married for over fourteen years until his death on 10 December 1924. Belmont died in her sleep in New York City on 24 October 1979. She was 99 years old.
