= Society for the Prevention of Useless Giving =

American anti-consumerist group

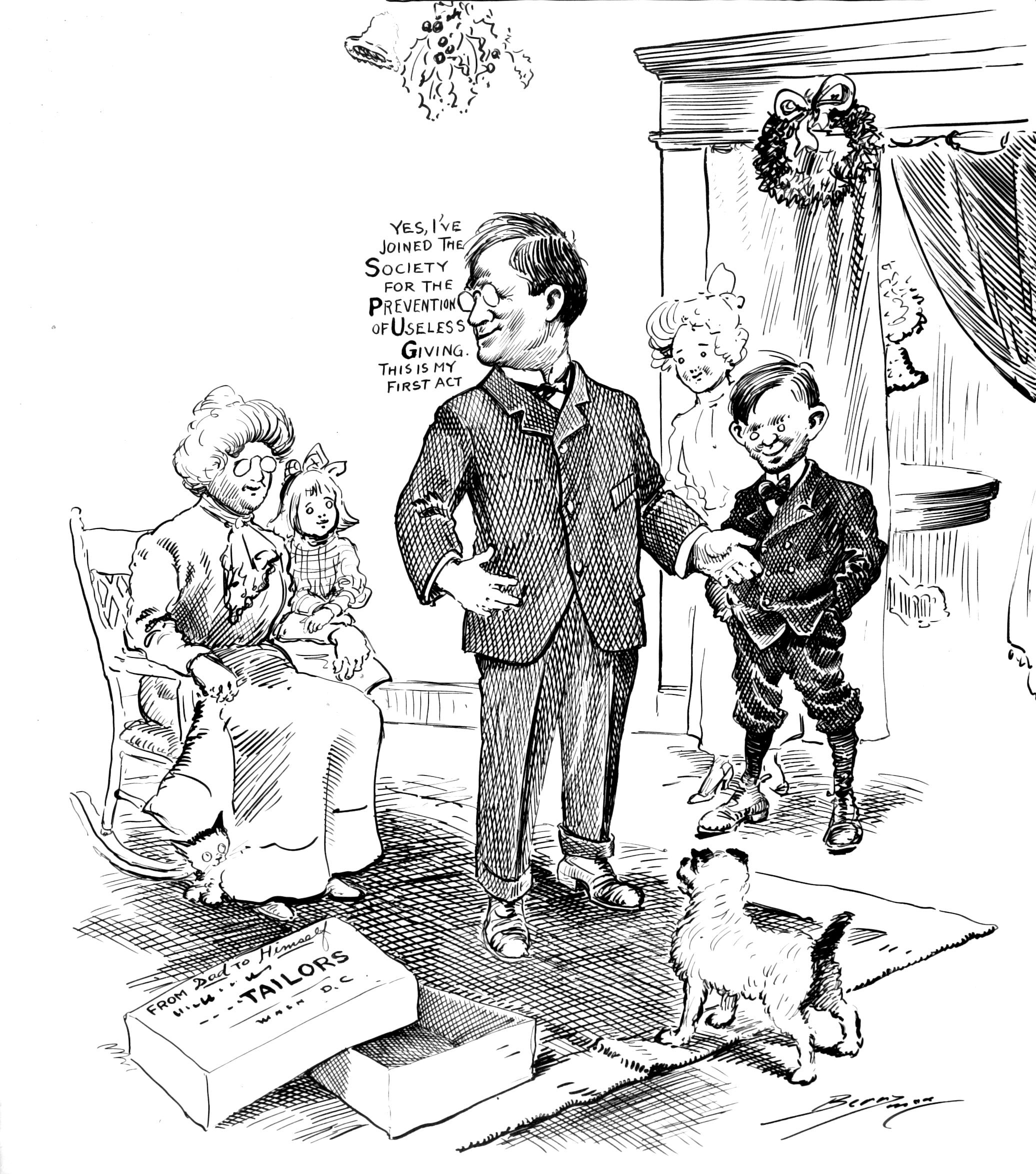
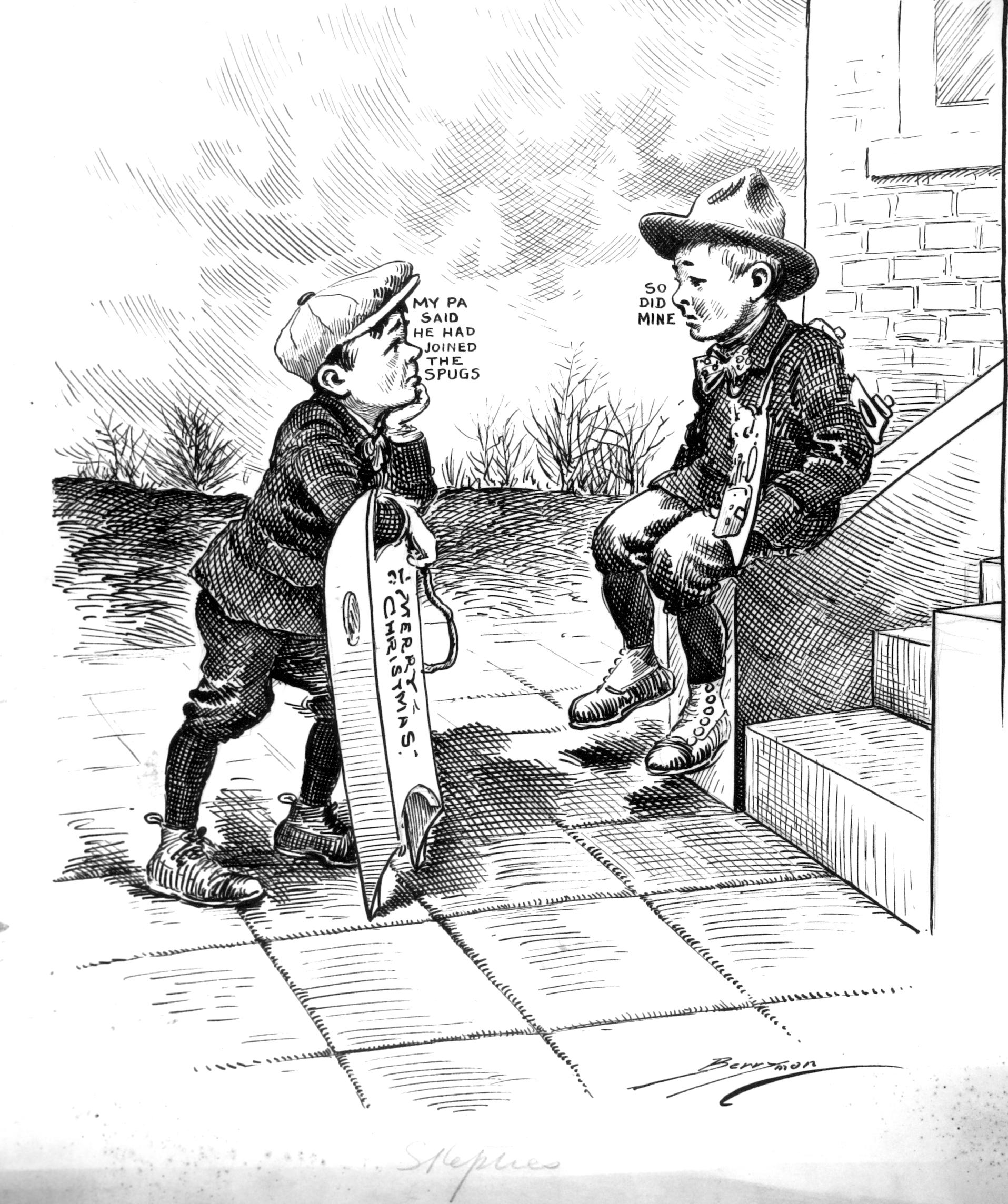
Cartoons by Clifford K. Berryman caricaturing SPUG

The Society for the Prevention of Useless Giving (SPUG) was a campaign group in New York against pointless gifts at Christmas, and particularly against the exploitation of junior employees by their supervisors.

It was founded in 1912 by the actress and socialite Eleanor Robson Belmont and Anne Morgan, daughter of J.P. Morgan, along with a few dozen women in New York City. Both of these ladies were rich and philanthropically inclined to improving the lot of working women in New York.

The SPUG was established in response to what the women perceived to be unnecessary Christmas-related materialism, as well as the era’s custom of employees giving gifts to bosses and higher-ups in exchange for workplace favours. Frequently the gifts given were expensive, costing up to two weeks’ worth of wages. This would have negatively affected female employees to a greater degree than their male counterparts, as women have been found to spend more time and money on gifts, and to experience a higher degree of gender expectations and social pressure around gifting.

Between 1912 and 1913 the group grew to 6,000 members.

Rallies were held by the SPUG, and promoted female solidarity, even if class divisions lingered, giving the occasions an air of maternalistic charity and sisterhood.

SPUG membership was initially restricted to women, however men were later permitted to join, primarily as a result of President Theodore Roosevelt, who, in December 1912, became the first “man Spug”, promoting hundreds of others to join the movement to reduce Christmas gift giving.

“I believe the group can accomplish what the individual cannot—namely, the gradual substitution of the right spirit of Christmas giving, in place of the custom of ‘collective’ and ‘exchange’ presents which exists to-day,” read the society membership card Roosevelt signed. “I agree to pay 10c. a year dues and wear during all campaigns the Spug button.”

By Christmas 1914 the society stalled, as a result of war which had erupted in Europe, and which drew the attentions of SPUG founders Belmont and Morgan.

In recent years, SPUG's opposition to consumerist trivia has once again found favor.
