= Sunshine Nan =

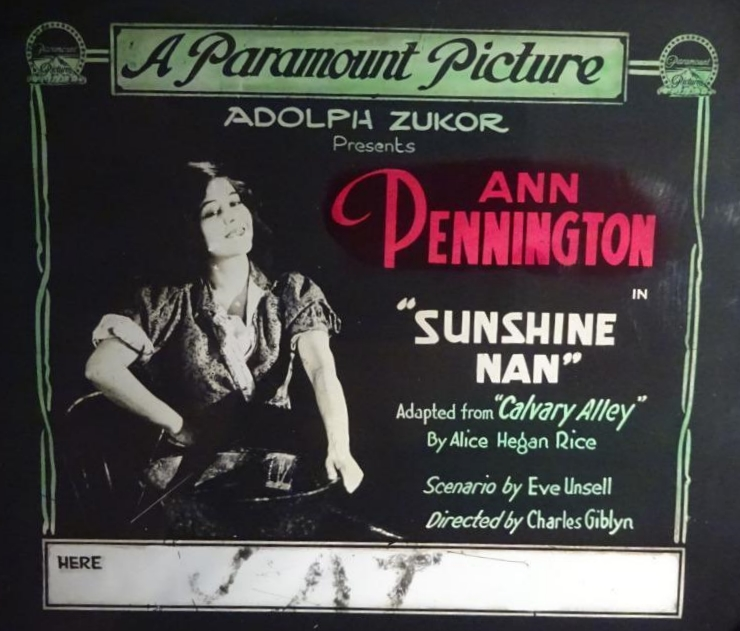
- Lantern slide
- Directed by: Charles Giblyn
- Written by: Eve Unsell (scenario)
- Based on: Calvary Alley by Alice Hegan Rice
- Produced by: Adolph Zukor; Jesse Lasky
- Starring: Ann Pennington
- Cinematography: Hal Young
- Production company: Famous Players–Lasky Corporation
- Distributed by: Paramount Pictures
- Release date: March 11, 1918
- Running time: 50 minutes; 5 reels
- Country: United States
- Language: Silent (English intertitles)

Sunshine Nan is a 1918 American silent comedy-drama film starring Ann Pennington and directed by Charles Giblyn. It is based on the novel Calvary Alley by Alice Hegan Rice. It was produced by Famous Players–Lasky and distributed by Paramount Pictures.

== Plot ==
As described in a film magazine, Nance Molloy and Dan Lewis, children of the slums, are sweethearts. They become mixed up in the death of a neighbor and are sent to reform school. Upon their release they are employed at the Clark Shoe Factory. MacPherson Clark, son of the owner of the factory, endeavors to steal the formula of a dye developed by Dan, but Nan frustrates his efforts. The patent for the dye brings wealth to Nan and Dan and they are wed.

== Cast ==
- Ann Pennington as Nance Molloy
- Richard Barthelmess as MacPherson Clark
- Johnny Hines as Dan Lewis (credited as John Hines)
- Helen Tracy as Mrs. Snawdor
- Charles Eldridge as Mr. Snawdor
- James A. Furey (credited as J.A. Furey)
- Mrs. Lewis McCord
- Frank Losee

== Preservation ==
A copy of Sunshine Nan survives in Archives du Film du CNC in Paris, France.
