= A Feather in Her Hat =

1935 film by Alfred Santell

- 1935 American theatrical poster
- Directed by: Alfred Santell
- Screenplay by: Lawrence Hazard
- Based on: A Feather in Her Hat; 1934 novel by Ida Alexa Ross Wylie
- Produced by: Everett Riskin
- Starring: Pauline Lord; Basil Rathbone; Louis Hayward; Billie Burke
- Cinematography: Joseph Walker
- Edited by: Viola Lawrence
- Music by: Phil Boutelje
- Production company: Columbia Pictures
- Distributed by: Columbia Pictures
- Release date: October 25, 1935
- Running time: 72 minutes
- Country: United States
- Language: English

A Feather in Her Hat is a 1935 American drama film directed by Alfred Santell starring Pauline Lord, Basil Rathbone and Louis Hayward. It is based on the 1934 novel of the same name by I. A. R. Wylie about a working-class British woman with ambitions for her son. The film was produced and distributed by Hollywood studio Columbia Pictures.

== Plot ==
In 1925 London, middle-aged, widowed shopkeeper Clarissa Phipps pities genteel, but homeless drunkard Captain Randolph Courtney and takes him in. When Courtney corrects the lower-class accent and grammar of her son Richard, an idea is born. Richard benefits from Courtney's tutelage as he grows up.

Ten years later, on Richard's twenty-first birthday, Clarissa makes a startling announcement. She is not his mother but was merely hired to raise him for his upper-class parents. She gives him a bank passbook with a balance of £1000 as arranged with his real mother and asks him to move out on his own. Richard and Courtney are both stunned. Emily Judson, with whom Richard has grown up, is distressed as well; she had hoped to marry him, but now feels he is out of her reach.

From Clarissa's private papers and what she had said, Courtney guesses that Richard's mother is Julia Trent Anders, a former star actress. Would-be playwright Richard, seeking to get to know her, becomes a lodger in her mansion, where he also meets her absentminded scientist husband Paul and her beautiful stepdaughter Pauline. Richard and Pauline are attracted to each other, much to the annoyance of rival suitor Leo Cartwright. Pauline becomes aware of Emily's prior claim, however, and desists.

When Julia discovers that her tenant has written a play (with a starring role suitable for her comeback), she introduces him to her friend, producer Sir Elroyd Joyce. Joyce reads his play as a favor to Julia; however, while he sees promise in Richard's work, it would be too expensive for him to produce. When Clarissa finds out, she sells her shop and uses most of the proceeds to secretly finance it without Richard's knowledge.

She and Courtney proudly attend the premiere of Son of Sixpence. The play is a success, but the experience is too much for Clarissa, already in very bad health. On her deathbed, she admits to Richard that she is actually his mother after all. Emily, admitting defeat, concedes Richard to Pauline.

== Cast ==
- Pauline Lord as Clarissa Phipps
- Basil Rathbone as Captain Randolph Courtney
- Louis Hayward as Richard Orland
- Billie Burke as Julia Trent Anders
- Wendy Barrie as Pauline Anders
- Nydia Westman as Emily Judson
- Victor Varconi as Paul Anders
- Thurston Hall as Sir Elroyd Joyce
- Nana Bryant as Lady Drake
- J. M. Kerrigan as Pobjay
- Doris Lloyd as Liz Vanning
- David Niven as Leo Cartwright
- Lawrence Grant as Doctor Phillips
- John Rogers as Henry Vining
- E. E. Clive as Higgins, Pub Landlord
- Ottola Nesmith as Susan
- Tempe Pigott as Katy
- Agnes Steele as Mrs. Probert
- Leyland Hodgson as Leading Man
- Wilson Benge as Butcher
- Kay Deslys as Barmaid
- Herbert Heywood as Fishmonger
- Carrie Daumery as Dowager
- Thomas R. Mills as Stage Manager
- Leonard Mudie as Hyde Park Orator
- Fred Walton as Heckler
- Olaf Hytten as Taxi Driver
- Dennis O'Keefe as Theatregoer

== Bibliography ==
- Hayter-Menzies, Grant. Mrs. Ziegfeld: The Public and Private Lives of Billie Burke. McFarland, 2009.
