= Helen Lowell =

American actress (1866–1937)

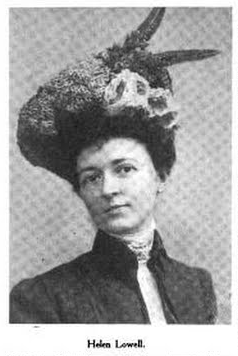
- Helen Lowell from a 1909 publication
- Born: Helen Lowell Robb; June 2, 1866; New York, U.S.
- Died: June 29, 1937 (aged 71); Los Angeles, California, U.S.
- Occupation: Actress
- Years active: 1884 to 1937 (stage and film)

Helen Lowell, born Helen Lowell Robb (1866–1937), was an American stage and film actress.

== Life ==
Lowell was born in New York on June 2, 1866, to William and Mary Robb. In 1884, she debuted in the title role of Iolanthe at the Academy of Music in New York. At the age of 21, her mother died. She was known for playing the role of Mrs. Errol in Little Lord Fauntleroy. In 1895, she played Charlotte Corday. She appeared in J.M.Barrie's Quality Street, creating the role of Susan Throssell in the first New York production with Maude Adams, who starred as Phoebe Throssell.

In October 1903, she appeared on stage in Mrs. Wiggs of the Cabbage Patch in Louisville, Kentucky. She toured Australia, New Zealand, Hawaii and the U.S. for the next seven years playing Miss Hazy "in the Cabbage Patch".

She had a successful career as a stage comedienne, appearing on Broadway in The Torch-Bearers (1922), then she went to Hollywood in 1934 where she appeared in Side Streets, which was a Warner Bros film. She became known as the first choice for playing middle-aged women.

On June 29, 1937, Lowell was found dead in her hotel room in Hollywood.

== Theater ==
- Little Lord Fauntleroy
- Mrs. Wiggs of the Cabbage Patch as Miss Hazey
- Cappy

== Selected filmography ==
- Isn't Life Wonderful (1924) as The Grandmother
- Side Streets (1934) as Tillie
- The Merry Frinks (1934) as Grandma Frink
- Party Wire (1935) as Nettie Putnam
- The Goose and the Gander (1935) as Aunt Julia
- Strike Me Pink (1936) as Hattie 'Ma' Carson
- I'd Give My Life (1936) as Mrs. Bancroft Sr.
- Wild Brian Kent (1936) Aunt Sue Prentice
- Four Days' Wonder (1936)
- Snowed Under (1936) as Mrs. Canterbury
- Michael O'Halloran (1937) as Hettie

== Bibliography ==
- Goble, Alan. The Complete Index to Literary Sources in Film. Walter de Gruyter, 1999.
