= Side Streets (1934 film) =

1934 film

- Directed by: Alfred E. Green
- Written by: Manuel Seff
- Based on: story "Fur Coats" by Ann Garrick and Ethel Hill
- Produced by: Samuel Bischoff (uncredited)
- Starring: Aline MacMahon; Paul Kelly; Ann Dvorak; Dorothy Tree
- Cinematography: Byron Haskin
- Edited by: Herbert Levy
- Music by: Heinz Roemheld (uncredited)
- Production company: First National Pictures
- Distributed by: First National Pictures
- Release date: July 14, 1934
- Running time: 63 minutes
- Country: United States
- Language: English
- Budget: $166,000
- Box office: $191,000

Side Streets, also known in the UK as A Woman in Her Thirties, is a 1934 American romantic melodrama directed by Alfred E. Green. The film stars Aline MacMahon, Paul Kelly, Ann Dvorak and Dorothy Tree. The screenplay concerns a spinster who hires, then marries, a destitute sailor who is not always faithful.

== Plot ==
Middle-aged spinster Madame Valerie (real name is Bertha) hires derelict sailor Tim O'Hara to work in her fur shop. Tim is younger and has a roving eye.

When Tim discovers his wife is expecting his child, he gives up his wild ways and becomes a devoted husband. He even gives up his girlfriend Marguerite. Once the baby is born, he is also a devoted father. Unfortunately, the baby dies.

The girlfriend shows up at the shop looking for Tim. She confesses to Bertha that she needs money to care for Tim's baby, not knowing she is speaking to his wife.

Bertha, being so kind hearted, went to the girlfriend and gave her "Tim's last weeks pay" and promises to help often financially. She even gives her the fur jacket they had made for her own baby.

Bertha had asked her niece, Ilka to come help out at the shop while she was pregnant and stayed on. Tim and Ilka begin an affair and decide to run away together.

Marguerite shows up at the shop and asks Bertha to take her baby because she wants to marry an Australian. At the same time Tim realizes he loves Bertha and goes home.

== Cast ==
- Aline MacMahon as Bertha Krasnoff/Madame Valerie
- Paul Kelly as Tim O'Hara
- Ann Dvorak as Marguerite Gilbert
- Dorothy Tree as Ilka
- Helen Lowell as Tillie
- Henry O'Neill as George Richards
- Mayo Methot as Maizie Roach
- Renee Whitney as Mabel Vernon
- Lynn Browning as Madeline Ware
- Lorena Layson as Helen Ware
- Dorothy Peterson as Mrs. Richards
- Clay Clement as Jack
- Paul Kaye as Ray

== Reception ==
The New York Times film critic Mordaunt Hall panned Side Streets, calling it "one of those wearying examples of writing down to what the studio believes to be the intelligence level of certain cinema audiences." However, he note that "Miss MacMahon and Mr. Kelly do all that is possible with their thankless roles. Ann Dvorak and Helen Lowell also make the most of their scant opportunities."

=== Box office ===
According to records at Warner Bros. Pictures, the film earned $126,000 in the U.S. and $65,000 in other markets.
