= Anne Crawford Flexner =

American playwright (1874–1955)

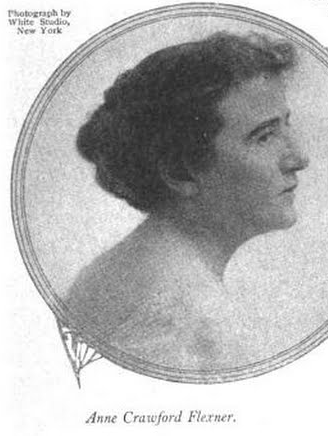
- Anne Crawford Flexner, from a 1919 publication.
- Born: Anne Laziere Crawford; June 27, 1874; Georgetown, Kentucky
- Died: January 11, 1955 (aged 80); Providence, Rhode Island
- Occupation: Playwright
- Spouse: Abraham Flexner
- Children: Eleanor Flexner; Jean Flexner
- Relatives: Simon Flexner (brother-in-law)

Anne Crawford Flexner (June 27, 1874 – January 11, 1955) born Anne Laziere Crawford, was an American playwright.

== Early life and education ==
Anne Laziere Crawford was born in Georgetown, Kentucky, the daughter of Louis G. Crawford and Susan Farnum. She earned a bachelor's degree from Vassar College in 1895. One of her Vassar classmates was newspaper publisher and efficiency expert Georgie Boynton Child; Crawford was matron of honor at Boynton's wedding in 1903.

== Career ==
In 1897, Anne Crawford moved to New York City to seek a literary career. She wrote drama reviews for the Louisville Courier-Journal, and began writing her own plays. Her first success, Miranda of the Balcony (based on a novel by A. E. W. Mason) starred Minnie Maddern Fiske when it opened in 1901. She also adapted the works of her Louisville friend Alice Hegan Rice for the stage, as Mrs. Wiggs of the Cabbage Patch (1904), starring Madge Carr Cook.

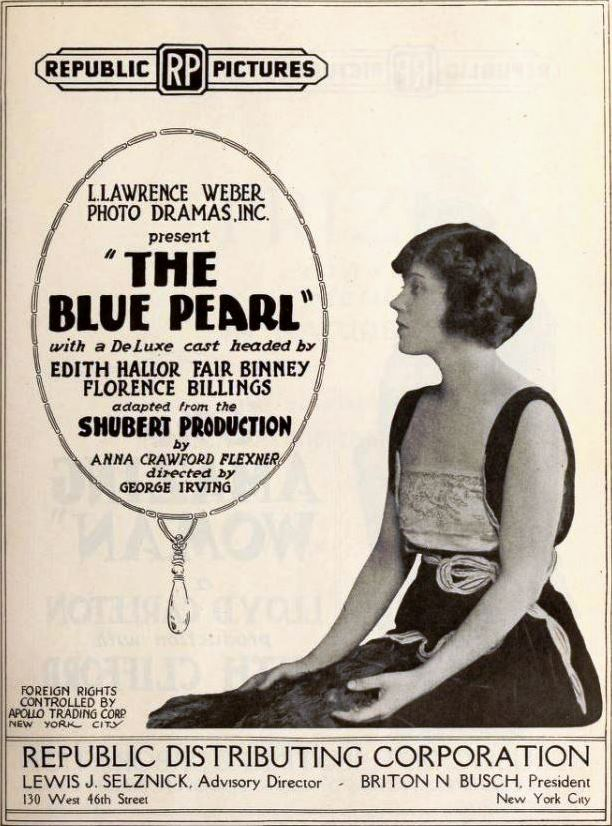
The Blue Pearl (1920); film poster for adaptation of Flexner play.

== Plays by Anne Crawford Flexner ==
- A Man's Woman (1899)
- Miranda of the Balcony (1901)
- Mrs. Wiggs of the Cabbage Patch (1904)
- A Lucky Star (1910)
- The Marriage Game (1913)
- Wanted – An Alibi (1917)
- The Blue Pearl (1918)
- All Soul's Eve (1920)
- Aged 26 (1936)

== Film adaptations ==
Flexner's 1904 play Mrs. Wiggs of the Cabbage Patch was adapted for the screen in 1914, 1919, 1934, and 1942. The Blue Pearl (1918) became a film in 1920, and All Soul's Eve (1920) was adapted for the screen in 1921.

== Personal life ==
Anne Crawford married educator Abraham Flexner in 1898. Their daughter Jean Flexner attended the London School of Economics; their younger daughter Eleanor Flexner (1908–1995) was a noted scholar and proponent of women's studies. Anne Crawford Flexner was hospitalized in mental decline for the last years of her life, and died in 1955, aged 80 years, in Providence, Rhode Island. Some of her papers are included in the Abraham Flexner Papers, in the Library of Congress. Jean Flexner Lewison wrote a biography of her parents, A Family Memoir, 1899–1989, and Abraham Flexner wrote an autobiography, published in 1940.
