= Savoy Theatre (New York City) =

Broadway theatre in Manhattan, New York

Coordinates: 40.74983°N 73.98872°W

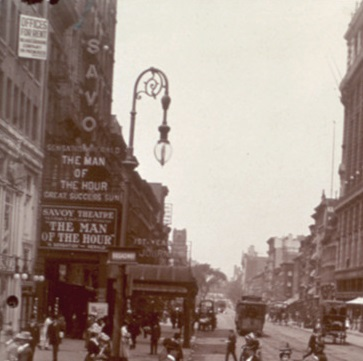
- The Man of the Hour by George Broadhurst playing at the Savoy c. 1907
- Interactive map of Savoy Theatre
- Address: 112 W. 34th St. New York City; United States of America
- Capacity: 841
- Current use: Demolished

Construction
- Opened: 1900
- Demolished: 1952

The Savoy Theatre was a Broadway theatre at 112 West 34th Street in Midtown Manhattan, New York City. It opened in 1900 (for its first few months as Schley Music Hall). It was converted to a cinema around 1910, until it was closed in early 1952 and then demolished. (Note: A different Broadway theatre, at 1195–1203 Broadway, on the southwest corner of 29th Street, was called Savoy Theatre from December 14, 1896 to October 1897.)

== History ==
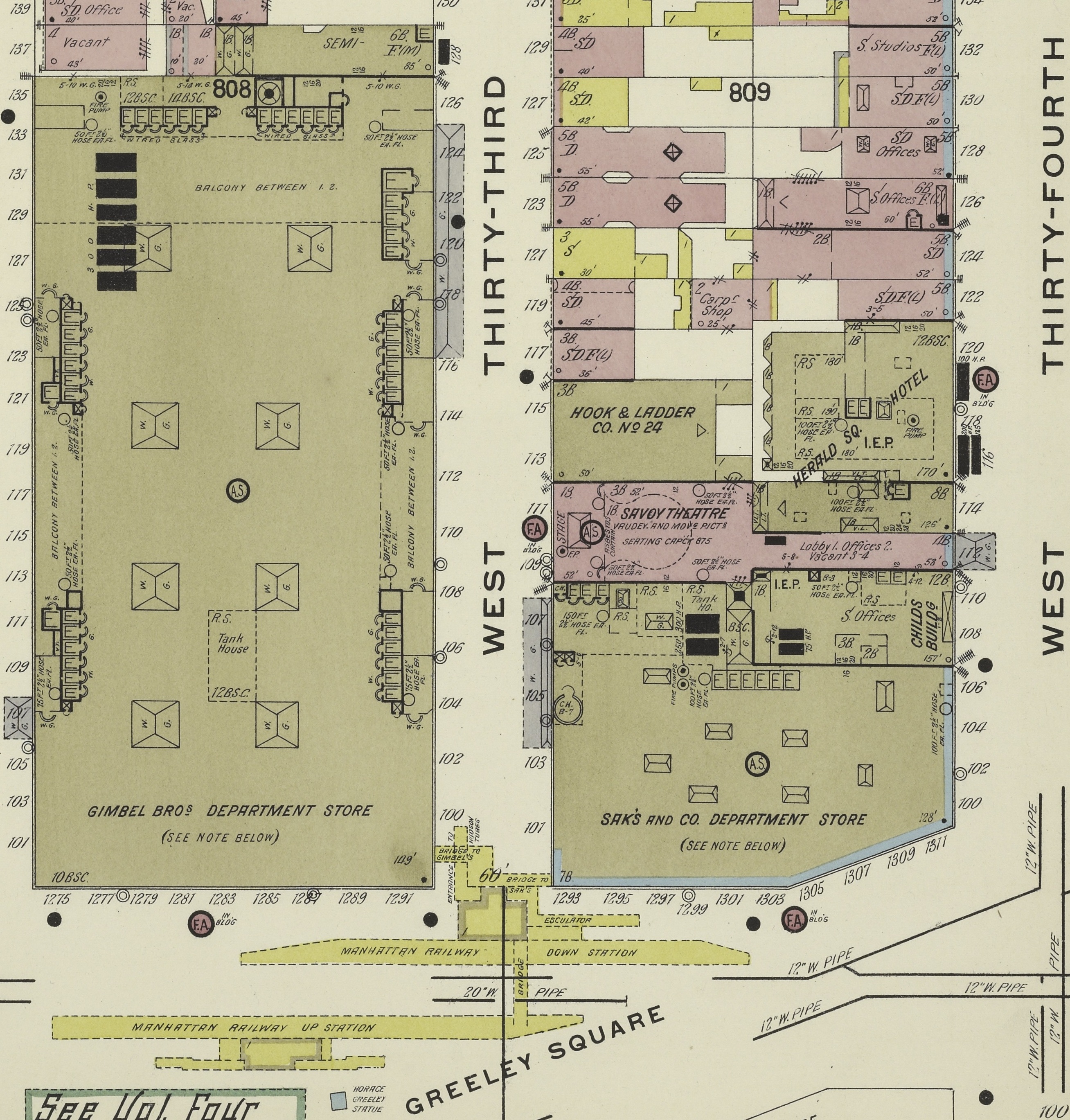
The Savoy Theatre on a map published in 1911

George Krause, a manager of other theatres, with financial backing of Tammany Hall politician Timothy D. Sullivan, built Schley Music Hall at 112 West 34th Street, on the south side of the street, and west of Broadway. The site adjoined the Herald Square Hotel. It had a frontage of 18 feet on 34th Street, and 50 feet on 33rd Street. It seated about 840, but the floor chairs were folding chairs.

It opened on February 26, 1900, aiming to show vaudeville and burlesque fare. Kraus immediately sold out his stake to New York Yankees owner Frank J. Farrell, and the venue closed on April 29. Under a new lease by Alfred Aarons, the house reopened on October 8, 1900, as the Savoy Theatre. Aarons only lasted until early February 1901, and Hyde and Behman then leased it, followed by Charles Frohman and Frank McKee, who started performances on September 21, 1901. Notable runs included Mrs. Wiggs of the Cabbage Patch (Sept. 1903-Jan. 1905, 150 perf.), and The Man of the Hour by George Broadhurst (Dec. 1906-Jan. 1908, 479 perf.) starring Douglas Fairbanks.

Around late 1910, play performances ceased. The venue was leased by Walter Reade Sr. (then Walter Rosenberg), who eventually ran a large chain of movie theatres, and became a movie house. It operated until 1952 (when Reade Sr. also died), and soon the building was demolished.

== Selected productions ==
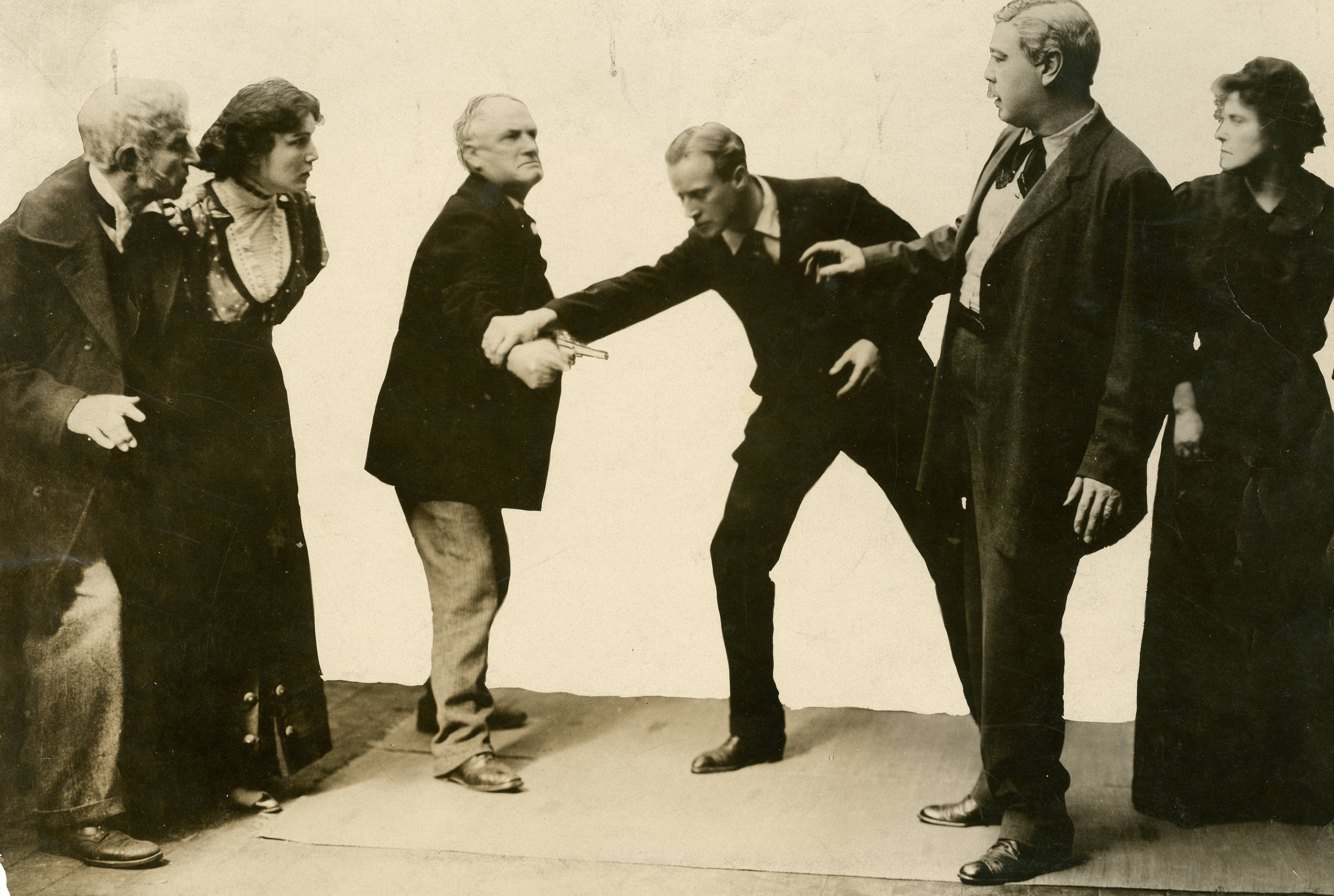
E. M. Holland, Josephine Victor, Gerald Griffin, H. B. Warner, Wilton Lackaye and Grace Filkins in The Battle (1908)

- Soldiers of Fortune by Augustus Thomas (Mar.-May, Aug.-Oct. 1902)
- The Girl with the Green Eyes by Clyde Fitch (Dec. 1902-Mar. 1903, 108 perf.)
- Mrs. Wiggs of the Cabbage Patch (Sept. 1903-Jan. 1905, 150 perf.)
- The Walls of Jericho by Alfred Sutro (Sep. 1905-Feb. 1906, 157 perf.)
- Mr. Hopkinson (Feb.-Apr. 1906, 113 perf.)
- The Man of the Hour by George Broadhurst (Dec. 1906-Jan. 1908, 479 perf.)
- The Battle by Cleveland Moffett (Dec. 1908-Apr. 1909, 144 perf.)
- The Awakening of Helena Richie (Sep. 1909-Jan. 1910, 120 perf.)
