= Sandy (1918 film) =

1918 film by George Melford

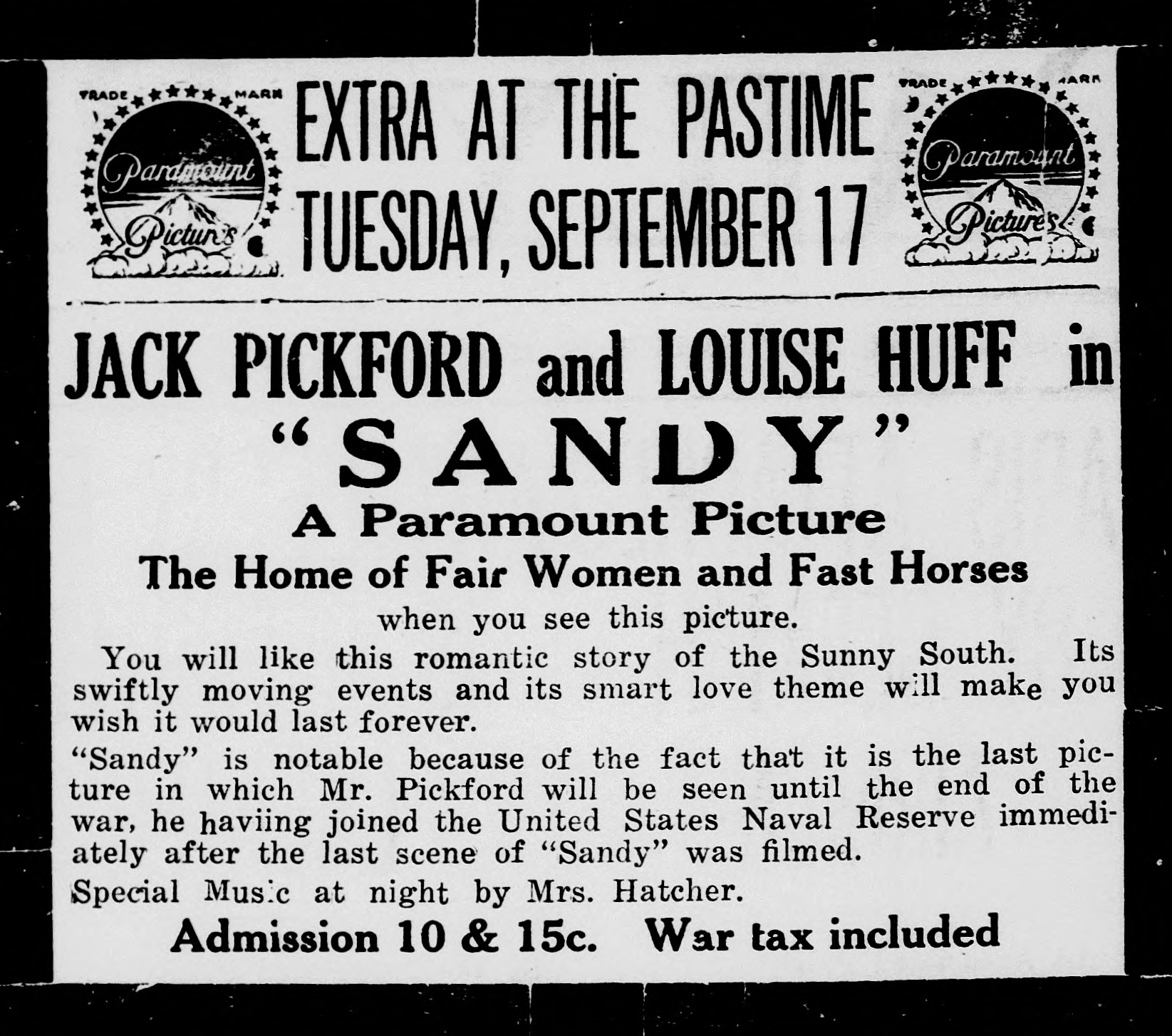
- Contemporary newspaper advertisement
- Directed by: George Melford
- Screenplay by: Alice Hegan Rice; Edith Kennedy
- Produced by: Jesse L. Lasky
- Starring: Jack Pickford; Louise Huff; James Neill; Edythe Chapman; Julia Faye; George Beranger
- Cinematography: Paul P. Perry
- Production company: Famous Players–Lasky Corporation
- Distributed by: Paramount Pictures
- Release date: July 14, 1918
- Running time: 50 minutes
- Country: United States
- Language: Silent (English intertitles)

Sandy is a 1918 American silent drama film directed by George Melford, and written by Alice Hegan Rice and Edith Kennedy. The film stars Jack Pickford, Louise Huff, James Neill, Edythe Chapman, Julia Faye, and George Beranger. The film was released on July 14, 1918, by Paramount Pictures.

== Cast ==
- Jack Pickford as Sandy Kilday
- Louise Huff as Ruth Nelson
- James Neill as Judge Hollis
- Edythe Chapman as Mrs. Hollis
- Julia Faye as Annette Fenton
- George Beranger as Carter Nelson
- Raymond Hatton as Ricks Wilson
- Clarence Geldart as Dr. Fenton
- Louise Hutchinson as Aunt Nelson
- Jennie Lee as Aunt Melvy
- J. Parks Jones as Jimmy Reed
- Don Likes as Sid Gray

== Reception ==
Like many American films of the time, Sandy was subject to cuts by city and state film censorship boards. For example, the Chicago Board of Censors cut, in Reel 4, shooting through window and, in Reel 5, the intertitle "It's Sandy Kilday. We're going to hang him."
