= Madge Carr Cook =

American actress (1856 - 1933)

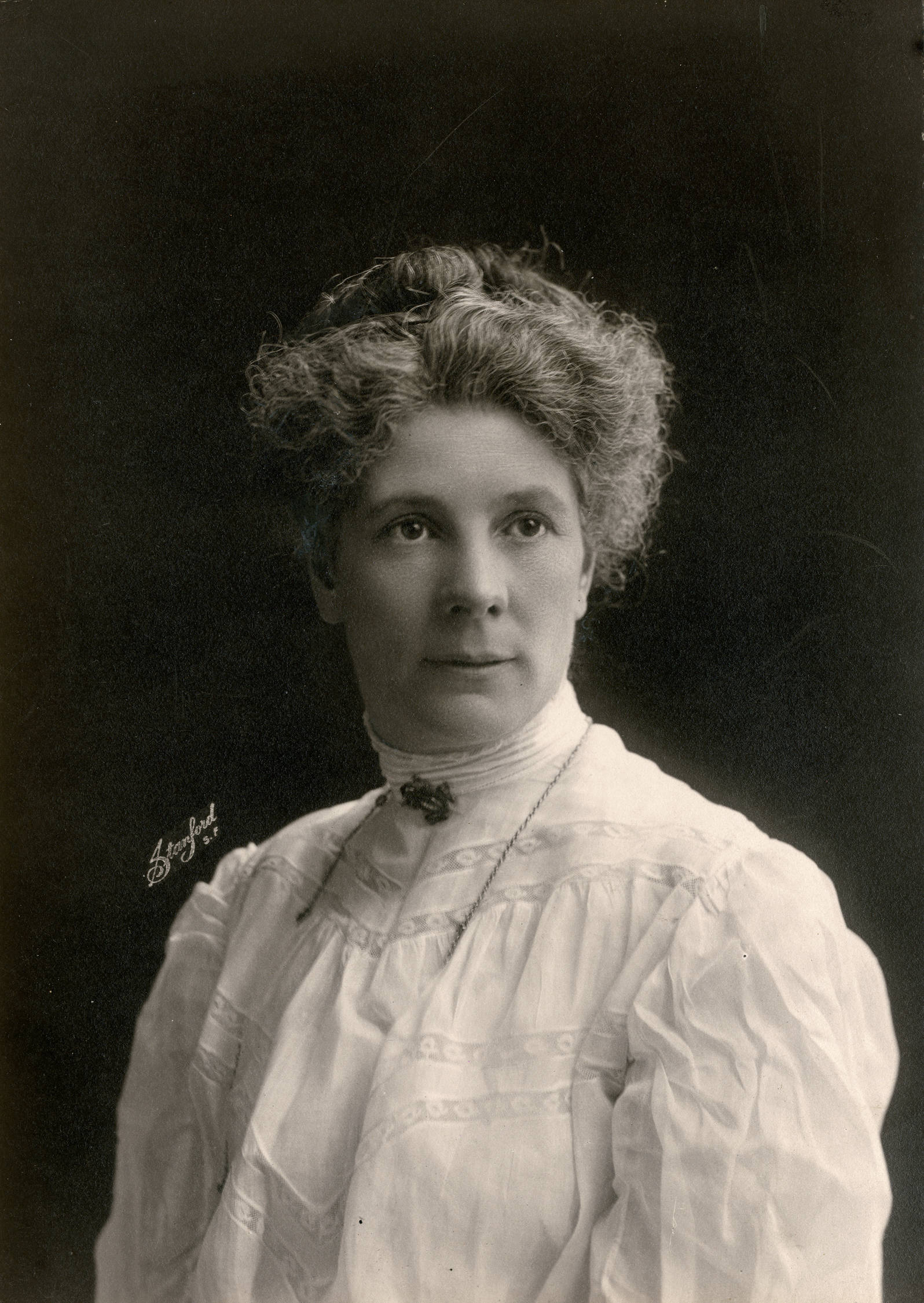
- Born: Madge Carr; June 28, 1856; Yorkshire, England
- Died: September 20, 1933 (aged 77); Long Island, New York, US
- Occupation: Actor
- Spouse(s): Charles Robson (1 child); Augustus Cook
- Children: Eleanor Robson Belmont

Madge Carr Cook (1856–1933) was an English-born American stage actress.

== Biography ==
Cook was born Madge Carr on June 28, 1856, in Yorkshire, England. She debuted on stage at age 3, portraying Fleance in Macbeth in Sunderland, England.

Cook portrayed Mrs. Hunter in the premiere of Clyde Fitch's The Climbers at the Bijou Theatre in 1901. She was most famous for creating the title role in the 1904 Broadway play Mrs. Wiggs of the Cabbage Patch. She was also famous as the mother of actress Eleanor Robson Belmont, a leading star of Broadway who retired from the stage after marrying into the wealthy Belmont family. Eleanor lived to be 100 years old.

Cook was married twice, to Charles Robson who disappeared or deserted her in 1880 and to Augustus Cook whom she married in 1891 and who sued her for annulment of their marriage.

Cook died on September 20, 1933, aged 77, at the home of her daughter in Syosset, Long Island, New York.
