= Alice Hegan Rice =

American writer (1870–1942)

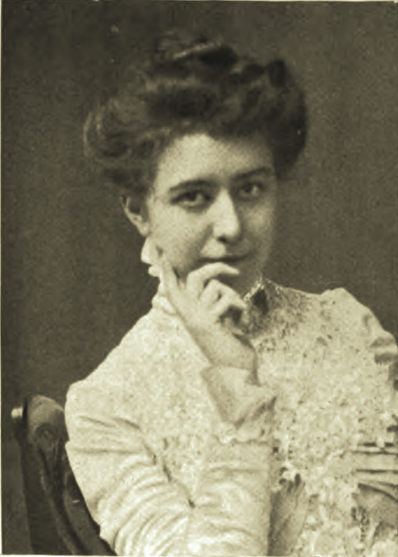
- 1915
- Born: Alice Caldwell Hegan; January 11, 1870; Shelbyville, Kentucky, U.S.
- Died: February 10, 1942 (aged 72); Louisville, Kentucky, U.S.
- Resting place: Cave Hill Cemetery; Louisville, Kentucky, U.S.
- Spouse: Cale Young Rice (m. 1902)

Alice Hegan Rice, also known as Alice Caldwell Hegan, (January 11, 1870 – February 10, 1942) was an American novelist. Her 1901 novel Mrs. Wiggs of the Cabbage Patch became a play and four films.

== Biography ==
Alice Caldwell Hegan was born on January 11, 1870, in Shelbyville, Kentucky, to Samuel Watson Hegan and Sallie P. Hegan. As a child, she would entertain her family members with creative stories that she came up with on the spot. When she was in school, writing was her strongest subject. She had a submission that was published by the newspaper at the age of 15.

Rice had a relatively privileged upbringing, but her views on life changed when she went to a mission for Sunday School that was in a slum in Louisville called the "Cabbage Patch". The mission was interrupted by a group of troublesome boys, but luckily Rice was able to defuse the situation by enticing them with a story she just read. For the rest of the mission she continued to tell them crazy stories about gangsters and pirates. This experience introduced her to the world of poverty and the underprivileged. She would later use this new-found knowledge to influence her most widely known novel, Mrs. Wiggs of the Cabbage Patch.

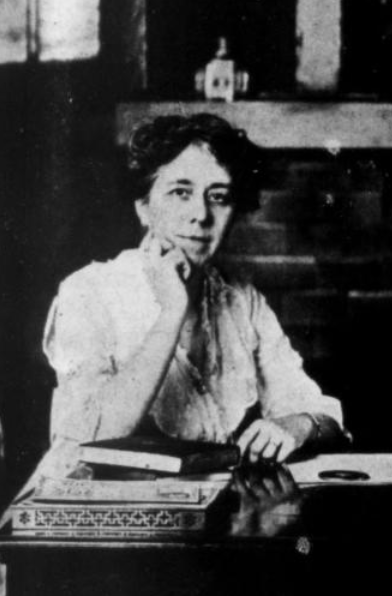
Alice Hegan Rice, from a 1918 publication

Several of Rice's earlier works were translated into German, French, Danish, and Swedish, and three (Mrs. Wiggs of the Cabbage Patch, Mr. Opp, and A Romance of Billy-Goat Hill) were dramatized. Alice married Cale Young Rice, a poet and playwright, on December 18, 1902. They spent most of their life traveling the world and becoming known in the literary scenes of New York and London. She later became a part of a social movement that would help improve the working and living conditions of the poor, which would bring her to helping found the Cabbage Patch Settlement House in Louisville in 1910. After living a life full of helping and writing about others, she died on February 10, 1942, at her home in Louisville, Kentucky. She was buried in Cave Hill Cemetery in Louisville.

== List of works ==
The following 20 books are attributed to Rice:

- Mrs. Wiggs of the Cabbage Patch (1901)
- Lovey Mary (1903)
- Sandy (1905)
- Captain June (1907)
- Mr. Opp (1909)
- A Romance of Billy-Goat Hill (1912)
- The Honorable Percival (1914)
- Calvary Alley (1917)
- Miss Mink's Soldier and Other Stories (1918)
- Turn About Tales (with Cale Young Rice) (1920)
- Quin (1921)
- Winners and Losers (with Cale Young Rice) (1925)
- The Buffer (1929)
- Mr. Pete & Co. (1933)
- The Lark Legacy (1935)
- Passionate Follies (1936)
- My Pillow Book (1937)
- Our Ernie (1939)
- The Inky Way (1940)
- Happiness Road (1942) (posthumous)

== Filmography ==
- Mrs. Wiggs of the Cabbage Patch (dir. Harold Entwistle, 1914)
- A Romance of Billy-Goat Hill (dir. Lynn Reynolds, 1916)
- Mr. Opp (dir. Lynn Reynolds, 1917)
- Sunshine Nan (dir. Charles Giblyn, 1918)
- Sandy (dir. George Melford, 1918)
- Mrs. Wiggs of the Cabbage Patch (dir. Hugh Ford, 1919)
- Lovey Mary (dir. King Baggot, 1926)
- Mrs. Wiggs of the Cabbage Patch (dir. Norman Taurog, 1934)
- Mrs. Wiggs of the Cabbage Patch (dir. Ralph Murphy, 1942)
