= Pauline Lord =

American actress (1890–1950)

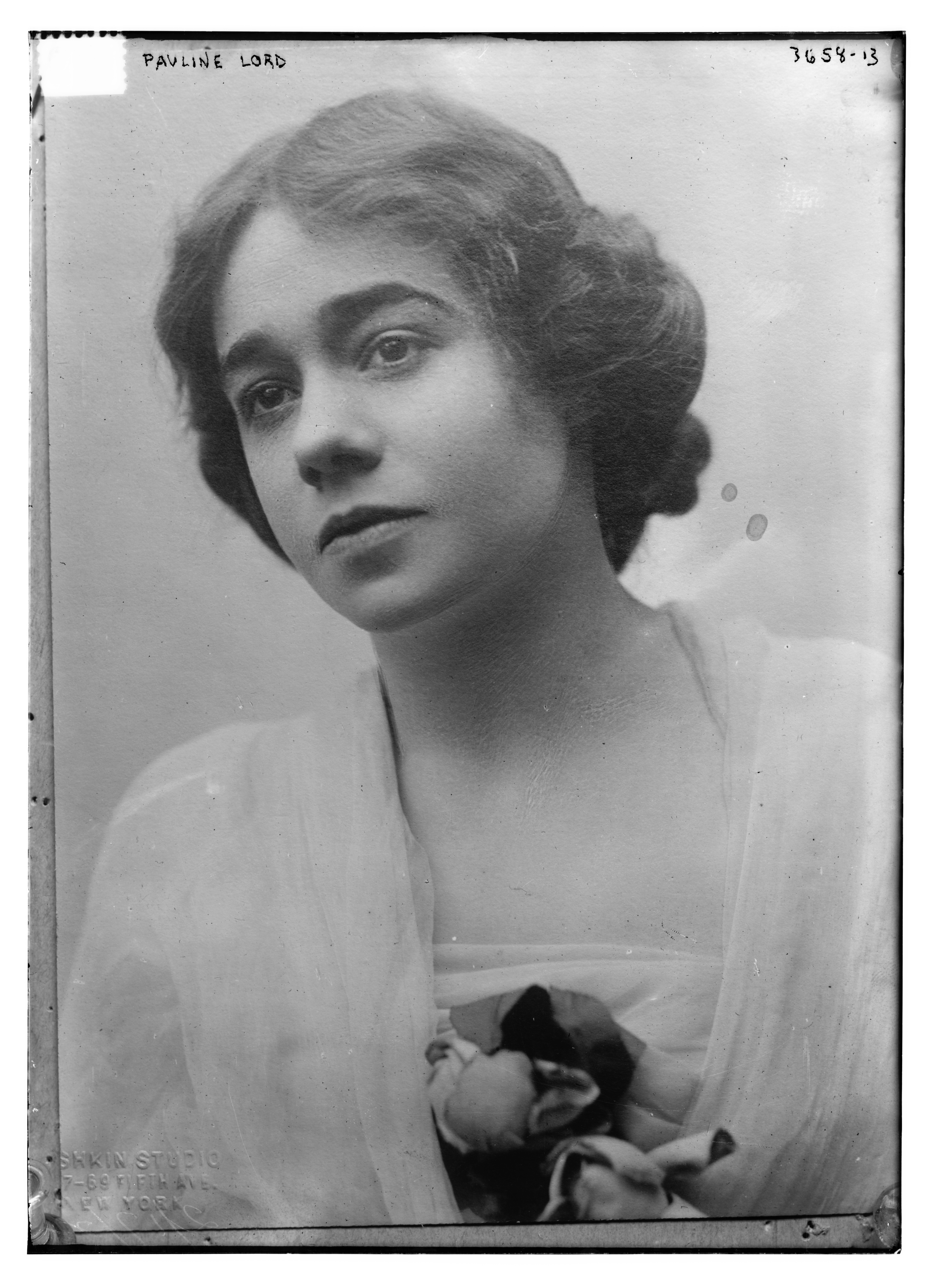
- Pauline Lord in 1915
- Born: August 13, 1890; Hanford, California, US
- Died: October 11, 1950 (aged 60); Alamogordo, New Mexico, US
- Occupations: Stage, film actress
- Years active: 1903–1946
- Spouse: Owen B. Winters (1929–1931)

Pauline Lord (August 13, 1890 – October 11, 1950) was an American stage and film actress.

== Early years ==
Lord was born in Hanford, California, to Edward Lord and Sara Foster. When the family moved to San Francisco she attended Holy Rosary Academy, where she discovered her vocation from participating in a school play. As a youngster, she used her weekly allowance to attend Saturday productions at the Alcazar Theatre in San Francisco and eventually gained small parts in some of those plays. She graduated from the Jennie Morrow Long College of Voice and Action.

== Career ==
At age 13, she debuted professionally with the Belasco Stock Company in the play Are You a Mason? where her first role was that of a maid. The comedian Nat Goodwin saw her act and invited her to look him up if she ever got to New York City. Three years later, after the San Francisco Fire, at the age of 16, she made the trip, and true to his words, Goodwin put her to work with several tour engagements. Fired from her first tour, she returned to New York and acted in some plays there before returning to California.

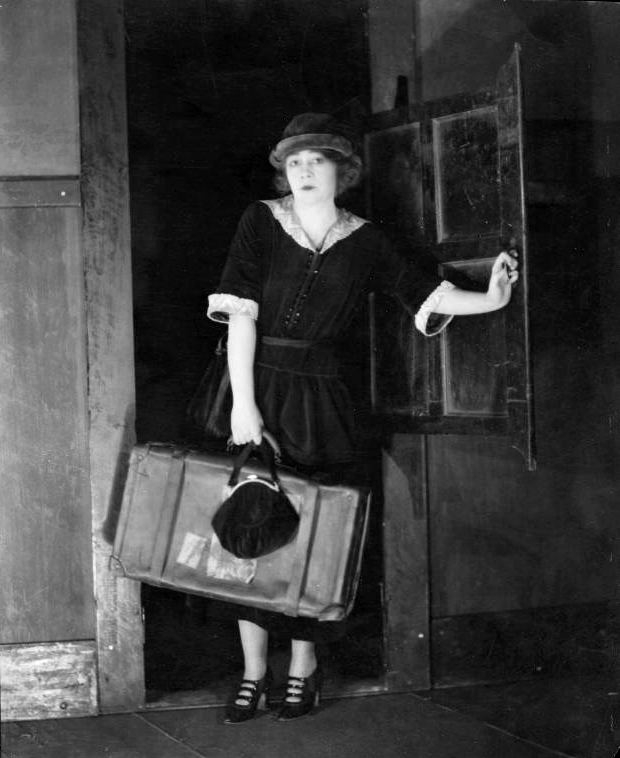
Pauline Lord created the title role in the original Broadway production of Anna Christie (1921)

Her first Broadway role was in January 1912 as Ruth Lenox in The Talker followed by more tours and vaudeville parts. Her next hit was in August 1917 as Sadie in The Deluge, directed by Arthur Hopkins. It was not until November 2, 1921, that she again scored another hit where she starred in the title role of Eugene O’Neill's Anna Christie at the Vanderbilt Theatre on Broadway. This turned out to be her greatest success; the play was taken to London, and at the Strand Theatre on April 10, 1923, she received a half-hour ovation. In 1924, she starred as Amy in Sidney Howard's They Knew What They Wanted and later in 1928 as Nina Leeds in O’Neill's Strange Interlude. Mary Pickford listed her as one of her favorite stars.

Lord returned to the stage in 1932 playing Abby in Sidney Howard's The Late Christopher Bean. She made her film debut in 1934 as Mrs. Wiggs of the Cabbage Patch, followed by A Feather in Her Hat, released the following year. She found she was not interested in cinema and returned to the stage. In January 1936, she played Zenobia in Owen and Donald Davis’ dramatization of Edith Wharton's Ethan Frome. Her last appearance on stage was in 1946 as Amanda in a touring company's production of Tennessee Williams' The Glass Menagerie.

Lord's work on radio included co-starring in "Ethan Frome", an episode of Theatre Guild on the Air on May 25, 1947.

== Personal life and death ==
Lord married advertising executive Owen B. Winters on April 27, 1929. They divorced on October 26, 1931.

She died on October 11, 1950, of chronic asthma and heart disease at Champion Memorial Hospital in Alamogordo, New Mexico.
