= Blanche Chapman =

American actress

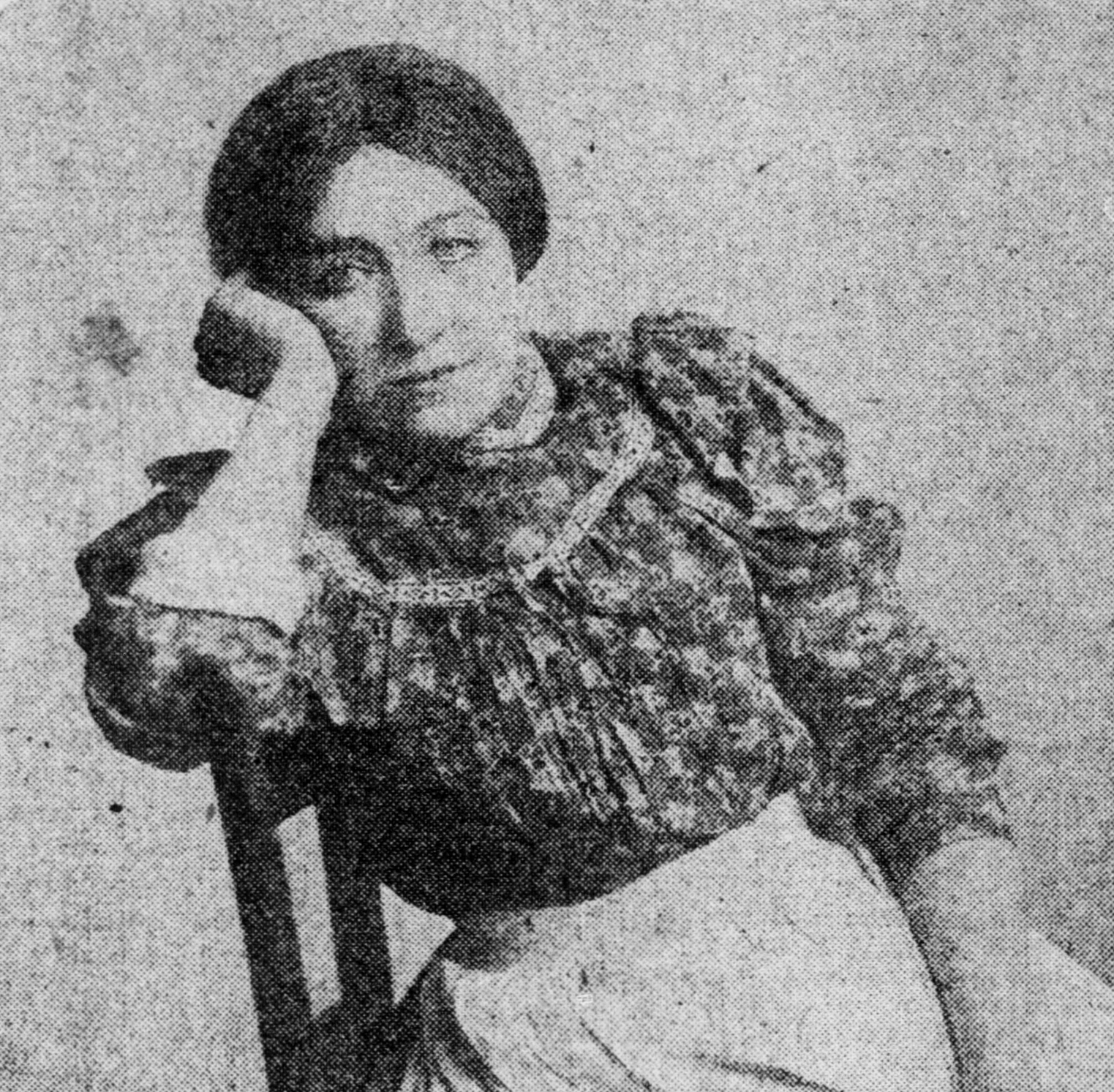
- Blanche Chapman as Mrs. Wiggs of the Cabbage Patch in 1909
- Born: November 1, 1851; Covington, Kentucky, U.S.
- Died: June 7, 1941 (aged 89); Rutherford, New Jersey, U.S.
- Occupation: Actress
- Spouse: Henry Clay Ford
- Children: Harry Chapman Ford

Blanche Chapman (November 1, 1851 – December 7, 1941) was an American actress. She starred in numerous Gilbert and Sullivan productions.

== Early life ==
Blanche Chapman was born in November 1851 in Covington, Kentucky. At age sixteen, she went to school at a convent. Her classmate was Marion Booth, who was related to John Wilkes Booth.

Chapman was raised in a theater family. Her great-great-grandfather was Thomas Chapman. Her grandfather, Samuel Chapman, was an actor in Covent Garden. He father brought a three-month old Chapman on stage during his performance in "Mr. and Mrs. Peter White." Her sister, Ella Chapman, was also an actress with whom she starred in works in theaters managed by John T. Ford.

== Career and life ==
Early in her career, she performed alongside Dion Boucicault, John T. Raymond, Edwin Booth, John McCullough, and Joseph Jefferson. In 1874, she and her sister performed as "The Beautiful Chapman Sisters" at the Metropolitan Theatre in San Francisco. It was during a performance at the theater, when David Belasco made his debut as a fill in for the sisters during a costume change.

In 1875, Chapman married Henry Clay Ford. He was the manager of the Lincoln Theatre. The couple had three children: playwright and novelist Harry Chapman Ford, drama teacher Frank Ford, and actor manager George Ford. George's wife was comedy actress Helen Ford. They lived in Logan Circle in Washington, D.C.

Chapman performed regularly in New York. In the early 20th-century, after Henry retired from the theater, the family moved to New York City, followed by Rutherford, New Jersey.

== Later life and death ==
In 1929, over a decade after Henry's death in 1915, Chapman requested the arm chair in which Abraham Lincoln was shot and killed, be returned to her from the Smithsonian Institution, where it was stored. Henry had purchased and installed the chair to provide Lincoln a more comfortable seat. She was returned the chair and within weeks, called Henry Ford to see if he wanted to buy the chair for his museum. He declined. In December 1929, she sold the chair at auction through the American Art Association for $2,400.

Chapman died in June 1941 at her home in Rutherford, New Jersey.
