= William Hodge =

American actor and playwright (1874–1932)

William T. Hodge
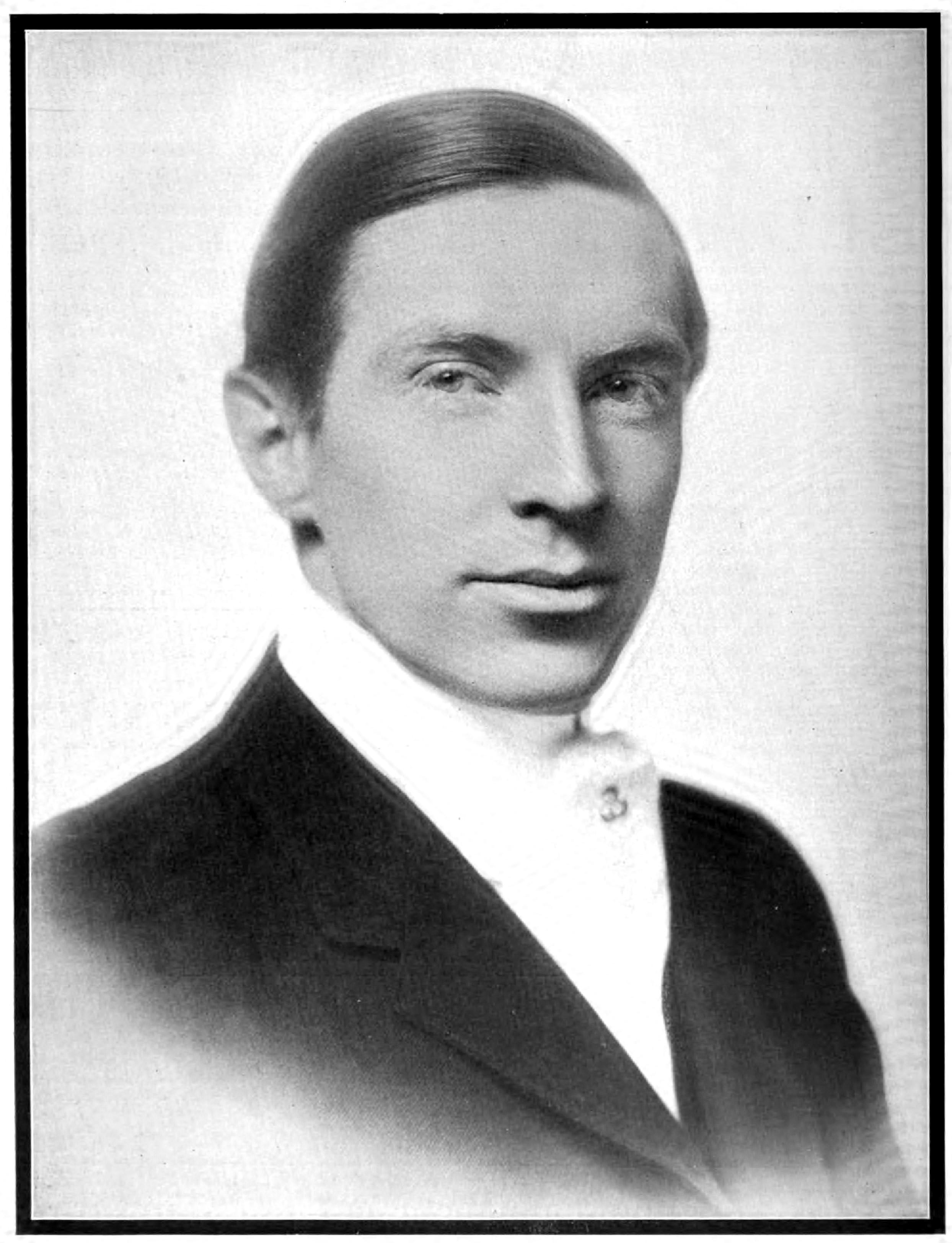
- William Hodge 1909
- Born: William Thomas Hodge; November 1, 1874; Albion, New York, U.S.
- Died: January 30, 1932 (aged 57); Greenwich, Connecticut, U.S.
- Other names: William T. Hodge; Lawrence Whitman
- Occupations: Actor, playwright, producer
- Years active: 1899–1930
- Known for: The Man from Home
- Spouse: Helen Perley Cogswell (m. 1909–1932)
- Children: 3

William Thomas Hodge (November 1, 1874 – January 30, 1932) was an American actor, playwright, and theatrical producer.

Active on stage from his late teens, he began performing on Broadway in 1899 with A Reign of Error and Sag Harbor, appeared in the hits Mrs. Wiggs of the Cabbage Patch (1903) and Dream City (1906), and became a star with The Man from Home (1908), which ran for over a year on Broadway, and which he took on the road for four seasons. From 1913 on, he wrote his own plays, at first using the name Lawrence Whitman, which he abandoned after 1918. The most successful of these was For All of Us (1923), which ran for over 200 performances on Broadway. He was a proponent of touring, having his own "William Hodge public" that would attend his plays around the country. His last performances were with his own work, The Old Rascal, in 1930.

== Early years ==
He was born on November 1, 1874, in Albion, New York. His parents were Irish immigrants Thomas Hodge and Mary Anderson. William Hodge was the third of four children. His father was first a teamster, then a stone mason.

Hodge attended public schools in Albion, and later joined as a property man the same theatrical company as his older brother Joseph.

== Career ==
=== Broadway beginnings ===
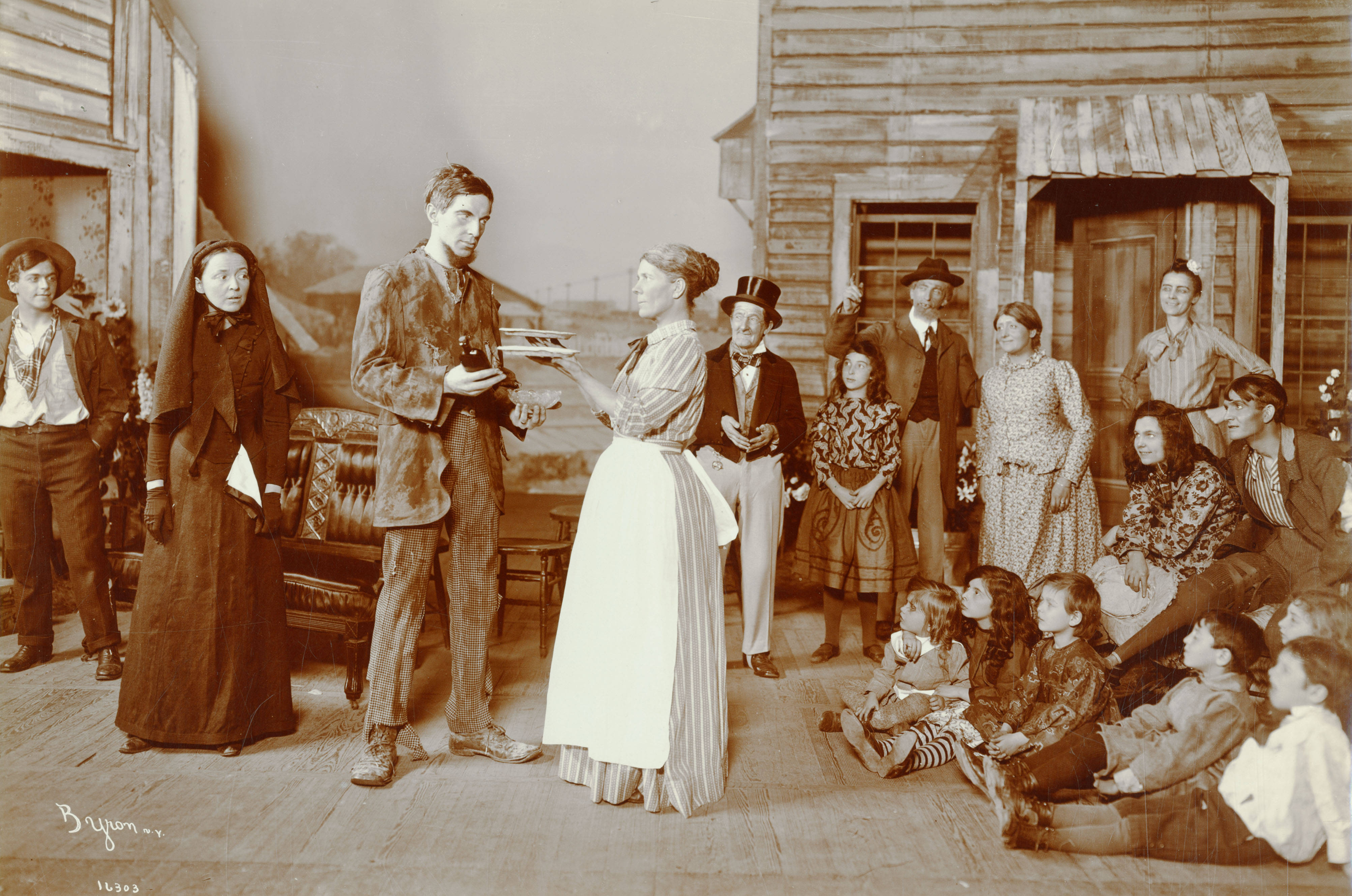
Helen Lowell, Hodge, Madge Carr Cook

Hodge first performed on Broadway during spring 1899 as a Brazilian heavy in a musical comedy called A Reign of Error. Though he was a bit player, "a thirty-five dollar a week man", James A. Herne noticed Hodge in this Rogers Brothers comedy. Herne wanted him for his new play, Sag Harbor, but as he was under contract to Klaw and Erlanger, Herne's producer-manager George C. Tyler persuaded Abe Erlanger to loan out Hodge. Tyler said it mystified Erlanger as to why the fuss over a bit player, but Herne's instinct was sound. Hodge proved to be very popular in Sag Harbor, The New York Times reviewer calling his performance "the best in the piece".

After touring in Sag Harbor and doing two short-lived Broadway plays, George C. Tyler again cast Hodge in Mrs. Wiggs of the Cabbage Patch. He played a character named Stubbins, a mail-order groom and souse who turned into a lucrative catch for the spinster Miss Hazy (Helen Lowell). This character role was popular with audiences, if not critics, and Hodge was in the production, on Broadway and touring, from 1903 to 1905. Hodge then played in a musical, and a successful operetta, Dream City, through 1907.

=== The Man from Home ===
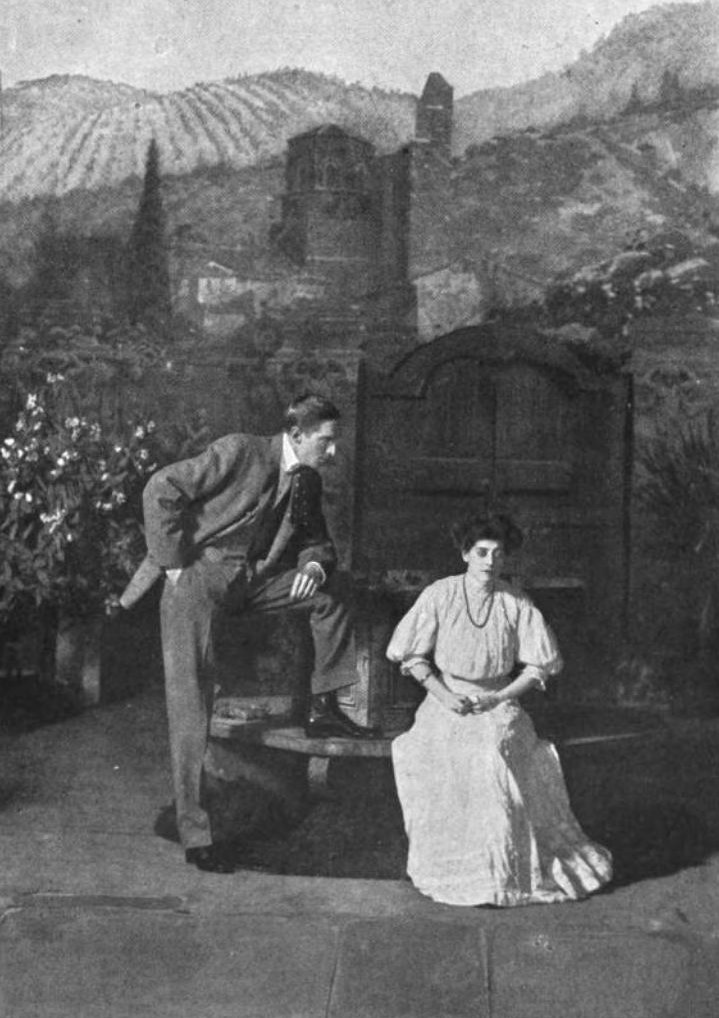
Hodge and Olive Wyndham

Booth Tarkington and Harry Leon Wilson wrote The Man from Home while visiting Europe in 1907. Wilson told producer George C. Tyler that the lead character was built around Hodge playing it. Hodge had been hoping for a starring role, and so accepted Tyler's offer to play the part. (Note: Tarkington had an ulterior motive for this casting. The play's central character, a Kokomo, Indiana, attorney named Daniel Pike, was based on Tarkington's rival, George Ade, who had once parodied Tarkington in a play. Hodge bore a marked resemblance to Ade, a connection obvious to audiences of the time.) With The Man from Home, Hodge finally had an appealing leading part to play rather than a quirky supporting character.

For its initial run in Chicago, The Man from Home set a dramatic record of 316 performances during 1907–1908. It premiered on Broadway during August 1908 and ran through November 1909 for nearly 500 performances, before starting a national tour. Hodge enjoyed playing on the road, saying he regarded Broadway as no different than Ann Arbor or Schenectady. His road appeal gave rise to the Broadway term "The William Hodge public", meaning his performances were sure to draw anywhere in the country, regardless of how they played in New York.

While still performing on Broadway in The Man from Home and living at The Lambs Club, Hodge married Helen Perley Cogswell in June 1909. She was an actress under the stage name Helen Hale, who performed on Broadway from 1901 through 1909.

=== Playwright ===
Hodge's early successes on stage had been under the auspices of George C. Tyler's management for Liebler & Company. However, in January 1913, Hodge signed with Lee Shubert for a play called The Road to Happiness, by Lawrence Whitman. "Lawrence Whitman" was a nom de plume for Hodge himself. Hodge performed in this to great success on the road, though when it finally went to Broadway in 1915, it lasted only a month.

Shubert bought two more plays by Lawrence Whitman. The New York Times called Fixing Sister (1916) a faint but amusing copy of The Man from Home, and openly stated it was Hodge's own work. A Cure for Curables (1918) had Earl Derr Biggers as the primary co-author. It was a comedy set in a sanitarium, with Hodge as a physician charged to cure ten patients in as many days.

By 1919, Hodge had abandoned the alias, selling The Guest of Honor to Shubert under his own name. Alexander Woollcott wondered why Hodge bothered bringing his plays to New York when they were already so successful on the road, which was the point of playing on Broadway. He thought serious playgoers would regard it "as a pretty terrible piece of bosh", "the kind of play in which a child is referred to as a tot". Heywood Broun concurred, calling it "one of those tot plays", and saying "it was exactly the same bag of tricks which he has unpacked before on many occasions".

Beware of Dogs (1921) has Hodge as a Greenwich, Connecticut, kennel owner much put upon by his charges and their owners, who eventually unloads on them all. It was a more satirical role than he usually played. It reached its 100th performance on December 14, 1921, but closed three nights later.

The most successful of plays Hodge wrote, at least by Broadway standards of longevity, was For All of Us, which premiered in October 1923. This work was pure sentiment, with Hodge playing an Irish laborer, incarcerated in Sing Sing, who has been redeemed through the gift of a bible. Moving between several Shubert-owned venues in the theater district, For All of Us reached its 200th performance in early April 1924, closing two weeks later.

=== Producer ===
Since 1913, Lee Shubert had produced Hodge's plays. The Judge's Husband, which Hodge wrote, staged, and starred in would be the last time for this sponsorship. The play was a three-act farce, in which a rural Connecticut judge (Gladys Hanson) is forced to preside over her own divorce from her attorney husband (Hodge). A reviewer, noting Hodge's dedicated fan base, suggested it would last on Broadway only as long as people wanted to see the actor Hodge, for the playwright had let the audience down. There was demand enough for Hodge the actor that the play ran over three months, through January 1, 1927.

Hodge produced his own next play, Straight Through the Door (1928), but left the direction to Maurice Barrett. It was a mystery comedy, in which Hodge plays an actor suspected of murder, who exposes the real villain at the end. Critic Rowland Field said it was not a good play, and the acting support was weak, but thought Hodge's "loyal followers" would be pleased.

Inspector Kennedy (1929) was the only play Hodge performed in after 1913 that he did not write. Milton Herbert Gropper and Edna Sherry did a fair job writing the play, according to Burns Mantle, who also felt the supporting performers were not very good, save for Henry Herbert. It ended a month later, and Hodge quickly produced another work, The Old Rascal, at the same venue, as it turned out, his final play and performance. Maurice Barrett again directed, with Hodge playing a wealthy old judge from California who outwits "city slickers" trying out a badger game on him. It closed on Broadway after two months,.

== Death ==
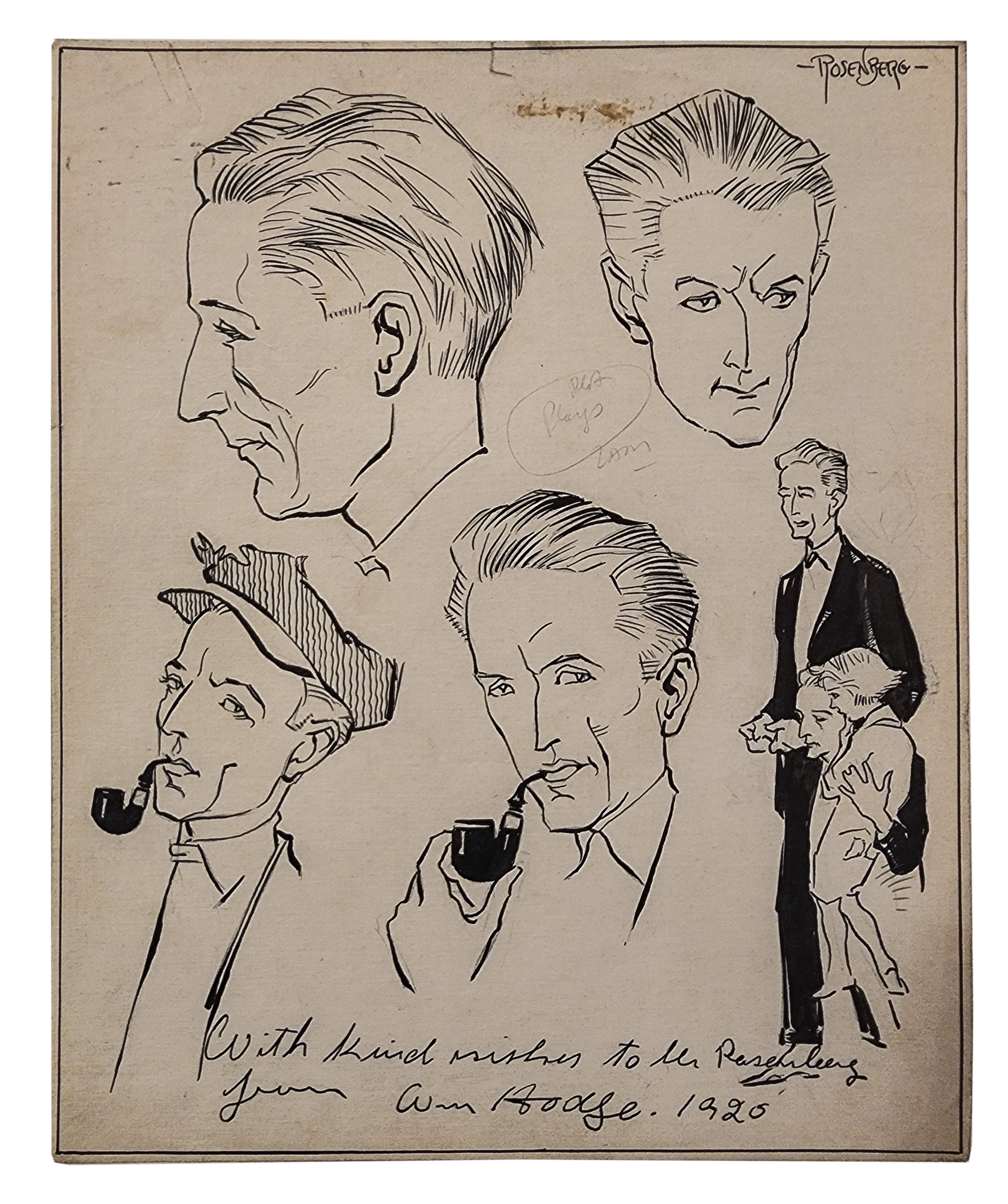
William Hodge by Manuel Rosenberg 1920

Hodge had been sick for three days before he died of lobar pneumonia at his home in the Round Hill community of Greenwich, Connecticut, on January 30, 1932. He was survived by his wife Helen Cogswell Hodge; his daughters, Genevieve Hodge Law and Martha Hodge; and son, William Hodge Jr. A simple service was held at his home the next day, and his body was then cremated.

== Plays ==
- The Road to Happiness (1912) – written as Lawrence Whitman
- Fixing Sister (1916) – written as Lawrence Whitman
- A Cure for Curables (1918) – written as Lawrence Whitman with Earl Derr Biggers, from a short story by Corra Harris
- The Guest of Honor (1919)
- Beware of Dogs (1921)
- For All of Us (1923)
- The Judge's Husband (1926)
- Straight Through the Door (1928)
- The Old Rascal (1930)

== Stage credits ==
Stage performances by year of Hodge's first involvement.
Year	Play	Role	Venue	Notes/Sources
1899	Heart of Chicago		People's Theatre	The New York Times said this was his New York, but not Broadway, debut, though a typo gave the year as 1889.
1899	A Reign of Error	(Bit player)	New Victoria Theatre	Hodge had an uncredited bit part as a Brazilian "heavy".
1899	Sag Harbor	Freeman Whitmarsh	Touring company Theatre Republic	His supporting character, a gossipy tradesman, was praised by critics.
1901	Up York State	Lem Yarrington	Fourteenth Street Theatre	Playwrights David Higgins and Georgia Waldron were the leads, Hodge a supporting Adirondack rustic.
1902	Sky Farm	Stephen Tully	Garrick Theatre	Rustic melodrama by Edward E. Kidder had Hodge as a country type in love.
1903	Mrs. Wiggs of the Cabbage Patch	Hiram Stubbins	Touring company Savoy Theatre	
1905	The White Cat	Jonah the Thirteenth	New Amsterdam Theatre	A dull musical fantasy; a critic said Hodge should hurry away "for his professional health".
1906	Dream City	Seth Hubbs	Weber's Music Hall	Joe Weber wrestles Hodge to see if "he has a whole shirt on his back".
1907	The Man from Home	Daniel Voorhees Pike	Touring company Astor Theatre	After the Broadway run finished in 1909, Hodge spent four years touring with this play.
1913	The Road to Happiness	Jim Whitman (Note: His character name suggests Hodge was not too secretive about his playwriting alias.)	Touring company Shubert Theatre	The first play Hodge wrote as Lawrence Whitman was a sentimental melodrama.
1916	Fixing Sister	John Otis	Touring company Maxine Elliott's Theatre	The New York Times said Hodge was the whole play.
1918	A Cure for Curables	Dr. James Pendergrass	Touring company 39th Street Theatre	Four-act comic melodrama co-written by Earl Derr Biggers and Hodge.
1919	The Guest of Honor	John Weatherbee	Touring company Broadhurst Theatre	Hodge toured in this for a year before bringing it to Broadway in 1920.
1921	Beware of Dogs	George Oliver	Touring company Broadhurst Theatre; 39th Street Theatre	Three-act satirical comedy has Hodge as a kennel owner.
1923	For All of Us	Tom Griswold	Touring company 49th Street Theatre; Ambassador Theatre; Lyric Theatre	
1926	The Judge's Husband	Joe Kirby	Touring company 49th Street Theatre	
1928	Straight Through the Door	Eugene Thomas	Touring company 49th Street Theatre	Hodge produced as well as wrote this murder mystery.
1929	Inspector Kennedy	Inspector Kennedy	Touring company Bijou Theatre	Three-act mystery had Hodge playing a professional detective.
1930	The Old Rascal	Joe Adams	Touring company Bijou Theatre	Hodge, famous for "clean" plays, had a badger game bedroom scene in his final work.

== Bibliography ==
- George C. Tyler and J. C. Furnas. Whatever Goes Up. Bobbs Merrill, 1934.
