= The Man from Home (play) =

1907 play by Booth Tarkington and Harry leon Wilson

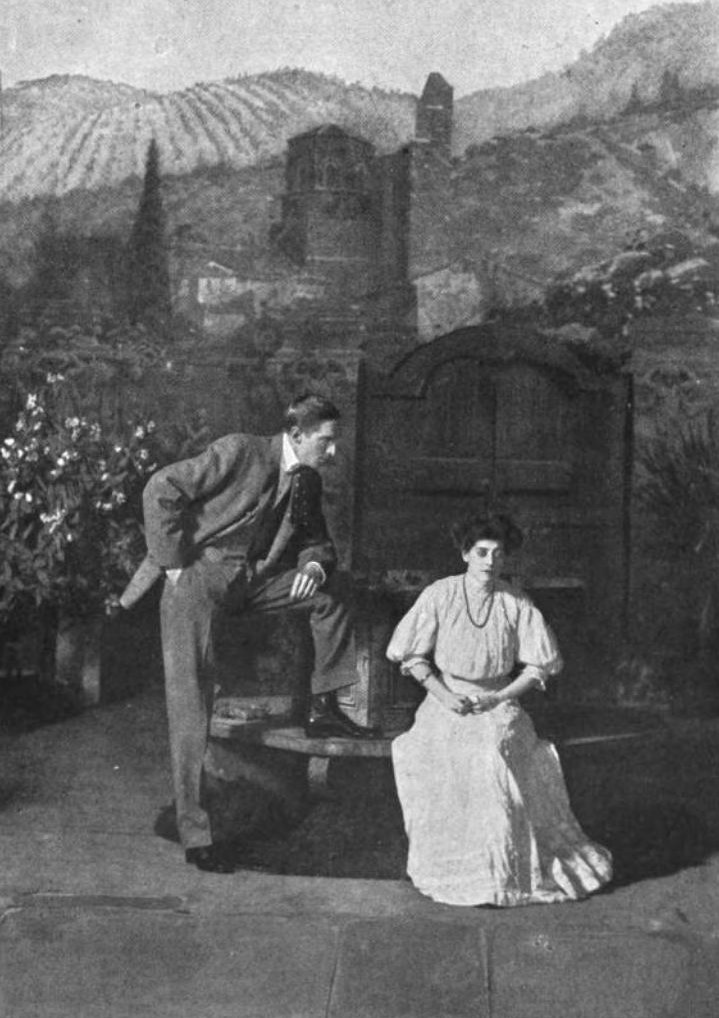
- William Hodge and Olive Wyndham
- Original language: English
- Written by: Booth Tarkington and Harry Leon Wilson
- Subject: Indiana lawyer resolves problems abroad.
- Genre: Comedy
- Setting: Hotel Regina Margherita in Sorrento, Italy

Premiere
- Date: August 17, 1908
- Place: Astor Theatre
- Directed by: Hugh Ford

The Man from Home is a 1907 play written by Booth Tarkington and Harry Leon Wilson. It is a comedy with four acts, three settings, and moderate pacing. The story concerns an Indiana lawyer who has travelled to Italy to save his ward from an ill-conceived marriage. The action of the play all takes place within 24 hours.

The play was first produced by Liebler & Company, staged by Hugh Ford, with settings by Gates and Morange, and starring William T. Hodge. After a tryout in Louisville, Kentucky, it opened in Chicago during September 1907, where it played for 36 weeks, setting a record for a dramatic production with 316 performances. It premiered on Broadway during August 1908, and ran through to November 1909 for nearly 500 performances.

The play was later adapted for silent films of the same title in 1914 and 1922.

== Characters ==
Characters are listed in order of appearance within their scope.

Lead

- Ethel Granger-Simpson is 20, a pretty young heiress from Kokomo, who has been in Europe for ten years. (Note: The play makes explicit that Granger is the middle name for both Ethel and Hoarce. They turned it into a "double-barrelled" surname as an affectation.)
- Daniel Voorhees Pike is 35, an attorney from Kokomo, Indiana, legal guardian of Ethel Simpson.

Supporting

- The Earl of Hawcastle is 56, a distinguished and well-spoken, but dishonest, English aristocrat.
- Comtesse de Champigny is 32, stylish, called Hélène by her secret paramour the Earl, in pursuit of Hoarce's money.
- Hon. Almeric St. Aubyn is 25, the handsome if vacuous son of the Earl, just affianced to Ethel.
- Horace Granger-Simpson is 22, older brother to Ethel, naive and enamored of the Comtesse de Champigny. (Note: He was also under Pike's financial guardianship but is now his own master.)
- Lady Victoria Creech is 60, snobbish, slightly deaf, sister-in-law to the Earl, an odd mix of chaperone and procuress.
- Grand Duke Vasili Vasiliovitch is 45, travelling incognito as Herr von Gröllerhagen, whom Pike calls "Doc". (Note: The Grand Duke, who sports a full beard and has a military air about him, often forgets that he is supposed to be German.)
- Ivanoff is 38, an escaped Russian political prisoner; a constitutionalist, not an anarchist.

Featured

- Mariano is Maître d'hôtel at Hotel Regina Margherita, stout and middle-aged, and a polyglot.
- Michele is a young waiter at the hotel, who also speaks several languages.
- Ribiere is the Grand Duke's secretary, a trim and dapper young Frenchman, worried about anarchists.
- First Carabiniere is an Italian military policeman, seeking Ivanoff.

Bit Players

- Mandolin Players (2)
- Guitarist
- Valet De Chambre
- Second Carabiniere
- Third Carabiniere
- Fishermen
- Beggars
- Porters

== Synopsis ==
At intervals throughout the play the mandolins and guitarist are heard playing The Fishermen's Song, usually off stage. During the opening of Act III an unseen orchestra softly plays an aria from Pagliacci, the music coming through the open doors of the conservatory at the rear of the salon.

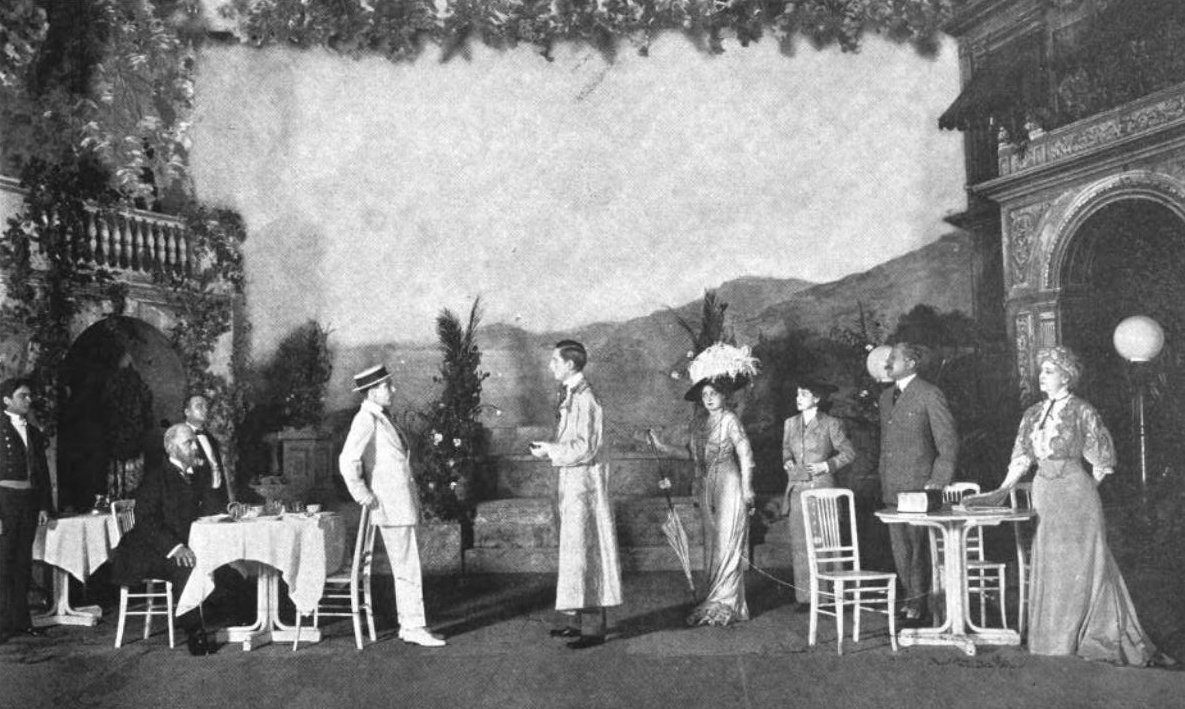

Act I (The terrace of the Hotel Regina Margherita in Sorrento. Morning.) Exposition between Mariano and Ribiere identifies the main characters and their relationships. The Earl, his son, Lady Creech, Ethel, Hoarce, and Hélène form one party. The Grand Duke has met Pike at a hotel in Naples and is bringing him along to Sorrento. Hawcastle and Hélène discuss their latest venture, the capture of Ethel and Hoarce's money through promised matrimony. News of an escaped Russian convict alarms Hélène, but Hawcastle assures her it cannot be Ivanoff. Almeric confirms Ethel has accepted him. Hawcastle tells Hoarce the "settlement" will be £150,000. Hoarce acquiesces in order to appear worldly, though this is Ethel's entire estate. Mariano explains a commotion from the village is the arrival of Herr von Gröllerhagen (Note: Mariano and Ribiere know his real identity, but no else does.) and his American friend. The Earl's party dismiss the German as common and the American as gauche. Ethel and Hoarce are embarrassed by their countryman, and horrified to learn he is Ethel's guardian. Pike, in turn, is astonished at the settlement and Ethel's choice of fiancé. (Curtain)

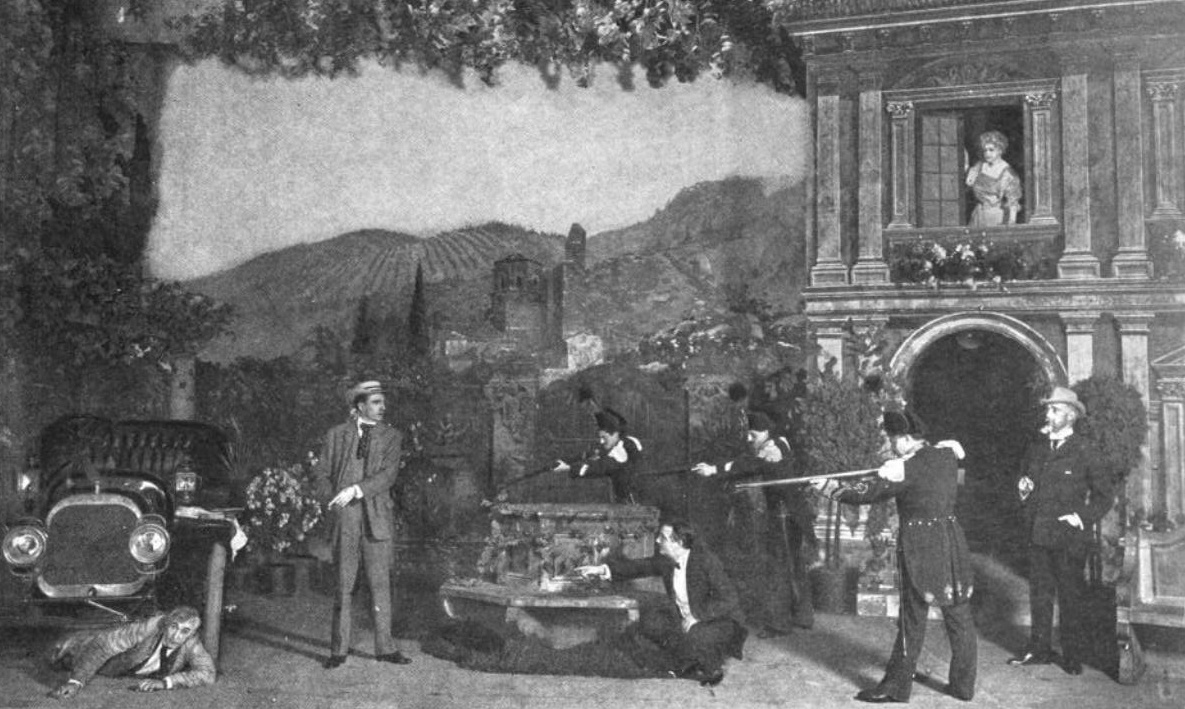

Act II (The hotel's entrance garden. Afternoon.) Pike, working on the engine of Doc's auto, ignores Hoarce's protests. Pike has refused to discuss a settlement with Hawcastle. Pike sends Doc for some clean rags, which amuses him. Lady Creech is seen peering out a second story window, spying on Pike. Ivanoff appears on the garden wall and begs Pike's help. With the reluctant help of Doc, Pike is able to convince the carabinieri that Ivanoff is a chauffeur. Mariano expedites matters by secretly revealing Doc's real identity to the carabinieri. Ivanoff tells his story to Pike and Doc. (Note: He was a professor of languages ten years ago in St. Petersburg, but was betrayed by his young French wife and an English friend named Glenwood. They stole government money he was holding for a political group and shopped Ivanoff to the Tsarist police. Recently he escaped Russia and made his way to Italy, searching for his betrayers.) Doc allows Ivanoff to stay in his suite of rooms, but is troubled. Lady Creech steals away to tell Hawcastle what she has seen. Pike and Ethel argue about the settlement. A letter from England that Pike hoped would dissuade her fizzles out but does let Ethel know Pike is fond of her. Hawcastle now confronts Pike: approve the settlement or face Italian justice for aiding a fugitive. (Curtain)

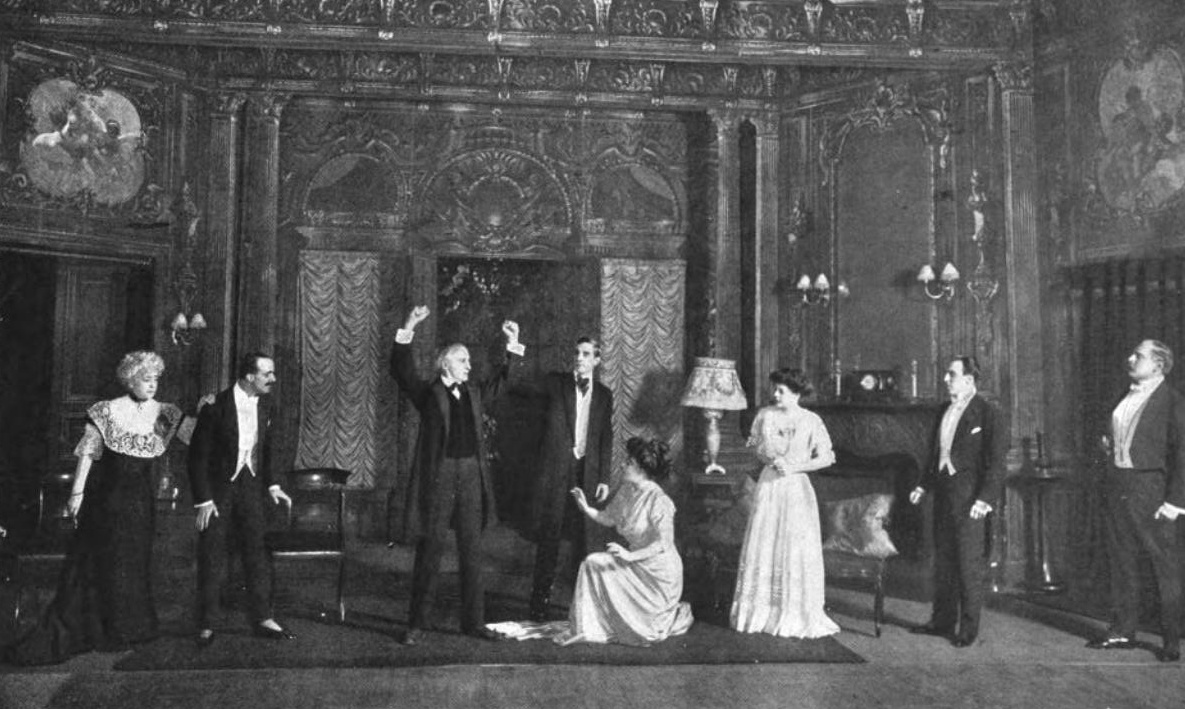

Act III (A private salon in the hotel. Evening.) Pike discusses the situation with Doc about Ivanoff and Hawcastle's threat. He apologises for getting him into this situation. Doc is unconcerned; he has already had Ribiere take steps about which he doesn't tell Pike yet. Pike calls Ivanoff into the room to give him the situation. Doc leaves on an errand of his own outside. Ivanoff notices his silver cigarette box and vodka bottle and realizes Doc is really Russian. He and Pike look out the window to see Doc speaking with the carabinieri, who salute him. Ivanoff panics, but Mariano enters to announce Lady Creech. Pike dismisses Ivanoff, but Lady Creech isn't fooled. She repeats Hawcastle's threat, but Pike has a sudden epiphany about the Earl, Hélène, and Ivanoff. He summons Ethel to the salon, and commands her to stay no matter what. Ethel agrees, and when her brother, the English party and the Cometesse arrive, she resists their demands to leave. Pike forces Hawcastle to repeat his threat in front of Ethel. He then summons Ivanoff, who recognizes his wife and Glenwood in Hélène and the Earl. Hélène is terrified of her husband and Hawcastle alarmed. He urges Almeric to go for the police, but Doc enters and announces the carabinieri have been dismissed. When Hawcastle challenges him, Ribiere identifies Doc as the Grand Duke Vasili, who has arranged a pardon for Ivanoff. Pike is stymied when Ethel still stands by Almeric; she has given her promise. (Curtain)

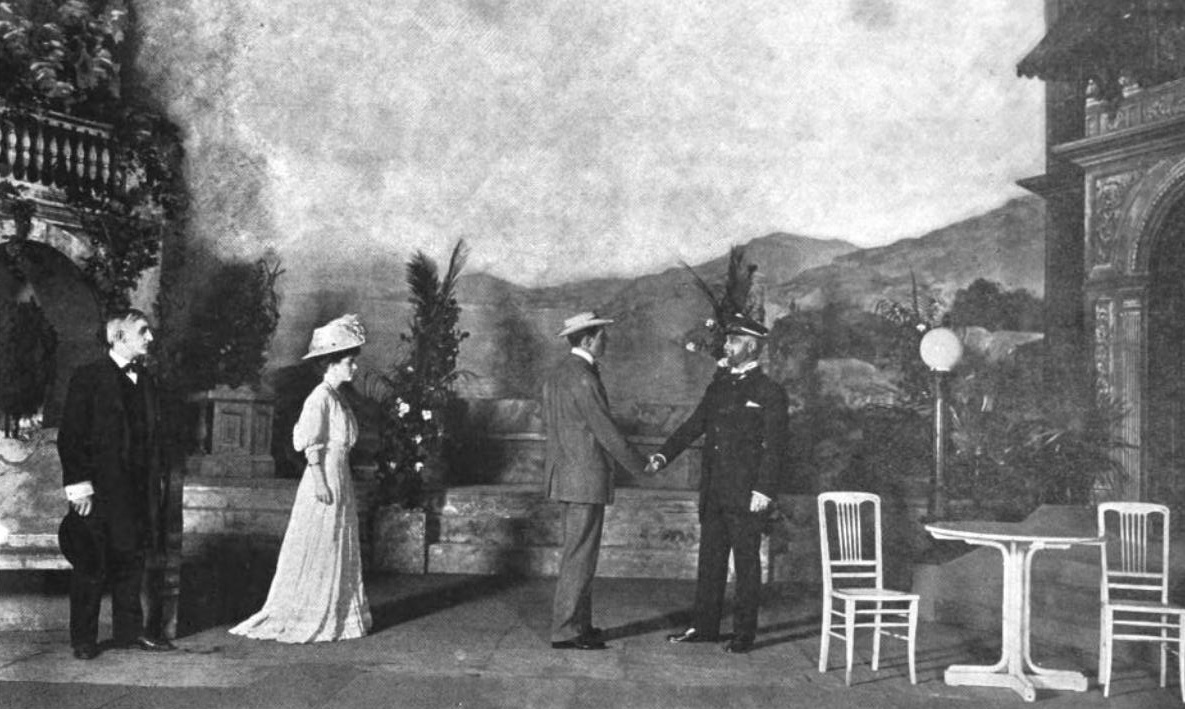

Act IV (Same as Act I. Morning.) Hélène has already gone. Hawcastle urges Almeric to keep after Ethel, as he prepares to flee in fear of a now free Ivanoff. Lady Creech reveals Ethel has wept upon hearing Ivanoff's tale. Ethel also had Pike give Ivanoff a large sum of money. As porters load his carriage, Hawcastle rushes out. Grand Duke Vasili now takes his leave of Ethel and Pike, praising the latter and signaling to the girl he knows where her heart is drifting. Ivanoff then comes to thank Ethel; he will go to London to teach languages and serve as a reproach to Hawcastle. As Ethel is still determined to honor her promise, Pike grants her request for the settlement. Hoarce is angry, but Ethel seems happy. However, Almeric blights it all by congratulating Ethel for "buying off the convict". She repudiates her promise on his opinion of her venality. Most of all she is angry with Pike for acquiescing now, and not earlier. But as she berates him, she realizes he has acknowledged her right to choose the life she wants. Slowly she enters the hotel, and soon the sound of her playing the piano and singing Sweet Genevieve, Pike's favorite song, drifts through the open door. Pike is staggered, then as a man in a dream, goes towards the music. (Curtain)

== Original production ==
=== Background ===
Liebler & Company was a partnership between investor T. A. Liebler and producer-manager George C. Tyler. They had first employed William T. Hodge in Sag Harbor (1899). He had been discovered by James Herne as a bit player in a Rogers Brothers' musical comedy, "a thirty-five dollar a week man". Liebler & Company next used him in Mrs. Wiggs of the Cabbage Patch (1903), their most successful play. Hodge left Liebler because he wanted a star role; he was with the Joe Weber company when Wilson told Tyler that The Man from Home was built on Hodge playing the lead. Tyler and Wilson were then (May 1907) touring North Africa by motorcar, so Tyler cabled Hodge in America to offer him the part, which he accepted.

Tyler returned to America during July, while Tarkington and Wilson returned in August on board the liner Nieuw Amsterdam. Tarkington had spent the last two years in Europe, mostly in Paris but also on Capri where he owned a home. His observations of fellow Americans over there had led to this play, according to his public statements. However, another motivation was suggested by an article in The New York Times, in which Tarkington contrived to put his Indiana rival George Ade on display in the character of Daniel Pike. The article quoted Tarkington when pressed on the question: "I do not admit that I have any quarrel with George Ade. I will say, however, that he did put me in a play, and I do not mind saying that I may have nursed the hope of revenge at some future time".

=== Cast ===
Principals only for tryouts, Chicago opening, and the Broadway run. Production on hiatus from June 15 through August 16, 1908, and from June 26, 1909, through August 15, 1909.
Role	Actor	Dates	Notes and sources
Ethel Granger-Simpson	Olive Wyndham	Sep 23, 1907 - Jun 26, 1909	
Ethel Granger-Simpson	Madeline Louis	Aug 16, 1909 - Nov 06, 1909	
Daniel Vorhees Pike	William T. Hodge	Sep 23, 1907 - Jun 14, 1909	Hodge took a break to marry actress Helen Hale.
Daniel Vorhees Pike	Henry Hall	Jun 15, 1909 - Jun 26, 1909	Hall took on the role for a short while so Hodge could have a vacation.
Daniel Vorhees Pike	William T. Hodge	Aug 16, 1909 - Nov 06, 1909	
Earl of Hawcastle	E. J. Ratcliffe	Sep 23, 1907 - May 11, 1908	
Earl of Hawcastle	John Glendinning	May 12, 1908 - Oct ??, 1908	Glendinning, often misspelled "Glendenning", was husband to Jessie Millward.
Earl of Hawcastle	Herbert McKenzie	Oct ??, 1908 - Nov 06, 1909	
Comtesse De Champigny	Alice Johnson	Sep 23, 1907 - Nov 06, 1909	
Hon. Almeric St. Aubyn	Echlin P. Gayer	Sep 23, 1907 - Nov 06, 1909	
Hoarce Granger-Simpson	Hassard Short	Sep 23, 1907 - May 15, 1909	
Hoarce Granger-Simpson	George Le Guere	May 17, 1909 - Nov 06, 1909	
Lady Creech	Ida Vernon	Sep 23, 1907 - Nov 06, 1909	Vernon's first stage performance occurred in April 1856 when she was 12.
Grand Duke Vasili	Eben Plympton	Sep 23, 1907 - Jan 29, 1908	Plympton was dissatisfied with the role, which one critic had said was too small for his talents.
Grand Duke Vasili	Eugene McGillan	Jan 30, 1908 - Feb 01, 1908	McGillen was the understudy for male roles, while Alma Belwin understudied the female cast.
Grand Duke Vasili	Henry Jewett	Feb 03, 1908 - Nov 06, 1909	Jewett had been playing in one of Liebler's road companies for The Squaw Man.
Ivanoff	Harry Harmon	Sep 23, 1907 - Nov 06, 1909	
Mariano	Anthony Asher	Sep 23, 1907 - Nov 06, 1909	
Michele	Antonio Salerno	Sep 23, 1907 - Nov 06, 1909	
Ribiere	Harry L. Lang	Sep 23, 1907 - Jun 26, 1909	
Ribiere	Louis P. Verande	Aug 16, 1909 - Sep ??, 1909	
Ribiere	George Rizard	Sep ??, 1909 - Nov 06, 1909	
First Carabiniere	A. Montegriffo	Sep 23, 1907 - Nov 06, 1909	

=== Tryouts and Chicago opening ===
The Man from Home had its first tryout performance at Macauley's Theatre in Louisville on September 23, 1907. The reviewer for The Courier Journal said the play was much more than a vehicle for William Hodge, was sure to be a success, and noted how the character Daniel Voorhees Pike "suggests George Ade types". After three days in Louisville, the production did one-night performances in Dayton and Columbus, Ohio. It then moved to the Studebaker Theater in Chicago, where it had an unusual Sunday opening on September 29, 1907. The critic for the Chicago Tribune said: "The Man from Home will be a popular success-- a big one", but doubted it would play well in England. They identified the reason for the play's domestic popularity as "we have our merits put up against the foreigner's shortcomings and our national pride being tickled, our vanity flattered". The acting of William Hodge and Olive Wyndham were praised, the latter being said to have "the happy ability to stand still and yet express emotion".

Prior scheduling at the Studebaker forced The Man from Home to vacate after 109 performances on December 21, 1907. Foreseeing this, Liebler & Company bought the managerial lease for the Chicago Opera House from Kohl & Castle, who had used it for vaudeville. The Man from Home then opened there for its 110th performance on December 23, 1907. Daily newspaper ads for the play now carried the number of each performance with the proclamation "Longest Dramatic Run in Chicago's History".

By May 31, 1908, when The Man from Home finally closed at the Chicago Opera House, it had been performed 316 times. Following two weeks in Minneapolis-St. Paul, the production went on hiatus starting June 15, 1908 until the New York premiere.

=== Broadway premiere ===
The Man from Home had its Broadway premiere on August 17, 1908, at the Astor Theatre. The reviewer for The Standard Union noted "an unusually large audience of first-nighters" despite "oppresive heat" had "heartily endorsed the production and pronounced it a fine success". The critic for The Sun said that "Broadway accepts the verdict rendered in Chicago last winter. The play is distinctly worth while. Both it and the new star made a big audience laugh almost constantly for three hours, display an unusual amount of enthusiasm despite the heat and predict a longer run for the piece here than it had in the Windy City".

The New York Times reviewer thought the play a success even if built on an old pattern, of a native type in foreign surroundings. They esteemed the performance of William Hodge, and Henry Jewett as the Grand Duke, while finding Echlin P. Gayer's Almeric "amusing if occasionally unintelligble". Harry Harmon's Ivanoff was "interesting, if occasionally obscuring the plot", while Olive Wyndham, Ida Vernon, and Hassard Short were judged admirable, but "Mr. Glendinning was very noisy".

Charles Darnton in The Evening World echoed The New York Times in pointing out that William Hodge "acts from the brain, not the lungs" and advising John Glendinning to take note. He summed the play up as "a capital comedy, capitally acted", and said "The Man from Home has come to stay". The critic for the New-York Tribune made many errors in their report: ascribing authorship of the play three times to George Ade; identifying the character of Almeric as the primary motivator of the marriage plot; and saying the play ends with an Indiana wedding announcement. That of The Brooklyn Daily Eagle spoke only in broad generalities in their brief review, forgetting to name the theater where it played.

=== Closing ===
The production closed at the Astor Theatre on November 6, 1909, after 70 weeks (Note: This figure includes the eight weeks that the play was on hiatus during the summer of 1909.) and 496 performances. It then moved from Broadway to Brooklyn's Majestic Theatre starting November 15, 1909. Liebler & Company had joined the Shuberts alliance in their battle against the Theatrical Syndicate, so all theaters on The Man from Home tour would be Shubert-owned, with the exception of Boston's Park Theatre, where a separate booking arrangement had been made with Charles Frohman.

== Adaptations ==
=== Film ===
- The Man from Home (1914 film)
- The Man from Home (1922 film) - The complete film is accessible online through this Wikipedia article.

== Bibliography ==
- Booth Tarkington and Harry Leon Wilson. The Man from Home. Harper & Brothers, 1908. (Dedicated to William Hodge)
- George C. Tyler and J. C. Furnas. Whatever Goes Up. Bobbs Merrill, 1934.
