= The Man from Home =

The Man from Home may refer to:

- The Man from Home (play), a 1908 stage play by Booth Tarkington and Harry Leon Wilson
- The Man from Home (1914 film), a film directed by Cecil B. DeMille
- The Man from Home (1922 film), a film directed by George Fitzmaurice
