= Hearts of Oak (1879 play) =

1879 play by James Herne and David Belasco

Hearts of Oak is an 1879 play by Americans James Herne and David Belasco taken from the British play, The Mariner's Compass, by Henry Leslie (1830–1881).

== Hearts of Oak ==
The play is a melodrama concerning a woman who marries her guardian out of gratitude, even though she loves another man. It was extraordinarily successful on tour, starring Belasco, and earning a fortune for him. Hearts of Oaks first opened as a five act and six tableaux production at the Hamlin's Theatre in Chicago on November 17, 1879. The actress Chrystal Herne was named after the character her mother, Katherine Corcoran, portrayed in the piece.

== Cast ==
Opening Night Players	Role
James A. Herne	Terry Dennison
Harry Mainhall	Ruby Darell
William H. Crompton	Uncle Davy
David Belasco	Mr. Ellingham
Frank K. Pierce	Owen Garroway
William A. Lavalle	Foreman of the Mill
William Lawrence	Clerk of the Mill
Lillie Hamilton	Wil Barton
Katherine Corcoran (Mrs. Herne)	Chrystal
Rose Watson	Aunt Betsy
Alice Hamilton	Little Chrystal
Dolly Hamilton	Tawdrey
J.A. Andrews	Mr. Parker
J. Sherman	Tom
T. Gossman	Sleuth
Unknown Female Child	The Baby

== Reviews ==
The Daily Globe, St. Paul, Minnesota – January 23, 1882

The Hearts of Oak company began an engagements of four performances at Leubrie’s theater last night. They may be congratulated. The company has been improved and strengthened since last season and is now equal to any presenting dramas of like character on the road. Jas. A Hearne (sic) who replaces Frank Aiken as Terry Dennison is a type of the simple sailor who sacrifices his own hopes for happiness of the object of his love. His acting is spirited and perfect in keeping with the character. The strength of his love for Chrystal shown in his discovery of the affection existing between her and Ruby is faithfully and strongly portrayed. And in the scene with his child, to whom he dares not make himself known, his acting is worthy of the warmest praise. The restraint that his noble self-denying heart places as the barrier between himself and the fruition of his parental love – the blind man casting off for others all hope for the future in the care for wife and child was true to nature in delineation though unfortunately too elevated for nature in fact. Harry Mainhal was an excellent Ruby Darell and Catherine Corcoran a charming and natural Chrystal. Mr. Charles H. Clark (Uncle Davy) and F. Chippendale (Owen Garroway) deserve favorable mention. The Latter in the supper scene aroused a storm of laughter by his vicarious hospitality and awkwardness

The Michigan Argonaut, March, 1883

Herne's Hearts of Oak drew one of the largest audiences of the season at the Opera House Wednesday evening. The play is well named for surely none, but Hearts of Oak could stand the intense strain which finally did cause one heart to break. The shipwrecked orphan-girl in real life, who marries her protector out of a sense of duty, though desperately in love with one more equal in age, is an extremely rare and interesting object. The company was good from first to last. Herne, as Terry Dennison, played an unexceptional role. Miss Corcoran as Crystal, did justice to a difficult part, and was especially effective in the scene in the grave with Ruby. Uncle Davy and Aunt Betsey, ably assisted by Owen Garroway, caused many cunning side scenes which served to relieve the deep melancholy that pervades the whole play. Little Maud Thompson as Little Crystal is a "daisy," and we predict a brilliant future for her. The scenic effects, especially in the wreck scene, demand a large stage for their best representation, but were quite effective. The play does not follow the canons of Horace, having six acts. The interludes were rather too long, but the audience endured them each time with sweet anticipation of the treat to follow.

== Film adaptions ==
Two film adaptions were made:

- Hearts of Oak (1914), directed by Wray Physioc
- Hearts of Oak (1924), directed by John Ford

== Notes and references ==
- Banham, Martin, ed. 1998. The Cambridge Guide to Theatre. Cambridge: Cambridge University Press. ISBN 0-521-43437-8.
