= Maud Raymond =

American actress, singer and comedian

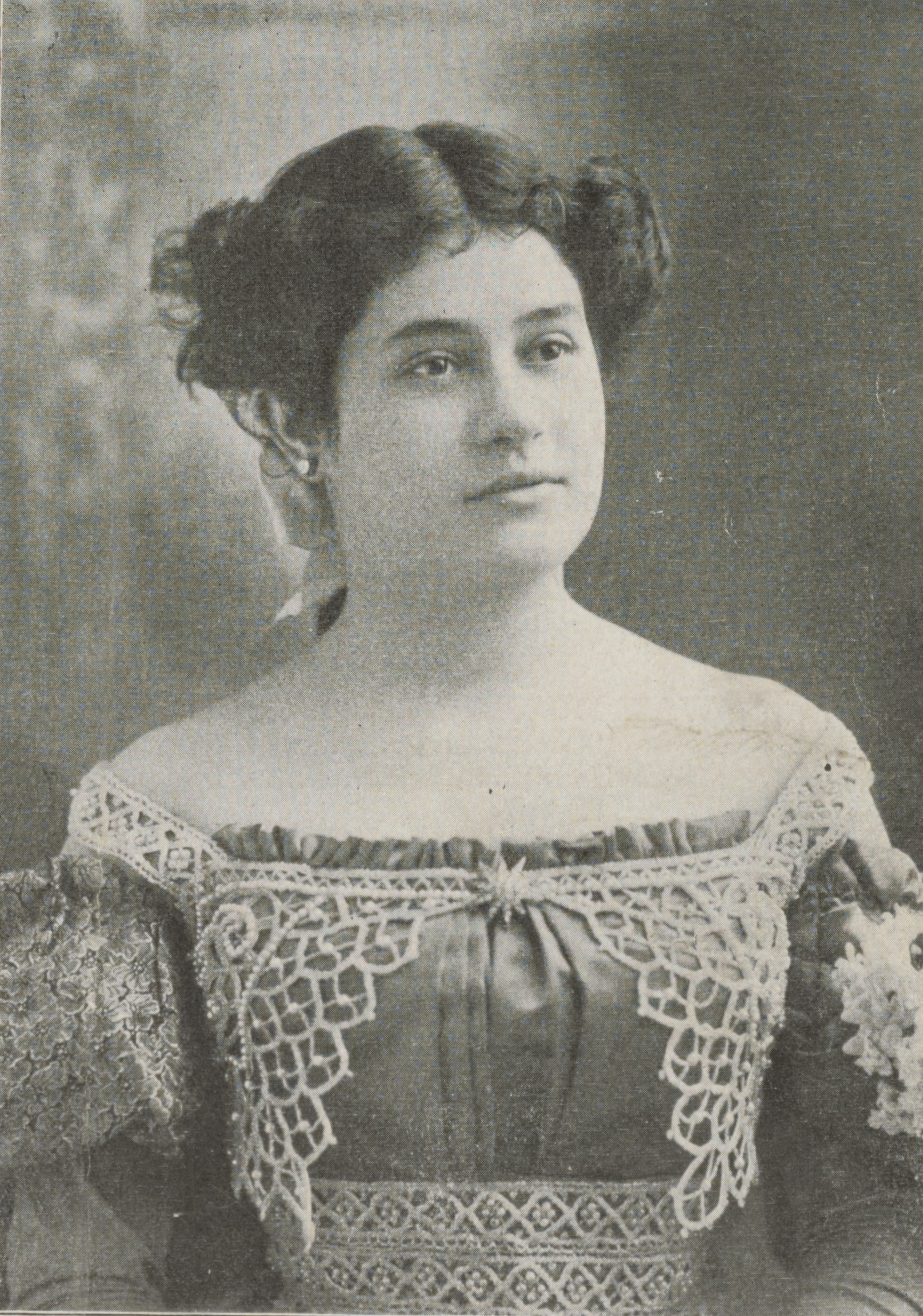
1897 photograph of Maud Raymond

Maud Raymond (sometimes spelled Maude Raymond), also known by her married name Maud Rogers or Mrs. Gus Rogers (August 15, 1871 – May 10, 1961) was an American actress, singer, and comedienne. Born Rashel Lobenstein in New York City, she performed under the stage name Maud Raymond. She began her career in variety theatre in the late 1880s; and established herself as a star in vaudeville and burlesque entertainments beginning in the 1890s as a soubrette. In her early career she was known for her comedic work in the soubrette style and for her performances of ballads and excerpts from operas.

In 1895 she married the comedian Gus Rogers of the Rogers Brothers, and was active in the Rogers Brothers shows in which she excelled in comic portrayals of Dutch and German characters. Some of these shows were performed on Broadway in addition to touring the United States. Raymond also appeared in several Broadway plays and musicals without the Rogers Brothers from 1901 through 1912. Beginning with the part of Topsy in the 1901 Broadway production of Uncle Tom's Cabin some of her parts were performed in blackface. As a vocalist in the first decade of the 20th century she became associated with coon songs and ragtime pieces during her Broadway career. She made several recordings for the Victor Talking Machine Company in 1909-1910 which are catalogued in the Discography of American Historical Recordings.

== Early life ==
The daughter of H. Lobenstein and Lena Lobenstein, Rashel Lobenstein was born on Orchard Street in New York City on August 15, 1871. (Note: Primary documents give conflicting dates on Maud Raymond's birth. The 1880 United States census states she was nine years old at the time of the census, placing her year of birth in c. 1871. The 1900 United States Federal Census states she was born in August 1873. The 1910 United States census gives her year of birth as 1875. The 1920 United States census states she was 43 years old at the time of the census; placing her birth year in c. 1877. The 1950 United States census states she was 78 years old at the time of the census placing her birth year in c. 1872. Her death certificate in the New York State, Death Index, 1957-1968 lists her year of birth as c. 1872. Several book sources also use c. 1872 as her date of birth. However, The Actor's Birthday Book gives her day of birth as August 15. The New York Times was clear she was 89 years old when she died on May 10, 1961; which would match a date of birth on August 15, 1891. This would also match the age given at the time of the 1880 census. August 15, 1891 is the date given in the Internet Broadway Database.) Her father was born in Russia and her mother was born in Bavaria. The family later Americanized the spelling of her name to Rachel "Ray" Levingston. She was educated in New York City Public Schools located in the East Side of Manhattan.

== Early career ==
Raymond began her career performing in variety theatre as a member of the burlesque troupe of Rice & Barton. In January 1889 she performed in a variety benefit concert given to raise funds for the Eastern District Hebrew Free School in Brooklyn. In November 1889 she was performing in the play Oklahoma Nick at the Grand Museum; a dime museum in New York City. By February 1890 she was performing in a variety show at another New York City dime museum, Huber's Palace Museum, which was owned and operated by George H. Huber (1843-1916). That same year she went to work as a singer in another one of Huber's business ventures, Huber & Gebhardt's Casino.

In January 1891 Raymond was performing in vaudeville at the Winter Garden Theater in St. Louis, Missouri with the St. Louis Post-Dispatch describing her as a "talented and pretty baladiste". By the following March she was back in New York performing in a variety show at Feltman's Tivoli Theatre . The Brooklyn Daily Times review described her as a "serio-comic vocalist and soubrette. Later in the year she was performing in vaudeville in Ohio before joining the burlesque theatre troupe Turner's English Girls as the company's prima donna. She performed with this group in theaters in Kansas, and Texas. By the end of November 1891 she was back in Brooklyn performing in a minor part in the premiere of Henry Grattan Donnelly's farce A Pair of Jacks at the Bedford Ave Theatre. By the end of the year she was performing as a member of Rose Hill's English Folly Company in Rhode Island; and remained with the company on tour for performances in theaters in New York, Pennsylvania, Kentucky, and Ohio in 1892.

In September 1892 Raymond performed for the re-opening of the newly renovated Shea's Music Hall in Buffalo, New York. That same month she joined the theatre troupe of Joseph J. Sullivan playing the soubrette part in The Black Thorn in Connecticut. In October 1892 she appeared in concert with the band of the United States 23rd Infantry Regiment for performances in Brooklyn. She spent the remainder of the year touring the United States in the farce Bill's Boot with a cast that included actor Joseph J. Sullivan and the Russell Brothers female impersonators. She remained with that production through February 1893, and then toured in vaudeville with the Meteor Specialty Company. In April 1893 she appeared on Broadway in a variety show given at the Imperial Music Hall that was headlined by Matthews & Bulger. Later that same month she performed with Weber and Fields in their show at the Park Theatre, Manhattan, and then proceeded to tour with them to St. Louis.

In the summer of 1893 Raymond starred in the farce My Uncle for performances at the Eighth Street Theatre in Philadelphia. She then joined the burlesque troupe of Sam T. Jack for performances at the Lyceum Theatre in Boston before rejoining the Meteor Specialty Company on its tour in the vaudeville circuit beginning at the end of September 1893. By November 1893 she was performing as a member of Harry Williams's "Own Company". This was followed by tours with the Irwin Brothers Company and the Henry Burlesque Company in 1894. In the summer of 1894 she returned to New York City to perform at the American Theatre Roof Garden with a cast that included Andrew Mack. After this she joined the theatre company of Boston's Howard Athenaeum with whom she toured to Broadway's Tony Pastor's 14th Street Theatre in the autumn of 1894. She also performed with the company at Albaugh's Grand Opera House in Washington D.C. and the Chestnut Street Opera House in Philadelphia in September 1894.

== The Rogers Brothers and Broadway ==
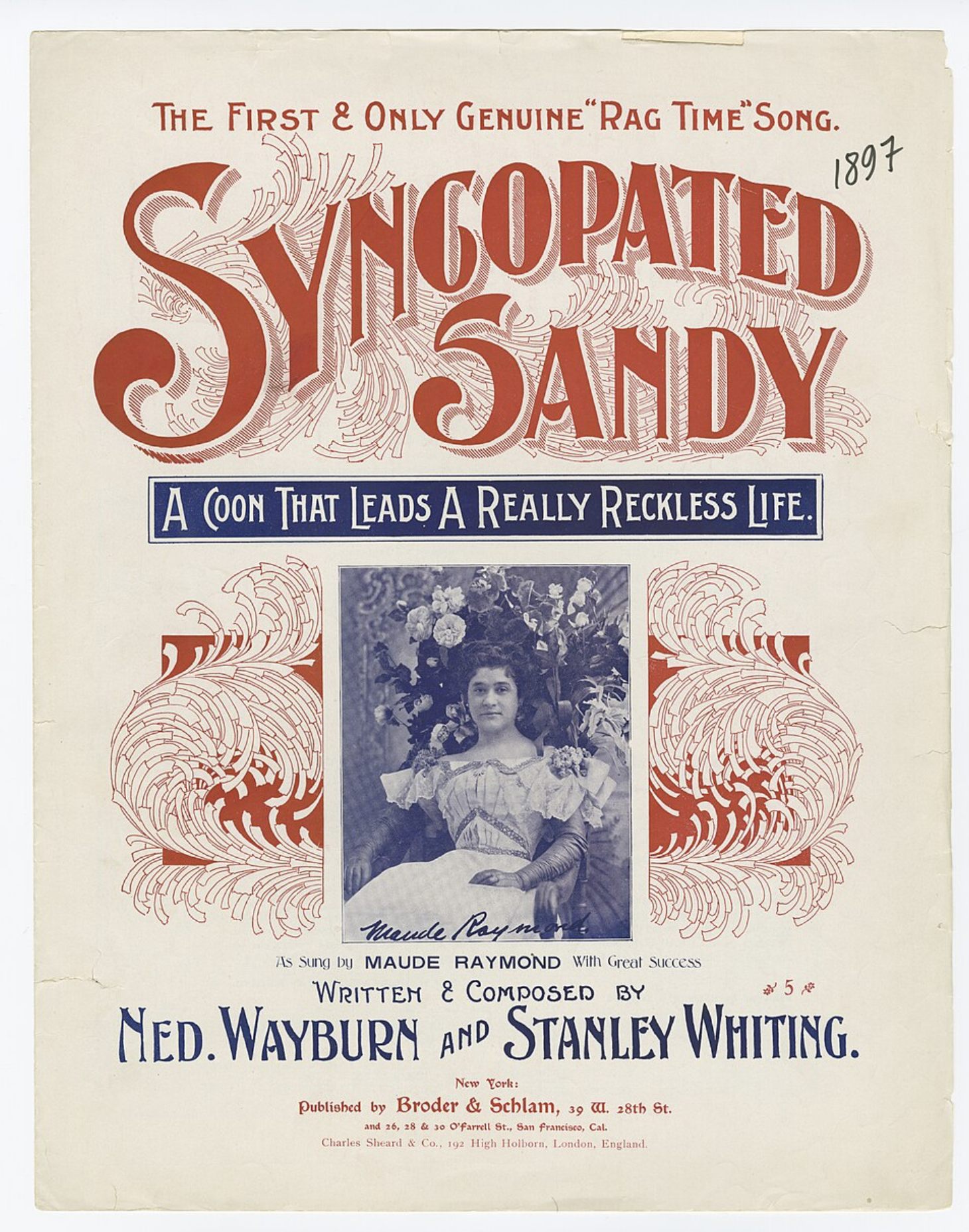
Front cover of the sheet music for "Syncopated Sandy"; a ragtime piece and coon song with Maud Raymond on the cover.

In the final months of 1894 Raymond was touring in the variety theatre troupe of Fields and Hanson. In this troupe was Maud's soon to be husband, Gus Rogers (real name Gustave Solomon), who was performing with his brother Max in their act, the Rogers Brothers. In January 1895 both Raymond and the Rogers Brothers were engaged on Broadway in the variety show playing at Tony Pastor's 14th Street Theatre. In the midst of this run Gus and Maud married in New York City on January 30, 1895. Maud's mother died not long after their marriage; forcing her to abandon planned performances in Connecticut in February 1895.

In March 1895 Raymond was engaged for variety performances at Broadway's Casino Theatre and then returned to performing with the Rogers Brothers at Tony Pastor's the following month. In May 1895 she was performing in variety at Proctor's Twenty-Third Street Theatre; after which she toured with the Rogers Brothers in the Orpheum Circuit as far away as San Francisco, Los Angeles, and Washington state. In August 1895 Raymond and the Rogers Brothers were performing at the Olympic Theatre in Chicago in a company headlined by Mathews & Bulger. Later that same month the trio returned to New York for a residence at the Madison Square Roof Garden. On Labor Day 1895, Raymond and the Rogers Brothers performed in secondary lead roles in the premiere of the farce The Rainmakers which was a starring vehicle for the comedy duo Donnelly and Girard. Raymond had great success in the soubrette role of Bolivar in this work which toured widely in the 1895-1896 season. Writers on Raymond have labeled this her first significant stage role.

After the success of The Rainmakers, Raymond had a fifteen week engagement at Tony Pastor's. She then appeared in a succession of musical comedies that were created as starring vehicles for the Rogers Brothers, beginning with A Reign Error in 1898. This work played on Broadway in 1899; marking Maud's first appearance in a Broadway theatre that was not a vaudeville-type variety show. She subsequently starred as Letta Winnie in the Broadway productions of The Rogers Brothers in Wall Street (1899). In the Rogers Brothers shows, Raymond adopted their comedic style of lampooning German and Dutch figures; displaying a sharp wit for mimicry and a natural style of humor that one American theatre writer of the period credited as the best female performer in this genre of Dutch-comedy work active on the American stage.

Gus Rogers died in 1908; bringing an end to the Rogers Brothers. Maud continued to perform on occasion with Max Rogers; including appearing with him as Mrs. Alice Keene in the 1910 Broadway musical The Young Turk. Without her husband and brother in-law, Raymond performed in the Broadway productions of Uncle Tom's Cabin (1901, as Topsy), The New Clown (1902), The Toreador (1902, as Mrs. Malton Hoppings), The Jersey Lily (1903, as Rosie Bauer), The Social Whirl (1906, as Beezy), The Gay White Way (1907, as multiple characters), Mr. Hamlet of Broadway (1908-1909, as Molly Brown), Girlies (1910), The Revue of Revues (1911), and My Best Girl (1912, as Daphne Follette).

As a vocalist, Raymond's early career as a soubrette was focused on singing ballads and excerpts from operas. She later became associated with coon songs and ragtime pieces during her Broadway career. In the former literature she would perform these songs in blackface. Some of the blackface repertoire she performed on Broadway included her roles in Uncle Tom's Cabin (her first blackface role) and The Social Whirl. One of the popular ragtime pieces she introduced was Ben Jerome and Edward Madden's song "The Dusky Salome" (1908) which she performed in Mr. Hamlet of Broadway. In My Best Girl (1912) she introduced Irving Berlin's song "My Soft Shoes". She was a recording artist with the Victor Talking Machine Company, and her recordings dating to 1909-1910 are catalogued in the Discography of American Historical Recordings.

== Later life and death ==
Maud Raymond died at the age of 89 on May 10, 1961 in Rockville Centre, New York.

== Notes and references ==
=== Bibliography ===
- Benjamin, Ruth; Rosenblatt, Arthur (2006). "Maud Raymond ( c 1872 - May 10, 1961 )". Who sang what on Broadway, 1866-1996: Volume II, The Singers M-Z. McFarland & Company. ISBN 9780786415069.
- Bordman, Gerald; Norton, Richard (2010). American Musical Theatre: A Chronicle, Fourth Edition. Oxford University Press. ISBN 978-0199729708.
- Briscoe, Johnson (1907). "August 15, Maude Raymond". The Actor's Birthday Book. Moffat, Yard and Company.
- Dietz, Dan (2022). The Complete Book of 1900s Broadway Musicals. Rowman & Littlefield Publishers. ISBN 9781538168943.
- Dietz, Dan (2021). The Complete Book of 1910s Broadway Musicals. Rowman & Littlefield Publishers. ISBN 9781538150283.
- Frick, John W. (2016). Uncle Tom's Cabin on the American Stage and Screen. Palgrave Macmillan. ISBN 9781137566454.
- Gänzl, Kurt (2001). "The Rogers Brothers". The Encyclopedia of the Musical Theatre, Second Edition. Vol. III. Schirmer Books. ISBN 9780028655741.
- Koch, E. De Roy; Browne, Walter, eds. (1908). "Raymond, Miss Maud (Mrs. Gus Solomon)". Who's Who on the Stage, 1908: The Dramatic Reference Book and Biographical Dictionary of the Theatre: Containing Careers of Actors, Actresses, Managers and Playwrights of the American Stage. B.W. Dodge. p. 357.
- Sharp, Harold S. (1975). "Rogers, Mrs. Gus (1872? – 1961)". Handbook of Pseudonyms and Personal Nicknames: First Supplement. Vol. II, K–Z. Scarecrow Press.
- Strang, Lewis Clinton (1906). "Maud Raymond". Famous Prima Donnas. L. C. Page & Co. pp. 233–238.
- White, Matthew Jr. (1907). "The Beginning of Stage Careers". The Scrap Book, Volume II:September 1906 to February 1907. The Frank A Munsey Company.
