= Sag Harbor (play) =

1899 play by James Herne

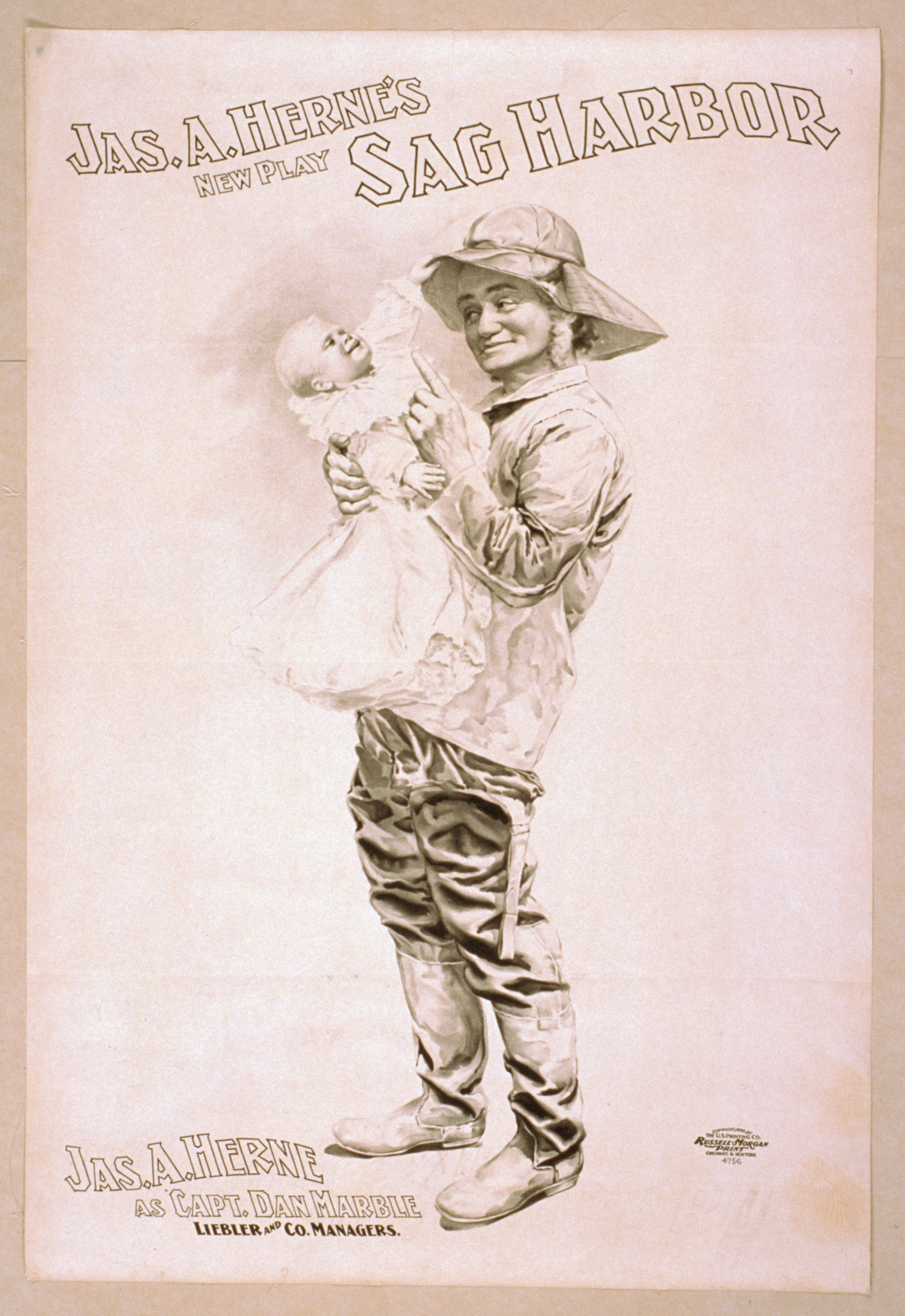
- Original language: English
- Written by: James A. Herne
- Subject: Life in a seaside village
- Genre: Comedy
- Setting: Sag Harbor, New York

Premiere
- Date: September 27, 1900
- Place: Theatre Republic
- Directed by: James A. Herne

Sag Harbor, sub-titled An Old Story, is an 1899 comedy, the last play written by American author James Herne. It has four acts and three settings, all within Sag Harbor, New York, while the action covers a two-year time span. The play is a rural comedy, with two brothers competing for the same girl, and an older widower wooing a shy spinster. The play avoids melodrama, emphasising the realistic nature of its characters, though as one critic pointed out they occasionally do unreal things.

The play was produced by Liebler & Company, with staging by the author, and sets by Gates and Morange and Ernest Albert. Herne and two of his daughters, Julie Herne and Chrystal Herne, were among a cast that included Lionel Barrymore, Forrest Robinson, and William Hodge.

Its performance started with an extensive tour beginning October 1899 that was cut short in April 1900 when James Herne fell ill. When it did arrive on Broadway in late September 1900, critical appreciation was mixed; while the characterisations were praised the dramatic action was not, and some reviewers thought Herne had handled the same themes better in Shore Acres (1892). The New York public was also indifferent; the Broadway run closed December 1, 1900.

== Characters ==
Only characters with spoken lines are listed.

Lead

- Ben Turner is 40, son of William Turner, a boatwright making lifeboats for the navy.
- Frank Turner is 23, William's younger son, a sailor in the navy who returns after five years away.
- Martha Reese is 20, a pretty young lady, who when orphaned as a girl was raised by Ben.

Supporting

- Capt. Dan Marble is 60, master of the sloop Kacy and longtime suitor for Elizabeth Ann.
- Elizabeth Anne is 45, William's spinster sister, shy of marriage because of all the "begats" in Genesis.
- Jane Cauldwell is 20, a pretty young music teacher who now lives in Bridgehampton, New York.
- Freeman Whitmarsh is a painter and glazier, who heads the church choir, but spreads more gossip than gospel.

Featured

- George Salter is mid-thirties, Ben's right-hand man at the boatyard.
- Mrs. John Russell is 75, a widow, cheerful and content with life and her knitting.
- William Turner called "Uncle Billy", is 70, father to Ben and Frank, and agent for the steamer Antelope.
- Frances Towd is a short middle-aged widow with two boys from nearby Water Mill, New York.
- Hosea Stevens is bar-keeper at the Nassau Tavern in Sag Harbor.
- Miss Baily is a manicurist from Gloversville, New York, who rides bicycles and give lectures.

== Synopsis ==
All settings are in Sag Harbor, New York.

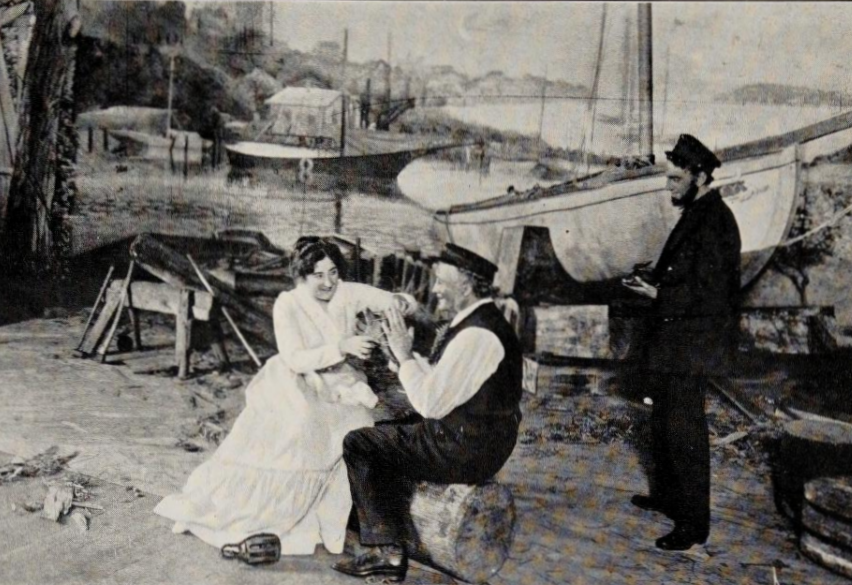

Act I (A small boatyard; May 1895.) Elizabeth Anne and Dan Marble are sitting on a spar, playing cat's cradle while he woos her. George Salter comes by to work on a boat and tease them. Elizabeth leaves, and Freeman Whitmarsh and his new helper Frances Towd stroll by on their way to a job. Ben Turner tells Dan that Frank Turner will be home that night. Dan tells Ben he ought to get married. He has heard from Freeman that church gossip says Martha Reese loves Ben, while Freeman himself says Martha has a locket with Ben's picture in it. When Martha appears, happy because Frank is coming home, Ben startles her with a proposal. Bewildered, she asks time to think it over and hurries off, dropping her locket on the way. Dan finds it and looks inside: it is Frank's photo, not Ben's. Aghast, he apologises to Ben and swears he'll throttle Freeman. At act's end, Frank enters in his naval uniform, happy and cheerful, and looking for Martha.

Act II (Interior of work shop at boatyard; the next afternoon) While George and others are working on the Kacy, Freeman and Dan are painting the sloop's summerhouse. (Note: The "summerhouse" was a removable wooden superstructure fitted over a portion of the deck on the sloop to provide shelter from weather.) Ben and his men leave to launch a repaired boat. Jane Cauldwell enters and teases Freeman, then goes out to find Martha. Freeman and Dan depart to watch the launching. Martha and Frank enter the deserted workshop, where she tries to explain her choice. Ben comes in, shows Martha her lost locket and says he knows her decision. But Martha contradicts Ben; she will marry him. The others return to the workshop. Ben tells them Martha has accepted his proposal and sends George for champagne from the Nassua House. Hosea Stevens brings it, and everyone but Martha and Frank sip some. The Antelope docks early and all rush out to meet it, save Frank and Martha. Martha tries to console him, but Ben calls to her from outside and she leaves. As she does Jane enters, and Martha tells her the sorry news. Jane hugs Frank, but he is inconsolable. He exits, Jane bursts into tears, then leaves. Elizabeth and Dan re-enter. Dan shows her plans for a Queen Anne cottage on a lot he just bought. Elizabeth finally agrees to marry him.

Act III (Living room of William Turner's house; a Saturday night in April 1897) Martha and Ben are married and now have a baby girl. Dan and Elizabeth Anne have also married and live in their new cottage. Mrs. Russell, Martha, and Elizabeth are making baby clothes, while Elizabeth confides to Martha that Dan still doesn't know she's pregnant. Frank has returned from another few months at sea on a commercial ship. Martha now wonders whether she made the right decision. Freeman and Jane come in to have supper. Everyone conspires to separate Freeman from Jane and put her next to Frank. Finally Freeman gets upset and leaves, taking Jane with him. While the others are outside, Frank and Martha start quarrelling. Ben hears them and says he'll give Martha a divorce, but she doesn't want that. Frank and Ben nearly come to blows. Dan takes them back to his place, while Elizabeth stays overnight with Martha.

Act IV (Same location; Easter Sunday, the next day) Elizabeth is holding Martha's baby when Dan enters, still not knowing his wife is expecting. Martha has not gone to sleep all night; neither have Ben and Frank. They all enter and for some minutes sit, until Ben says he's going to the Klondike, leaving Martha and the boatyard to Frank. Martha tries to convince Ben of her love, but Frank says to let him go. Martha retorts "either you both go or both stay". Dan tells them a yarn about three people in the same situation that calms them all down. Ben and Martha are at last reconciled, and Frank accepts the status quo. Jane drops by the Turner house and Frank is at last ready to accept her attentions. Freeman brings by his latest gal, a gum-chewing pants-wearing "intellectual" named Miss Baily. And Elizabeth finally tells Dan her news... (Curtain)

== Original production ==
=== Background ===
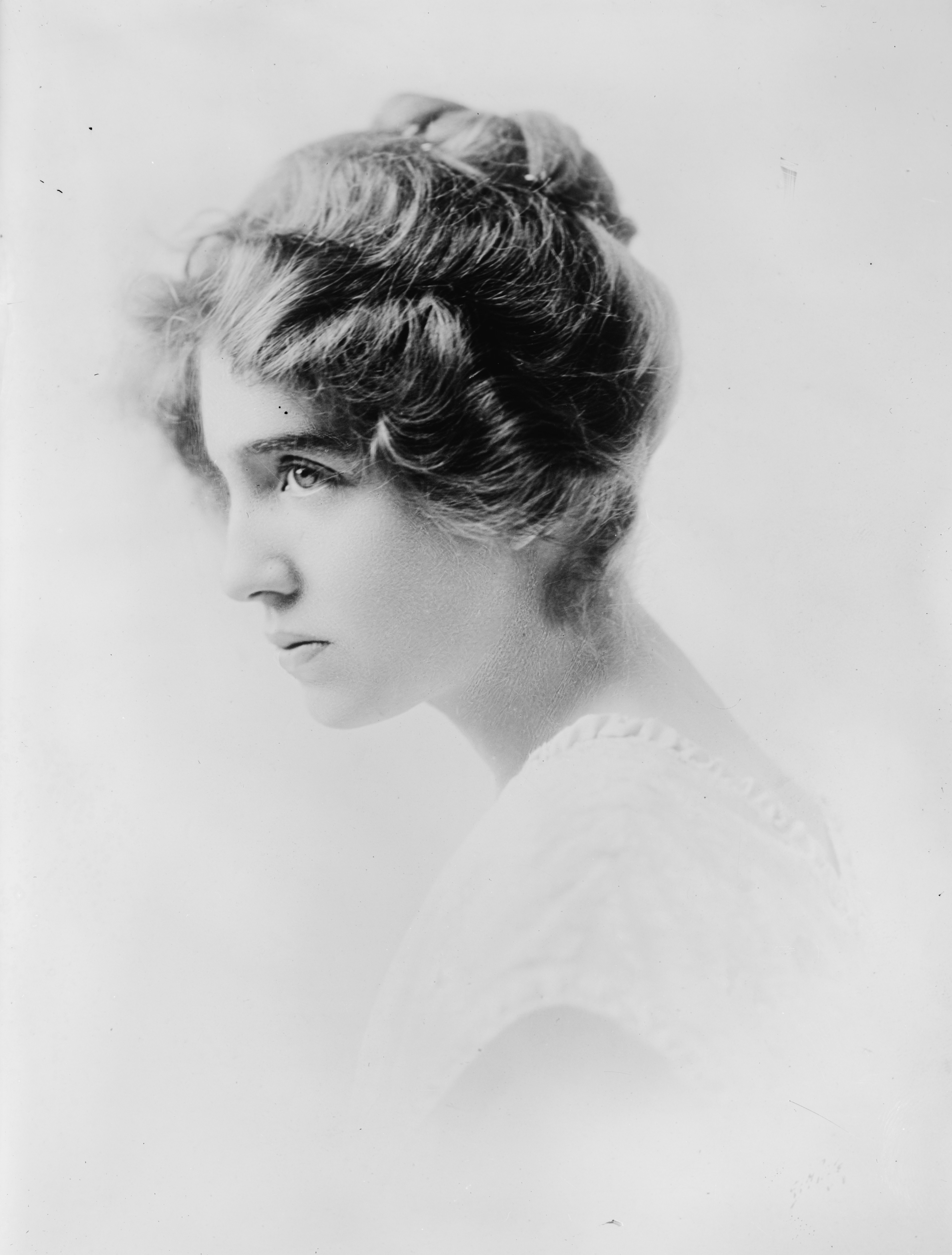
Julie Herne

James Herne spent the summer of 1899 in Sag Harbor, getting to know the locals and writing the play. That spring he had come to the end of his contract with Henry C. Miner, and dissatisfied with Miner's refusal to produce Griffith Davenport, declined to renew it. He instead signed with a firm new to theatrical management, Liebler & Company. The play's original title of Sag Harbor Folks, was changed to just Sag Harbor by September.

Liebler & Company was a partnership between investor Theodore A. Liebler and producer-manager George C. Tyler. James A. Herne staged Children of the Ghetto for them during August 1899, for which he demanded and received $500 a week.

William Hodge was discovered by James Herne as a bit player in a Rogers Brothers' musical comedy, "a thirty-five dollar a week man". Herne wanted him for Sag Harbor. As he was under contract to Klaw and Erlanger, George C. Tyler persuaded Abe Erlanger to loan him to Liebler & Company.

By early September 1899 Gates and Morange had submitted models to Liebler & Company for approval before starting construction on the full-size sets. This was their third project for Liebler & Company. They had been commissioned to build the sets for Children of the Ghetto, soon to open in Washington, D.C., and to refurbish the original sets for The Christian, now on tour. Rehearsals were held at the Herald Square Theatre in New York.

=== Cast ===
Principal cast for the opening tour and during the original Broadway run. The show was on hiatus from April 8 through September 27, 1900.
Role	Actor	Dates	Notes and sources
Frank Turner	Sydney Booth	Oct 24, 1899 - Apr 07, 1900	Son of Junius Brutus Booth Jr. and Agnes Booth, he was said to resemble his uncle Edwin Booth.
Frank Turner	Lionel Barrymore	Sep 27, 1900 - Dec 01, 1900	
Ben Turner	Forrest Robinson	Oct 24, 1899 - Dec 01, 1900	
Martha Reese	Julie Herne	Oct 24, 1899 - Dec 01, 1900	
Capt. Dan Marble	James Herne	Oct 24, 1899 - Mar 29, 1900	
Capt. Dan Marble	Frank Monroe	Mar 30, 1900 - Apr 07, 1900	Monroe took over when Herne dropped out for medical reasons.
Capt. Dan Marble	James Herne	Sep 27, 1900 - Dec 01, 1900	Herne resumed this role for the Broadway run.
Freeman Whitmarsh	William Hodge	Oct 24, 1899 - Dec 01, 1900	
Elizabeth Ann Turner	Marion Abbott	Oct 24, 1899 - Dec 01, 1900	
Jane Cauldwell	Chrystal Herne	Oct 24, 1899 - Dec 01, 1900	Herne was just seventeen when she began playing this role.
George Salter	Charles Dibdin Pitt	Oct 24, 1899 - Dec 01, 1900	
Mrs. John Russell	Mrs. Sol Smith	Oct 24, 1899 - Dec 01, 1900	
William Turner	Frank Monroe	Oct 24, 1899 - Dec 01, 1900	
Hosea Stevens	John D. Garrick	Oct 24, 1899 - Dec 01, 1900	
Frances Towd	Jessie Dodd	Oct 24, 1899 - Apr 07, 1900	
Frances Towd	Mollie Revel	Sep 27, 1900 - Dec 01, 1900	
Miss Baily	Harriett McDonald	Oct 24, 1899 - Dec 01, 1900	

=== Opening tour ===
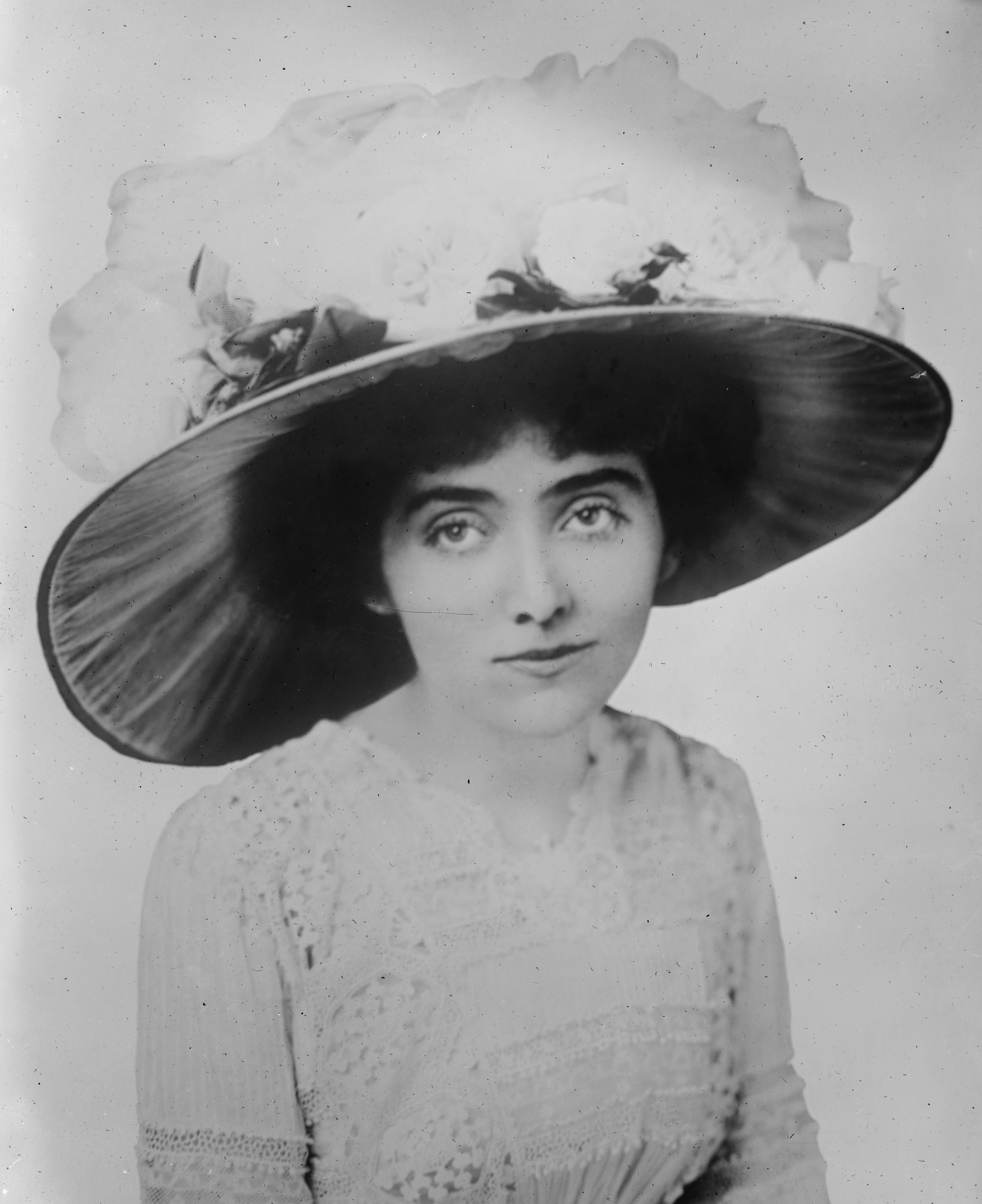
Chrystal Herne

The first performance of Sag Harbor occurred on October 24, 1899 (Note: It had been delayed one day by the late arrival of stage properties from the Herald Square Theatre in New York where the production had been rehearsed.) at the Park Theatre in Boston. It ran there for over 100 performances, moving on to the Lynn Theatre in Lynn, Massachusetts starting January 22, 1900, then to the Jefferson Theatre in Portland, Maine on February 3, 1900. After further stops in New England, the production moved to Chicago for a four-week engagement at the Grand Opera House starting March 19, 1900. James Herne fell ill in late March and was replaced for a few performances by Frank Monroe, until the tour was cut short on April 7, 1900.

The reviewer for the Boston Evening Transcript saluted the seriousness with which James Herne approached playwriting, and his determination to present real people in their natural locales, but claimed Herne's long years as an actor caused him to still view action from a stage vantage. As a result, Sag Harbor had strong characterization but a weak plot. The reviewer noted the play's strengths and audience enthusiasm and predicted success for the work despite the unnaturalness of the main storyline. The critic for Boston Globe also noted the weak plotting that leads to abrupt emotional shifts of affection amongst the lead characters, but dismissed it as immaterial to the play's success.

The review appearing in the Chicago Tribune five months into the tour suggests Herne had made no changes to the play, for it pointed up exactly the same failing as had the Boston critics. In response to James Herne's between acts expository on his characters, the reviewer said: "Mr. Herne strained the truth, not when he said they were real, but when he said what they did was real. For real characters they do many things which would be unreal in any part of the world-- and they do it persistently."

=== Premiere and reception ===
After a six-month hiatus, the play premiered on Broadway on September 27, 1900, for the grand opening of Oscar Hammerstein I's Theatre Republic. The New York Times reviewer spent much of their column on the new theater's decor, and opening night events such as speeches by James Herne and Oscar Hammerstein. Their assessment of the play itself was mixed: a trite story and ancient gags, but also "spontaneous and diverting humor". They mentioned only three actors, giving James Herne his due, but slighting his daughter Julie Herne as "sadly overweighted in a role requiring intelligble emotional expression", while William Hodge was saluted for a triumph, "the best in the piece".

The reviewer for The Brooklyn Times echoed earlier critics: "The story of the girl who, loved by two brothers, marries the one whom she doesn't love, for no very clear reason, is not strong enough to bear the weight of the fabric piled upon it, and about two-thirds of the play ignores the main theme entirely". The same reviewer found the acting "admirable", bestowing special praise on Julie Herne and William Hodge. The Brooklyn Citizen drama critic said of Sag Harbor that "Mr. Herne has not developed this slight plot in a very convincing manner" and that it lacked the "dramatic strength" of Shore Acres, but he had succeeded "in evolving an original and interesting atmosphere study". They also credited the acting of James Herne and William Hodge, and thought the Broadway debuts of the Misses Herne showed promise.

William Raymond Sill in The Evening World had caustic views on the play and the new theater: "Both have done wonderfully well in most respects, but Oscar Hammerstein has built some atrocious entrances to his new playhouse, while James A. Herne has builded some very faulty dramatic situations". Sill compared Sag Harbor unfavorably with Shore Acres, then accused James Herne of inventing an unnecessary fourth-act scene for his daughter Chrystal, so as to placate her in lieu of Julie Herne's much larger part. (Note: Sill also described Chrystal as the older daughter, when she was three years younger than Julie.) He complimented Herne's direction of the cast, save for "the two little Herne girls" who he felt should be replaced by more experienced actors.

=== Closing ===
The Broadway run of Sag Harbor closed at Theatre Republic on December 1, 1900. The production then returned to touring in 1901, with Herne again dropping out due to illness in Chicago during April of that year. The tour continued with George Woodward as his replacement, (Note: Herne's daughters also left the road company as their father's health declined in late May 1901.) finishing up at the Grand Opera House in Helena, Montana on June 14, 1901.

== Bibliography ==
- James A. Herne. Shore Acres and Other Plays. Samuel French, 1928.
- George C. Tyler and J. C. Furnas. Whatever Goes Up. Bobbs Merrill, 1934.
