= Chrystal Herne =

American actress

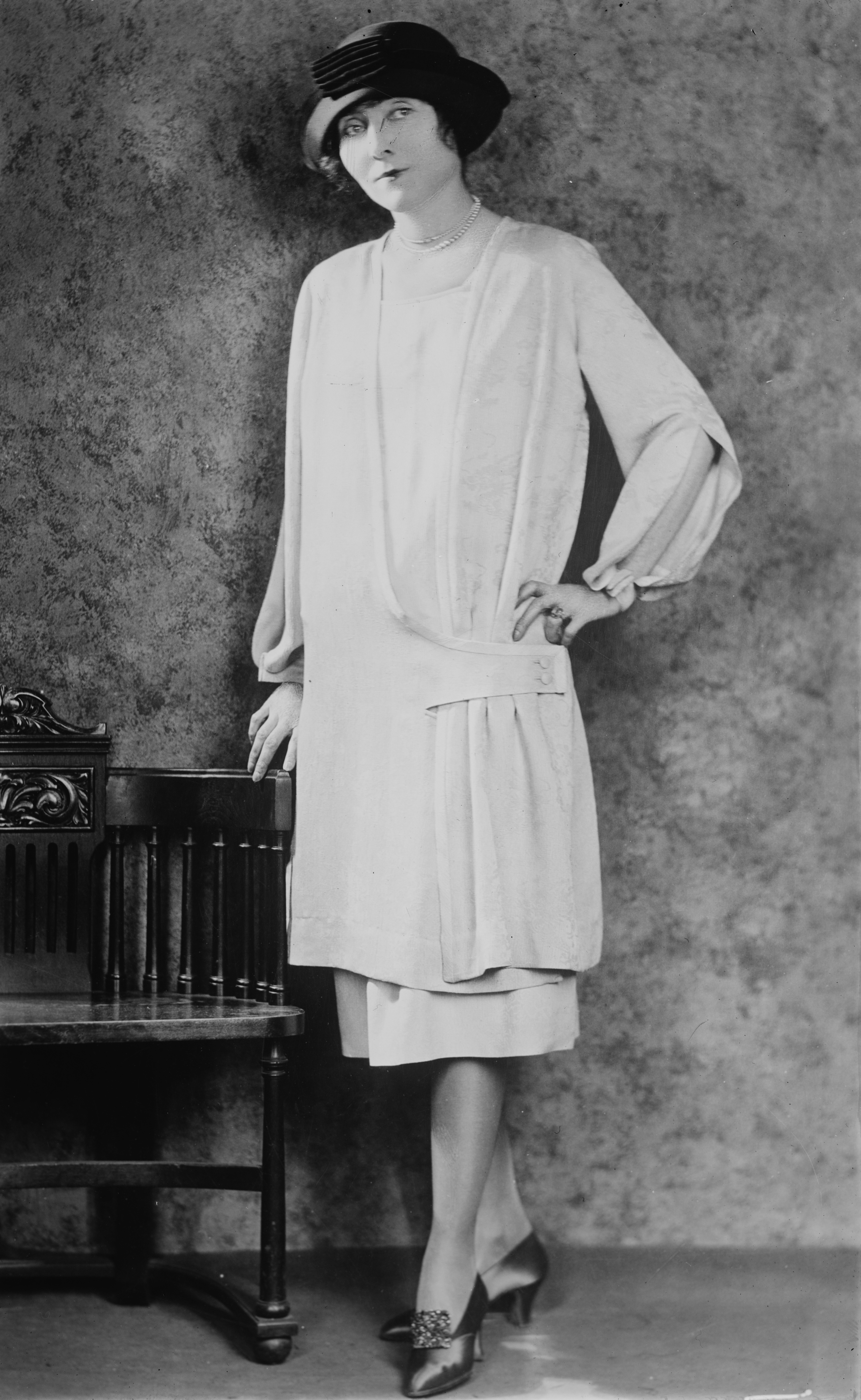
- Herne c. 1927
- Born: Katherine Chrystal Herne; June 16, 1883; Dorchester, Massachusetts, U.S.
- Died: September 19, 1950 (aged 67); Boston, Massachusetts, U.S.
- Occupation: Actor
- Years active: 1899–1936
- Spouse: Harold S. Pollard (m. 1914)
- Parents: James A. Herne (father); Katherine Corcoran (mother)

Katherine Chrystal Herne (June 16, 1883 – September 19, 1950) was an American stage actress. She was the daughter of actor/playwright James A. Herne and the younger sister of actress and Hollywood talent scout Julie Herne. Her stage credits include creating the title role in the original Broadway production of George Kelly's Pulitzer Prize–winning play, Craig's Wife (1925).

== Biography ==
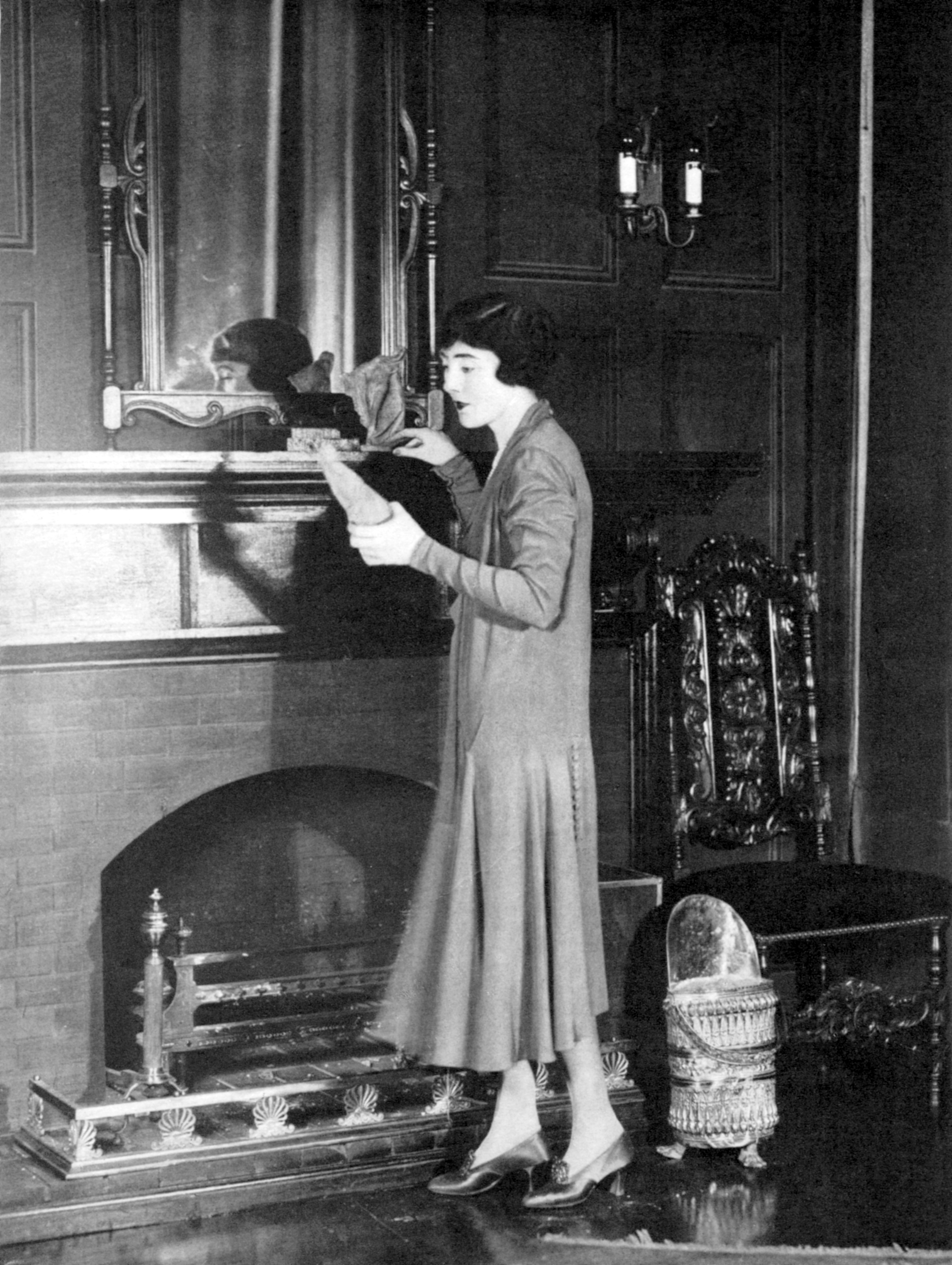
Chrystal Herne in the original Broadway production of Craig's Wife (1925)

Katherine Chrystal Herne, the middle daughter of James A. Herne and Katherine Corcoran, was born in Dorchester, Massachusetts, on June 16, 1883. She made her stage debut in Washington D.C., at the age of 16 as Sue Hardy in her father's play, The Reverend Griffith Davenport. Over the following two seasons she played Jane Cauldwell in Sag Harbor, her father's last play. Sag Harbor was a family affair, with Herne and his daughters Julie and Chrystal playing principal roles. James Herne died a short while later in early June 1901.

After her father's death, Chrystal played a third season in Sag Harbor, although this time assuming her sister's role as the heroine Martha Reese. Later that same season she played Helen Berry in one of her father's best-known plays, Shore Acres. She joined E. H. Sothern in 1903 playing Huguette in If I Were King and as Gertrude in Hamlet. She scored a major success in early 1905 in special matinees performances of Richter's Wife, in which she played the jealous wife of a famous conductor upset over his interest in a young protégé played by her sister, Julie Herne, who also wrote the piece.

Chrystal was remembered for playing the title role in Arnold Daly's production of Shaw's "Candida" during the 1905–06 season. and as Vera Revendal opposite Walker Whiteside in Israel Zangwill's The Melting Pot that debuted in 1908 at the Columbia Theatre in Washington, D.C. She was well received playing Diana opposite Dustin Farnum in a 1911 revival of The Squaw Man at the Broadway Theatre and later in her career playing the title role in Craig's Wife opposite Charles Trowbridge produced at the Morosco Theatre in 1925. She appeared in almost 40 Broadway productions over her career. Her last performance was as Beatrice Crandall in A Room in Red and White, staged at the 46th Street Theatre in January and February 1936.

== Death ==
Chrystal Herne died 14 years later, on September 19, 1950, after a month's illness at the Phillips House, a private care facility at Massachusetts General Hospital in Boston. She was cremated. She was survived by her husband, Harold S. Pollard (1878-1953), a former chief editorial writer for the New York World.

== Family ==
Besides by her husband, she left behind her sister, Julie, and a younger brother, John Temple Herne (1894–1966). John Herne appeared on stage in his youth, served as an ensign with the U.S. Navy during World War I, and later worked for Charles Scribner's Sons. He is interred at the Long Island National Cemetery in Farmingdale, N.Y. Her younger sister, Dorothy Lucille Herne preceded her in death in 1921. Dorothy, who had appeared on stage for a time, married Montrose Jonas Moses, a dramatic critic, playwright, and children's book author. Chrystal Herne also had an older sister, Alma, who died young. Her mother, Katherine Corcoran Herne, was originally an actress whom her father met while performing in San Francisco. Chrystal's name came from her mother's role in Hearts of Oak, written in 1879 by James Herne and David Belasco. Katherine Corcoran Herne died at age 86 in 1943.
