= Henry Leslie (playwright) =

British actor and playwright

Henry Leslie (6 January 1830 – 4 March 1881) was a British actor and playwright active in the mid nineteenth century.

== Biography ==
Leslie was born in Walsoken, a village in the County of Norfolk, less than two miles distance from Wisbech, Cambridgeshire, at times also listed as his place of birth. The absence of his name in some early English public records might indicate that Henry Leslie was his stage name.

Leslie made his stage debut at Ipswich in August 1847. From September 1852 to January of the following year Leslie managed the Theatre Royal, Edinburgh with Thomas Rollins, the theatre's former treasurer. After Rollins retired in January, Leslie was unable to keep the financially strapped theatre afloat and was forced to close within a month or two.

In September 1853 Leslie made his London debut at Drury Lane playing Roderigo in Shakespeare's Othello and went on to be a player at London's Olympic Theatre for five seasons. Around this time he founded The Stage College of Dramatic Tuition at 36 Queen's Crescent, Haverstock Hill in London and later managed or co-managed the Amphitheatre and Theatre Royal and the New Prince of Wales' Theatre, both in Liverpool, and the Theatre Royal in Leeds. In 1870 he toured with his own company performing The Princess of Trebizonde: an Opera Bouffe in Three Acts by Jacques Offenbach that was adapted for the English stage by Charles Lamb Kenney.

Leslie wrote the novel The Mariner's Compass in 1865 and the story "How the Ghost Walked", which appeared in Andrew Halliday's Savage Club Papers in 1868. He wrote several plays, including Adrienne or the Secret of a Life (1860); The Trail of Sin (1863); The Orange Girl, (1864); The Mariner's Compass (1865); The Sin and the Sorrow (1866); Tide and Time (1867); Friendship, Love and Truth (1868); and The Village Blacksmith (1868). The very successful American play Hearts of Oak (1879) by James Herne and David Belasco was an adaptation of Leslie's Mariner's Compass.

In the early 1850s Leslie married Louisa Doxat, the only daughter of Louis Doxat, Editor of the Observer Newspaper, London. ay 1861 the couple had three daughters and two sons, the oldest a seven-year-old daughter and the youngest a baby girl. Ten years later Leslie is listed in the census record as married and living in Liverpool, though his wife and two sons are absent from the record.

Leslie died in Paignton, Devon, a coastal town in the southwest of England, at the age of 51.
