= Margaret Fleming (play) =

1890 play by James A. Herne

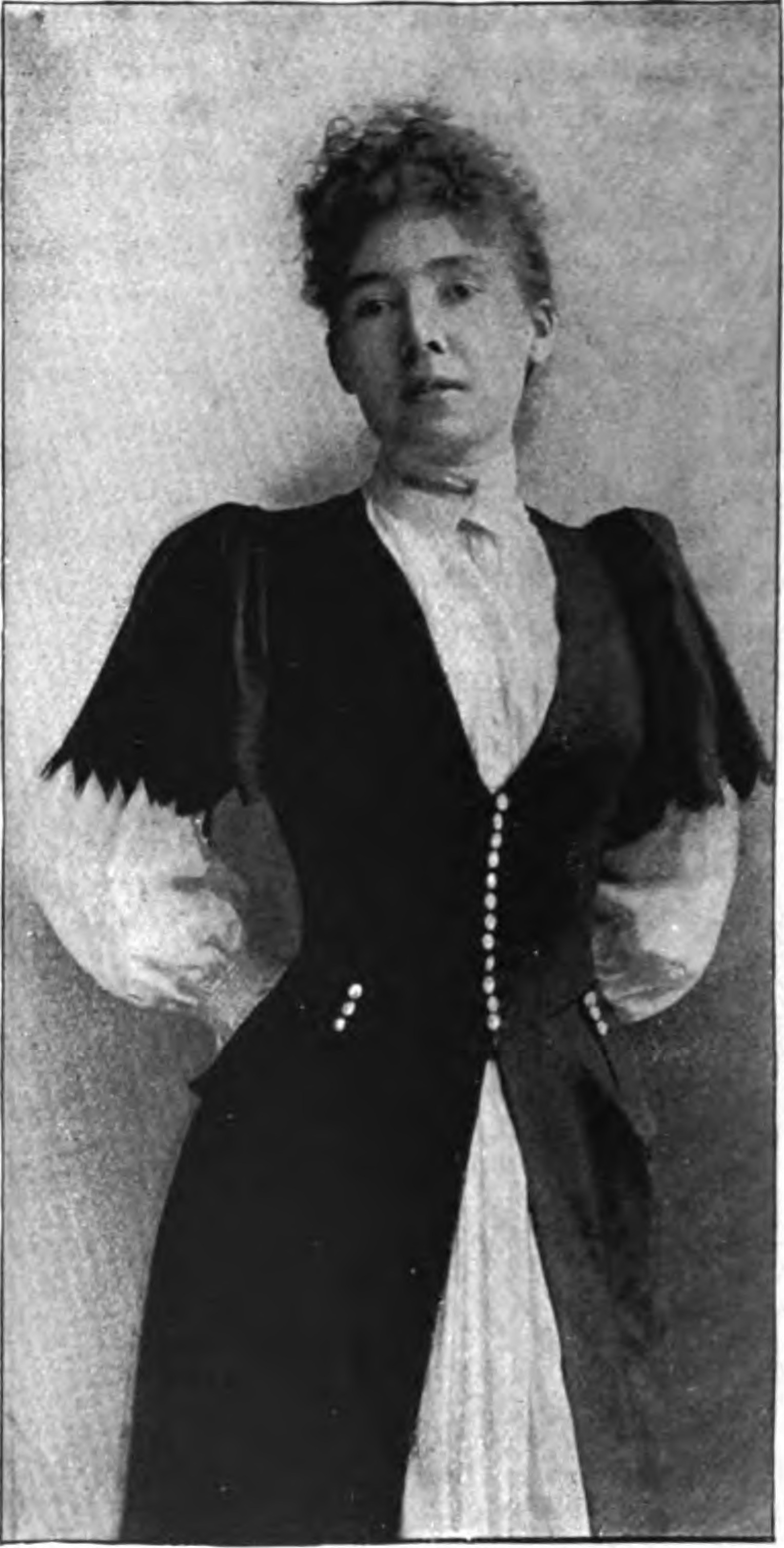
Katherine Corcoran as Margaret Fleming (1891)

Margaret Fleming is an 1890 play by James A. Herne. The play is remarkable because many critics consider it to be the first "modern" drama, a play that focused more on the psychological complexities of its characters and on the role of social determinism the characters' lives than on dramatic or melodramatic retellings.

It first ran in Lynn, Massachusetts, in July 1890, but was rejected as too controversial by theater managers in New York and Boston. Two friends and financiers of Herne's rented a theater in Boston for its opening, and the play had two three-week runs, one in May and one in October 1891. Herne's wife, Katherine Corcoran, played the title role; Herne played Philip Fleming during the trial runs but later switched to the role of street peddler Joe Fletcher. Although some critics liked the attempt towards realism, many others felt the play dwelt too much on unseemly characters and events, and audiences were shocked when Margaret nurses the baby (not her own) onstage.

== Story ==
In Act I, the audience meets Philip Fleming, manager of an inherited mill that's facing some financial troubles. He speaks with Joe Fletcher, a street peddler, and talks about his new wife, Margaret, and their new baby, Lucy. Fletcher leaves and Doctor Larkin enters and informs Fleming that he has just delivered a baby to a young immigrant woman named Lena Schmidt, and he has discovered that Fleming is the father. He advises Fleming to go to Lena. Meanwhile, Margaret is at home with baby Lucy, talking to the nursemaid, Maria Bindley. Maria reveals that her sister, Lena, has been despondent since the birth of her child, though Maria does not know who the father is.

In Act II, Doctor Larkin lectures Margaret and Philip separately about how additional stress will worsen Margaret's glaucoma. Margaret talks to Maria and agrees to go and visit her sister, hoping it will cheer her.

In Act III, Margaret visits the Bindley/Schmidt household, only to find that Lena has just died after writing a letter. Margaret compels Maria to read her the letter, which reveals that Philip was the father of Lena's baby. After sending everyone away, including sending a child to bring her husband to the house, she is left alone with the howling child and begins to nurse.

Act IV opens with a now-blind Margaret at home. Philip has been missing for seven days, but returns home to find that Margaret has taken in his illegitimate son. She tells him "the wife-heart has gone out of me," but also says she will stand by him as he tries to rebuild himself in business and reputation around the town.

== Sources ==
- Matlaw, Myron (Ed.). Nineteenth Century American Plays. New York: Applause Theatre Book Publishers, 1967.
- Meserve, Walter J. An Outline History of American Drama. New York: Feedback-Prospero, 1994. pp. 147–151.
