= Olive Wyndham =

American actress (1886–1971)

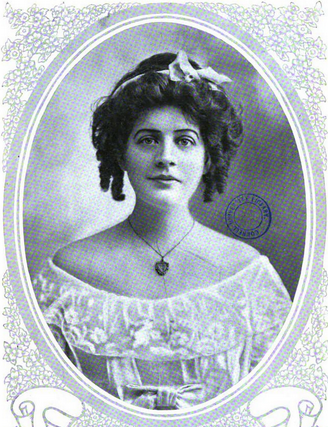
- Olive Wyndham, from a 1912 publication. Portrait by Sarony.
- Born: Olive Frances Wyndham Meysenburg; June 16, 1886; Philadelphia, Pennsylvania, U.S.
- Died: November 24, 1971 (aged 85); Santa Monica, California, U.S.
- Occupation: Actress
- Years active: 1904–1927
- Spouse(s): Andrew White Newberry (m. 1925–?), Lucien Hamilton Tyng (m. 1933–?), Harry Gaze (m. ?–1959)

Olive Frances Wyndham Meysenberg (June 16, 1886 – November 24, 1971) was an American actress on stage and in silent films.

== Early life ==
Meysenburg was born in Philadelphia, Pennsylvania, the daughter of E. A. von Meysenburg, a German diplomat, and Oral Josephine Wyndham. Her older sister Janet Beecher was also an actress. The sisters were related to Harriet Beecher Stowe on their mother's side.

Her father's work as a vice-consul for Germany led to her growing up in Chicago.

== Career ==
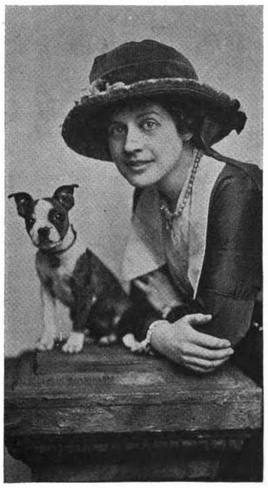
Wyndham and a toy terrier named Mary, from a 1913 publication

Wyndham's stage credits included roles in The Ruling Power (1904), She Stoops to Conquer (1905), Sir Anthony (1906), The Aero Club (1907), The Man From Home (1908), Blue Grass (1908), The Cottage in the Air (1909), The School for Scandal (1909), Sister Beatrice (1910), The Thunderbolt (1910), Nobody's Daughter (1911), The Only Son (1911), Chains (1912), Oliver Twist (1912), What Happened to Mary (1913), Countess Julia (1913), The Last Resort (1914), Children of Earth (1915), The Greatest Nation (1916), The Sweetmeat Game (1916), The Knife (1917), Nothing But Lies (1918), A Voice in the Dark (1919), The Green Goddess (1921), The Charlatan (1922), Thin Ice (1922), The Steam Roller (1924), Dinner at Eight (1932). In 1927, she was acting in Massachusetts, including in Cradle Snatchers with her sister Janet Beecher.

In 1906 Wyndham was in the summer stock cast at the Elitch Theatre in Denver, Colorado.

Wyndham appeared in two silent films, Your Girl and Mine, a 1914 suffrage film backed by the National American Woman Suffrage Association, and Fighting Bob (1915). Her striking fashion choices were a matter of press interest, as in the 1907 headline "Olive Wyndham's Hat Biggest in United States".

== Personal life ==
Olive Wyndham was engaged to marry lawyer Walter Kirkpatrick Brice in 1915, but the engagement was broken a few months later. She married mining engineer Andrew White Newberry in 1925. After they divorced, she married a second time to Lucien Hamilton Tyng in 1933. She was married a third time to the New Thought metaphysician and writer Harry Gaze (1878–1959) who died in a car accident en route to a speaking engagement at the Hollywood Church of Religious Science. She died in Santa Monica, California in 1971, aged 85 years.
