= James A. Herne =

American dramatist (1839–1901)

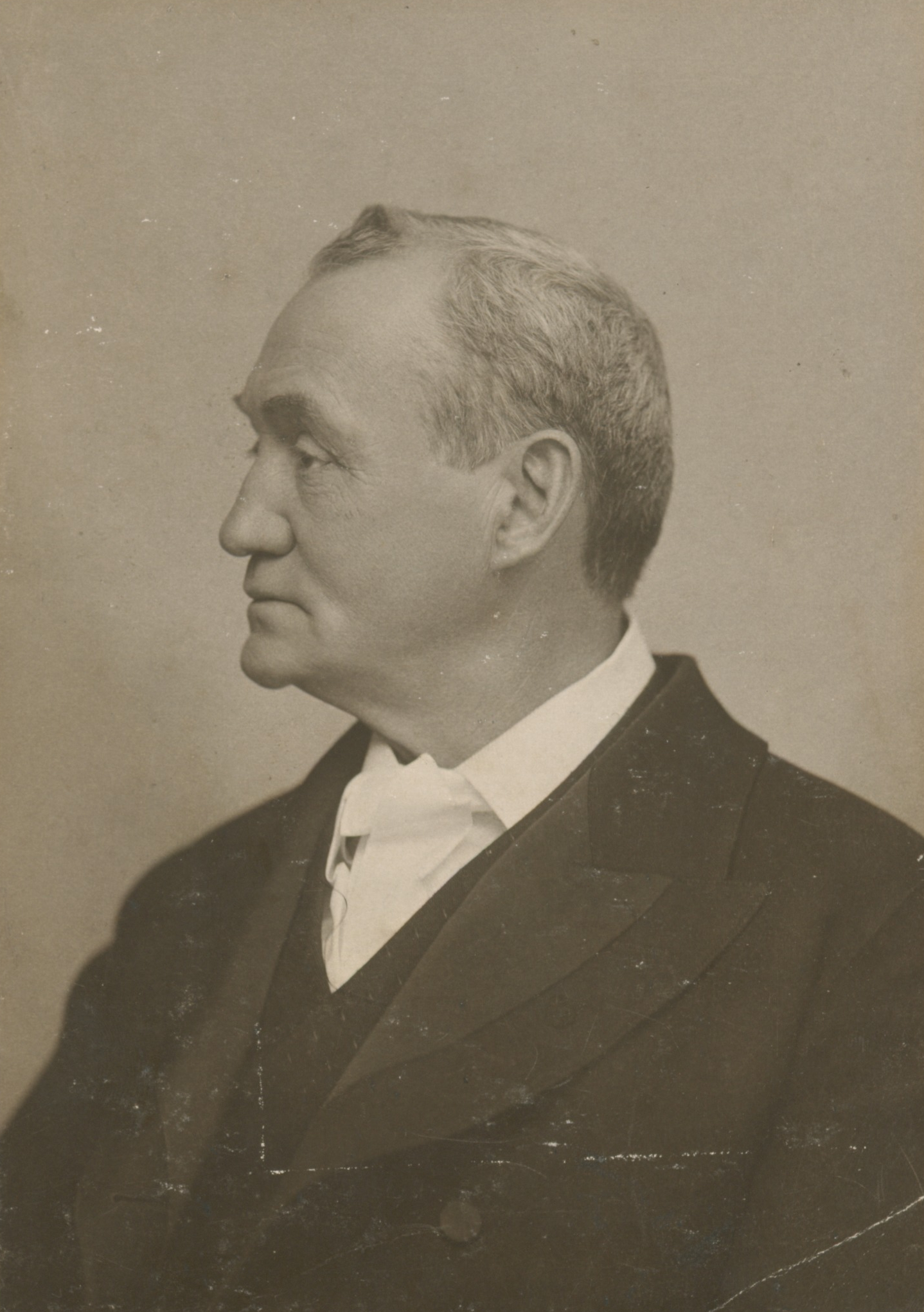
- Herne c. 1890s
- Born: James Ahearn; February 1, 1839; Cohoes, New York
- Died: June 2, 1901 (aged 62); Manhattan, New York City
- Occupations: Actor, playwright
- Spouse: Katherine Corcoran
- Children: Chrystal Herne; Julie Herne

James A. Herne (born James Ahearn; February 1, 1839 – June 2, 1901) was an American playwright and actor. He is considered by some critics to be the "American Ibsen", and his controversial play Margaret Fleming is often credited with having begun modern drama in America. Herne was a Georgist and wrote Shore Acres to promote the political economy of Henry George.

== Biography ==
=== Stage actor ===
James A. Herne was born February 1, 1839, in Cohoes, New York. His parents were poor Irish immigrants who removed him from school at age thirteen to work in a brush factory. Herne decided to become an actor the next year but was twenty before he could join a traveling troupe. He made his debut in 1859 as George in a production of Uncle Tom's Cabin in Troy, New York. He enjoyed modest success as a young actor, appearing in Baltimore and Washington, D.C., with the John Thompson Ford company in the early 1860s. He was the leading man for the Lucille Western Touring Company from 1865 to 1867. He was briefly married, in the early 1860s, to Lucille's sister Helen Western, an actress who later became romantically involved with John Wilkes Booth. Herne managed the Grand Opera House at 23rd and 8th Avenue in New York City for a season.

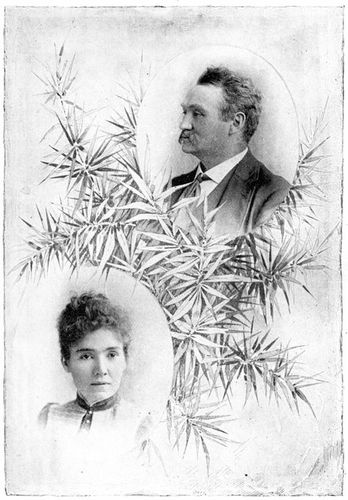
Herne and his wife Katherine Corcoran

He then moved to San Francisco in 1870 to manage several other theaters. In San Francisco, he met David Belasco, with whom he collaborated on at least three of his plays. He also met and married his second wife, actress Katherine Corcoran. The couple had five children, one son, John, and four daughters, Alma, Dorothy, Julie and Katherine Chrystal who usually went by the name Chrystal Herne. Dorothy and Julie were also actresses.

Mary Elitch Long recounted seeing Ahearn in 1889: "A pleasant episode of a visit to New York during the winter...was meeting James A. Herne. Frank Mayo, who had never seen his old friend in his masterpiece, Shore Acres, sat beside me, and during the beautiful scene where the actor, candle in hand, passes up the kitchen stairs and stops to look back, Frank gently took my hand and sighed. I saw the tears that brimmed his eyes. We were the last to leave the theatre; some blocks away he spoke for the first time: 'That was the greatest piece of acting I ever saw.' "This genuine tribute came from a man who himself was the country's idol."

=== Playwright ===
Herne was the first American playwright to incorporate dramatic realism. He ventured away from nineteenth century dramatic romance and melodrama. Much of Herne's work faded into obscurity in the twentieth century. However, he exerted a profound influence, directing American dramatic literature toward the depiction of complex socially realities. This was illustrated in his controversial play Margaret Fleming (1890). The work singled him out as an influential figure in 19th-century drama.

Herne's first successful play, Hearts of Oak, was written and produced with Belasco in 1879. After this, Herne focused mostly on writing. Of his later plays, only a handful saw financial success in his lifetime. He continued to act, often in his own works, but also in the plays of others. In 1897 Herne played Nathaniel Berry in Shore Acres at the Harlem Opera House. It was the sixth consecutive season that he portrayed this character.

== Death ==
James A. Herne died at his home, 79 Convent Avenue, in Manhattan, New York City, on June 2, 1901, at 5:00 pm of pneumonia. He initially fell ill two months earlier in Chicago, where he was appearing in his production Sag Harbor.

== Works ==
- Within an Inch of his Life with David Belasco (1879)
- Marriage by Moonlight with David Belasco (1879)
- Hearts of Oak with David Belasco (1879); from "The Mariner's Compass" by Henry Leslie
- The Minute Men (1886)
- Drifting Apart (1888)
- Margaret Fleming (1890)
- Shore Acres (1893)
- Art for Truth's Sake (essay) (1897)
- The Reverend Griffith Davenport (1899)
- Sag Harbor (1900)
