= Rogers Brothers =

Comedy double act

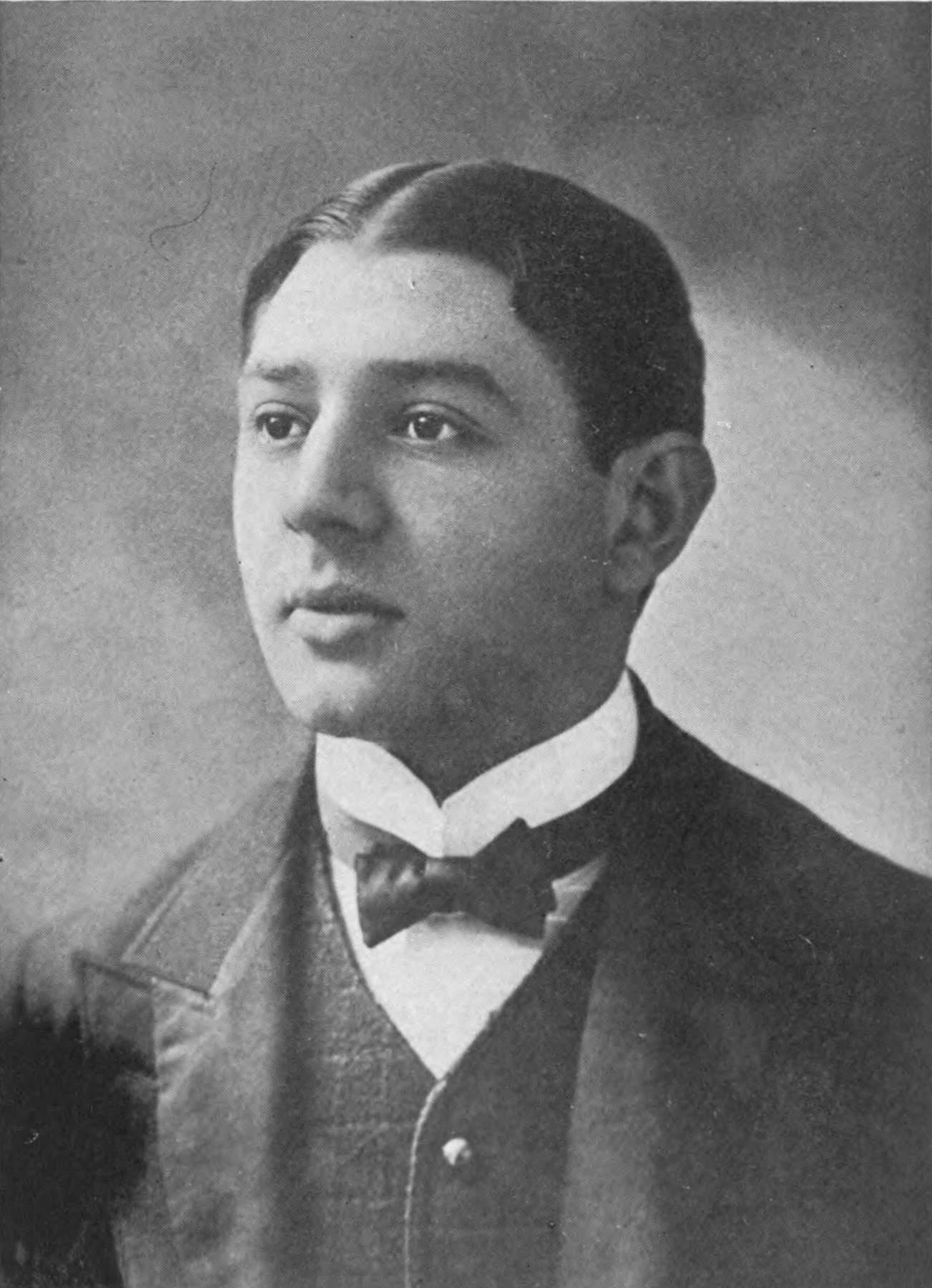
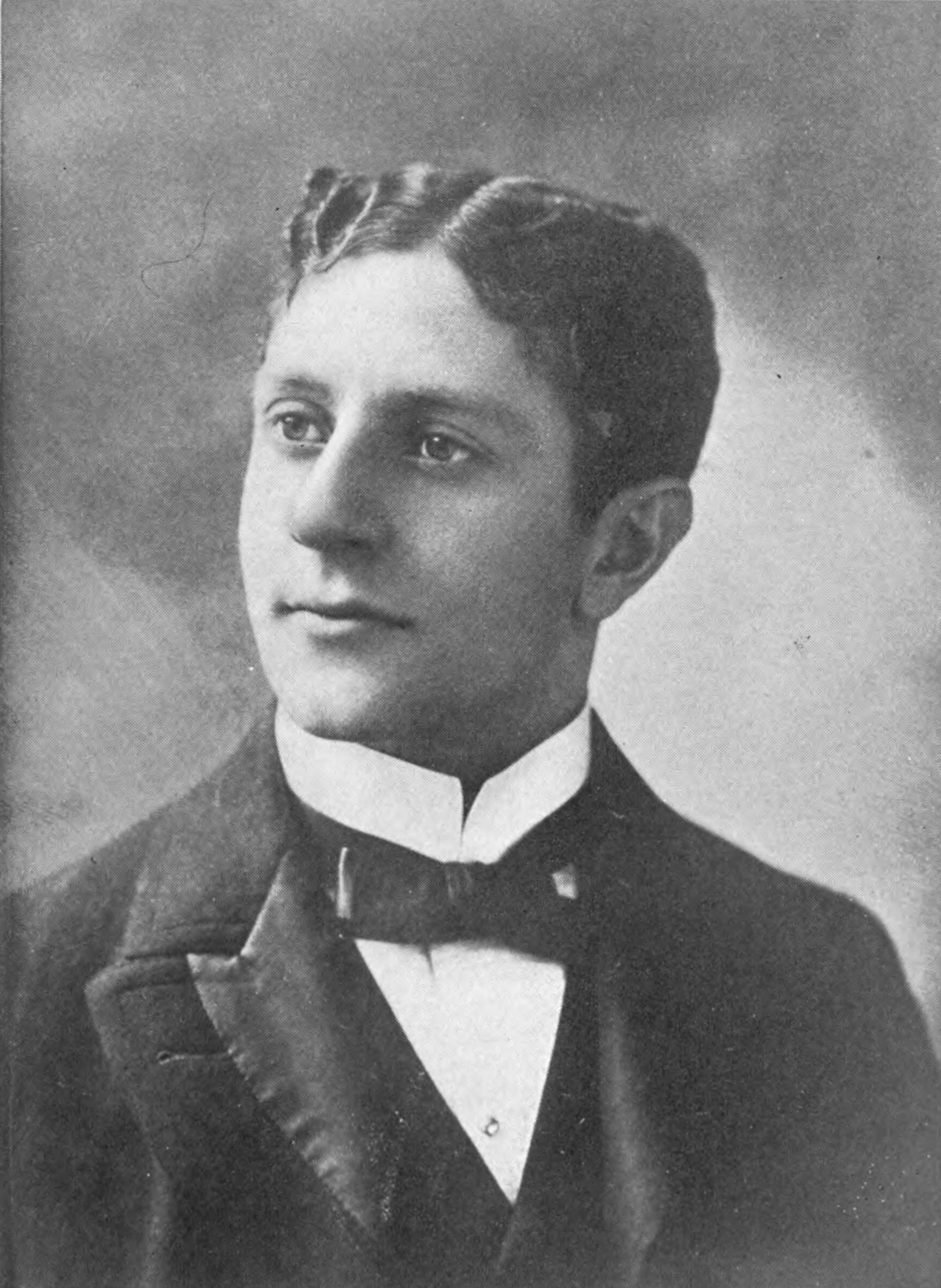
Gus (left) and Max Rogers (right)

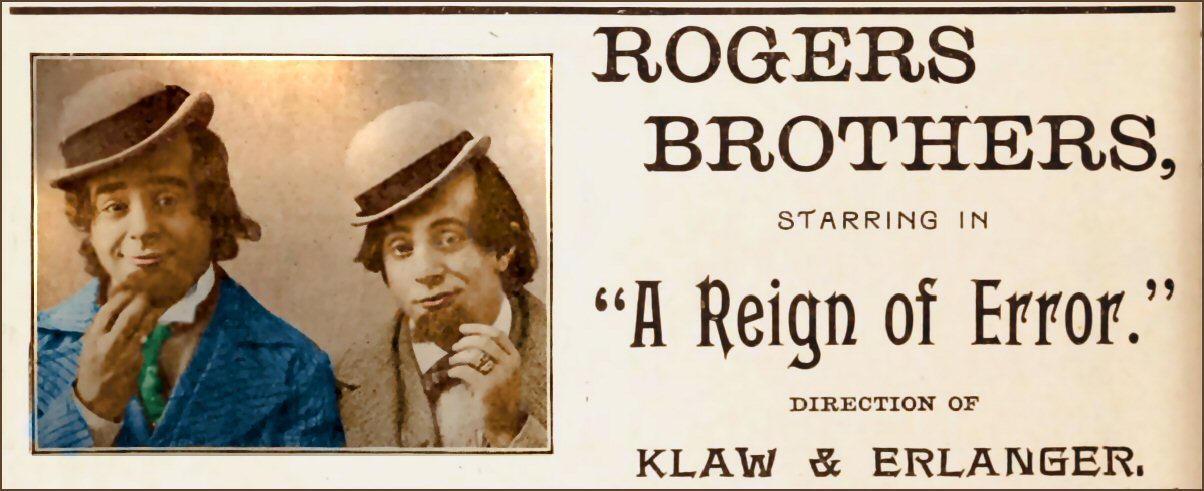
Rogers Brothers working for Klaw and Erlanger 1899.

The Rogers Brothers was a comedy double-act consisting of brothers Gus Rogers (1869–1908) and Max Rogers (1873–1932). The duo toured widely in vaudeville circuits in the United States from 1885 until Gus's death in 1908. They also starred in several Broadway musicals; most of which were created for them by the playwright John J. McNally.

== History ==
Born into a Jewish family and raised on the Lower East Side of Manhattan, the Rogers brothers were the sons of Morris and Hannah Solomon. Their father Morris was a comedian who also worked as a tailor out of a shop on Varick Street. The pair adopted the name Rodgers for use on the stage.

The Rogers Brothers made their stage debut at the Bowery Theatre in 1885. Early on in their career they formed a partnership with the playwright John J. McNally, beginning with the play Revels (written in 1880). McNally wrote numerous stage works for the duo, including the books for several Broadway musicals as well as the scripts for many of their touring vaudeville shows. Some of these included the musicals The Rogers Brothers in Wall Street (1899), The Rogers Brothers in Central Park (1900–01), The Rogers Brothers in Washington (1901), The Rogers Brothers in Harvard (1902), The Rogers Brothers in London (1903–04), The Rogers Brothers in Paris (1904), The Rogers Brothers in Ireland (1905–06), and The Rogers Brothers in Panama (1907); most of which had Broadway runs in addition to touring nationally.

The Rogers Brothers were considered something of a rival to Weber & Fields. Their highly successful travel or locale plays and musicals, staged in different towns and countries, were popular with vaudeville audiences. Gus's early death in 1908 ended the brothers' team partnership. The Rogers successful run of theme musicals anticipated the much later teaming of Bob Hope and Bing Crosby in their 'Road' movies.

Gus's wife was the actress Maud Raymond. She starred in several of the Rogers Brothers shows.
