= Salvation Nell =

Salvation Nell may refer to:

- Salvation Nell, a 1908 Broadway play by Edward Sheldon, adapted three times for film
- Salvation Nell (1915 film), starring Beatriz Michelena
- Salvation Nell (1921 film), featuring Pauline Starke
- Salvation Nell (1931 film), starring Helen Chandler
