= California Motion Picture Corporation =

American film company

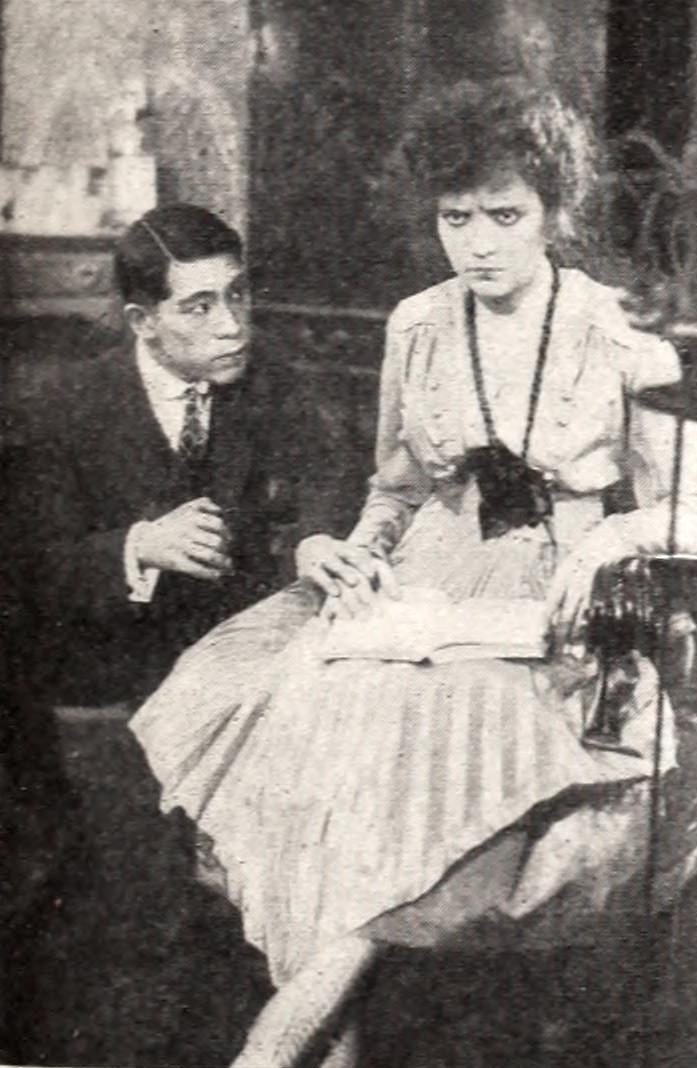
Still from Who's Your Servant? (1920) with Yukio Aoyama and Lois Wilson

California Motion Picture Corporation was a film company based in San Rafael, California, in Marin County during the silent film era. The company lasted from 1914 until January 1916 when it went bankrupt. It was subsequently renamed and lasted until 1920. It produced at least 15 films. The film company is known for its feature-length films about early California history. Alex E. Beyfuss managed the company.

The Marin County Library has a digital collection related to the studio. Their productions included Salomy Jane (1914), Mrs. Wiggs of the Cabbage Patch (1914), Mignon (1915), and Who's Your Servant? (1920). Frank Erlanger was one of the actors who worked for the studio. Salomy Jane survives in its entirety. George E. Middleton was a director with the studio and Beatriz Michelena a leading actress. Harold Entwistle and William Nigh also directed films for the company.

An announcement of the company's incorporation gives a San Francisco main office address at 356 Pine Street and lists the board of directors as: James Woods, manager of the St. Francis Hotel; Baldwin Wood, attorney; Charles Payne, President Payne Real Estate Company; Thomas B. Eastland, President Coast Realty Co.; A. M. Johnson, Attorney; and Robin Y. Hayne, Capitalist as well as officer from a steamship company and Pacific Telephonen and Telegraph. It was billed as the largest film company in the west.

== History ==
Stage actress Michelena married George E. Middleton, a prominent San Francisco automobile dealer, on Sunday, March 3, 1907. The private wedding took place at 232 Divisadero Street, the home of the parents of bridesmaid Margaret McGovern, "a lifelong friend of the bride". The couple spent a few weeks in Los Angeles for their honeymoon.

Middleton was the manager of the local Middleton Motor Car Company and the son of a California timber baron. He introduced Michelena to his society friends and business partners, including the trustees of Charles Crocker's estate who had rebuilt the St. Francis Hotel after the 1906 earthquake and fire. Middleton set up the California Motion Picture Company in San Rafael in 1912 for the purpose of shooting promotional footage of the automobiles he was selling. He determined that his pretty wife could star in movies made by his company. By 1914, Middleton and Michelena were making three major films at the same time.

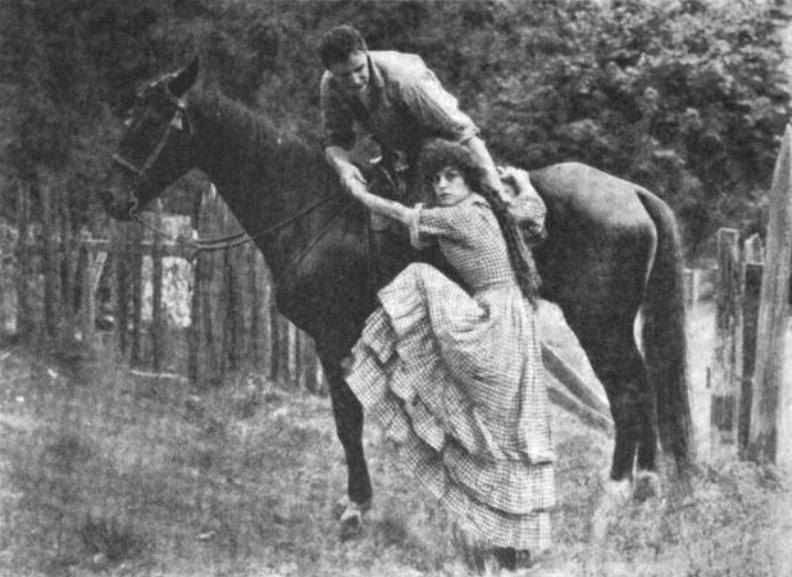
During the shooting of Salomy Jane, Michelena posed for a publicity still with leading man House Peters.

The first feature completed by CMPC was Salomy Jane, screened initially at the St. Francis Hotel by invitation only. Michelena's role was Bret Harte's Salomy Jane Clay, an energetic daughter of an emigrant miner. She is wooed by four men but prefers a fifth played by British heartthrob House Peters.

The movie saw limited nationwide distribution and was judged a hit by viewers who were impressed by the wild California scenery: giant redwood trees, winding roads hugging rocky bluffs and the Russian River Michelena's dominant portrayal of the title role was also an appeal. Journalist Josephine Clifford McCracken wrote of her in the June 1915 issue of Overland Monthly:

"Daughter of a renowned tenor of San Francisco's pioneer days, herself a prima donna with an assured place on the modern operatic stage, a girl with a wealth of artistic tradition behind her, Miss Michelena's gifts do not stop there. She has rare beauty, vivacity, wit, intellectual attainments and athletic grace."

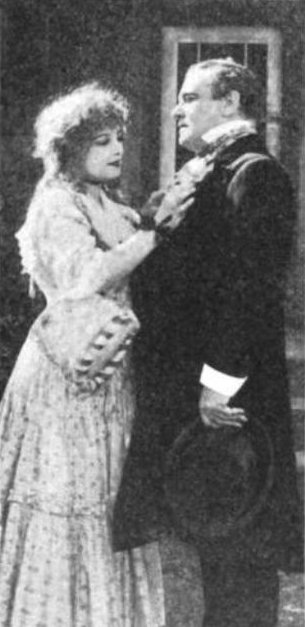
Michelena and actor Andrew Robson in The Lily of Poverty Flat

One CMPC shooting location was on family property near Boulder Creek, California, where Middleton's father had established a timber holding now known as the Middleton Tract. Other filming locations included undeveloped portions of Sonoma, Santa Cruz and Marin counties. In San Rafael, the studio boasted a large glass-walled and -roofed building that let in light but not wind so that shooting for indoor scenes could take place in full light without the telltale flapping of tablecloths and clothing blown by gusts. Considered expensive at the time, the company used a US$ 1,250 Bell & Howell movie camera, worth about $38,900 in current value. The camera held two reels of film so that two negatives were made of each scene. A second $700 camera provided a third reel of the same scene, from another perspective.

Even though Salomy Jane did not return a profit (likely due to second-string distribution channels), its favorable reception convinced Middleton that his wife could challenge the world's top movie star, Mary Pickford, and almost all CMPC movies had her as their star. Unfortunately, Michelena's ego expanded with the glowing reviews of her skill, and her demands for star treatment brought heavier expenses to productions that continued to lose money. Mignon, The Lily of Poverty Flat, A Phyllis of the Sierras, Salvation Nell and The Rose of the Misty Pool all failed to turn a profit, and a lavish production of Faust which was in production in 1915 was given until the end of the year to be completed. Faust was not done by January 1916, and CMPC president Herbert Payne shut the film company down and filed for bankruptcy. Faust was never released.

Middleton and Michelena bought the bankrupt film company for "a few thousand dollars" in 1917 and renamed it Michelena Studios. Their new company was called Beatriz Michelena Features, and shooting began on their next feature-length film, Just Squaw. Michelena's lead character was a white woman raised by American Indians, a woman who does not realize her racial heritage until after she falls into forbidden love with a white man. The movie played for only a week in San Francisco in 1919, and did not return a profit.

The moviemakers' new distributor, Robertson-Cole, was unable to find the right market for Heart of Juanita and The Flame of Hellgate in 1920. American audiences had grown more sophisticated, yet Michelena Studios was still employing their earlier production techniques. After shooting The Flame of Hellgate, Middleton and Michelena stopped making movies altogether. She returned to her singing performances and he returned to his car sales. They reportedly divorced in the mid-1920s, though Middleton told the 1930 US Census that they were married. The union produced no children.

== Filmography ==
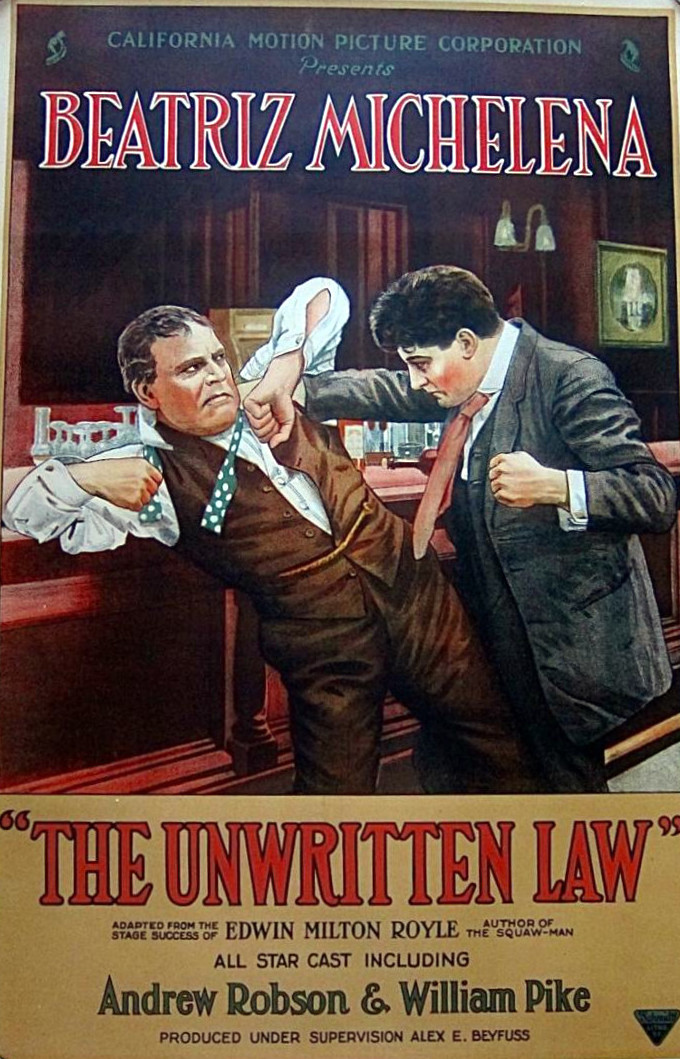
Poster for Unwritten Law (1916)

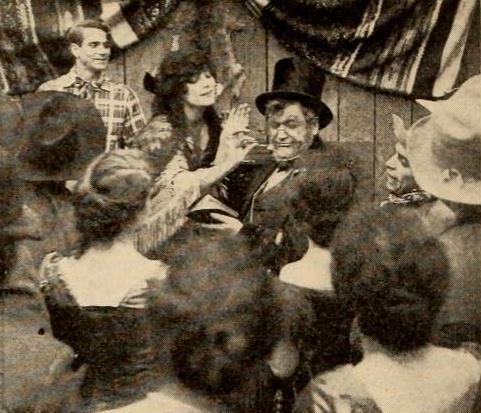
Still from Heart of Juanita (1919)

- Salomy Jane (1914)
- Mrs. Wiggs of the Cabbage Patch (1914)
- The Lily of Poverty Flat (1915)
- Mignon (1915)
- Salvation Nell (1915)
- The Rose of Misty Pool (1915)
- A Phyllis of the Sierras (1915)
- Unwritten Law (1916), advertized as an adaptation of an Edwin Milton Royle play
- The Woman Who Dared (1916)
- Heart of Juanita (1919)
- Who's Your Servant? (1920)
- The Flame of Hellgate (1920) a Beatriz Michelena Features production

== See also ==
- List of World Film films
