= Mrs. Wiggs of the Cabbage Patch (1914 film) =

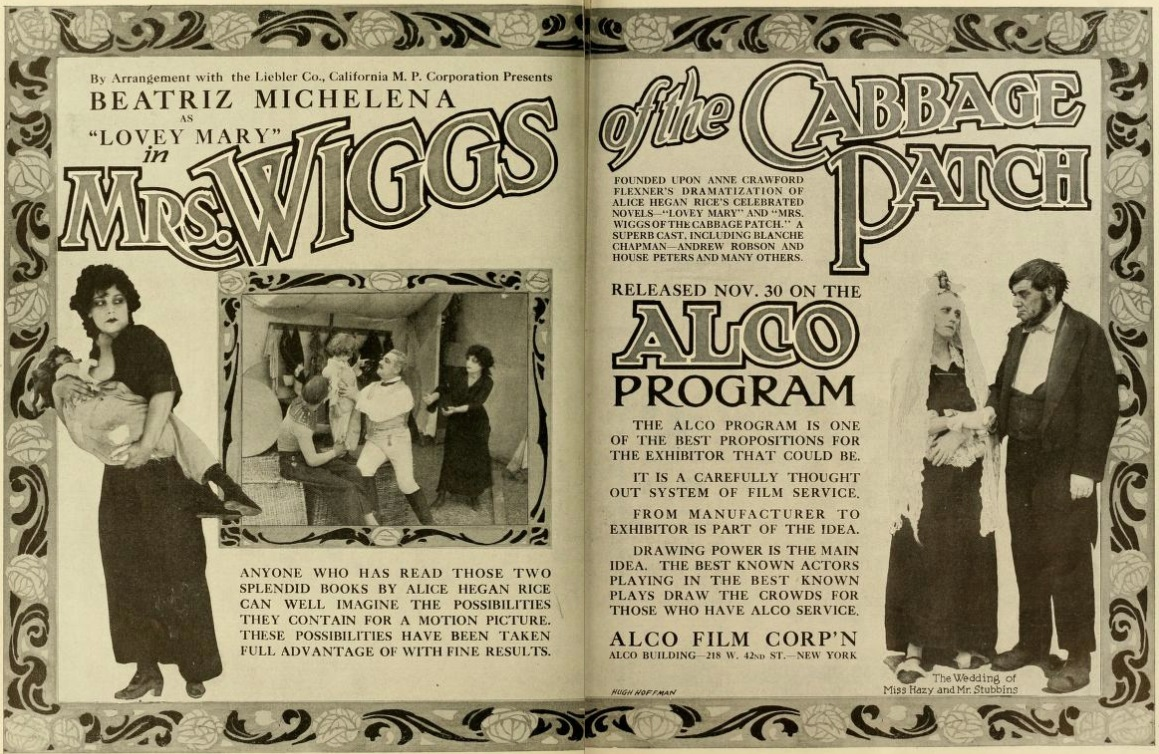
- Directed by: Harold Entwistle
- Written by: Alice Hegan Rice (novel); Anne Crawford Flexner (play)
- Produced by: George E. Middleton
- Starring: Beatriz Michelena; Blanche Chapman; House Peters
- Cinematography: Arthur Powelson
- Production company: California Motion Picture Corporation
- Distributed by: Alco Films; World Film
- Release date: December 31, 1914
- Running time: 5 reels
- Country: United States
- Languages: Silent; English intertitles

Mrs. Wiggs of the Cabbage Patch is a 1914 American silent comedy drama film directed by Harold Entwistle and starring Beatriz Michelena, Blanche Chapman and House Peters. It is based on the 1903 play by Anne Crawford Flexner, which itself is taken from the 1901 novel of the same name by Alice Hegan Rice.

== Plot ==
Mr. and Mrs. Wiggs, prior to their marriage, worked as a coachman and housekeeper to Colonel Vanderhurst, who removed his son, Jack, from his will for marrying a woman connected to the circus. Years later, Jack and his wife both pass away, leaving Lovey Mary with Jack's wife's sister and her sister's husband, a temperamental circus proprietor. Along with Lovey Mary goes Jack's marriage certificate, Lovey Mary's birth certificate, and a locket with a portrait of Jack and his wife.

Now, Mr. and Mrs. Wiggs are married with five children, suffering greatly, especially due to strikes at Mr. Wiggs’ work. This place is controlled by wealthy politician Murphy, whose stepson Bob pities the strikers, specifically Mr. Wiggs and his family. Bob becomes an attorney and Mr. Wiggs leaves the town in search of other work, meeting Lovey Mary's uncle, the circus proprietor. With Mr. Wiggs absent, Mrs. Wiggs struggles greatly with poverty as she tries to take care of her family alone.

Years pass, and Mrs. Wiggs continues struggling. Colonel Vanderhurst decides to make a will in Lovey Mary's favor after regretting his harshness with his son. He releases advertisements to find Lovey Mary, which Mary's uncle finds and plans to turn in Lovey Mary as his own daughter to receive the inheritance.

Mr. Wiggs falls in love with a circus performer and has a child named Tommy with her, who Lovey Mary becomes fond of. When her uncle tells her the plan, she runs away with Tommy. Her uncle chases after her but she is rescued by Bob. She has another close call with her uncle, but escapes by train with Tommy, and stops near the Cabbage Patch. Noticed by one of the Wiggs children, she is taken to Mrs. Wiggs house. Soon, she is kidnapped by her uncle with Tommy still at the house.

Her uncle takes her to claim the inheritance, but Bob's firm represents the Colonel's estate and Bob becomes suspicious. He visits the circus, which is currently in the Cabbage Patch, and goes to Mrs. Wiggs, discovering the truth.

Bob follows Lovey Mary's uncle under disguise and saves her as she is about to be murdered. The two later run into Mr. Wiggs and convince him to return to Mrs. Wiggs, who forgives him for abandoning her and their family, and Bob and Lovey Mary announce their decision to get married.

== Production and Reception ==
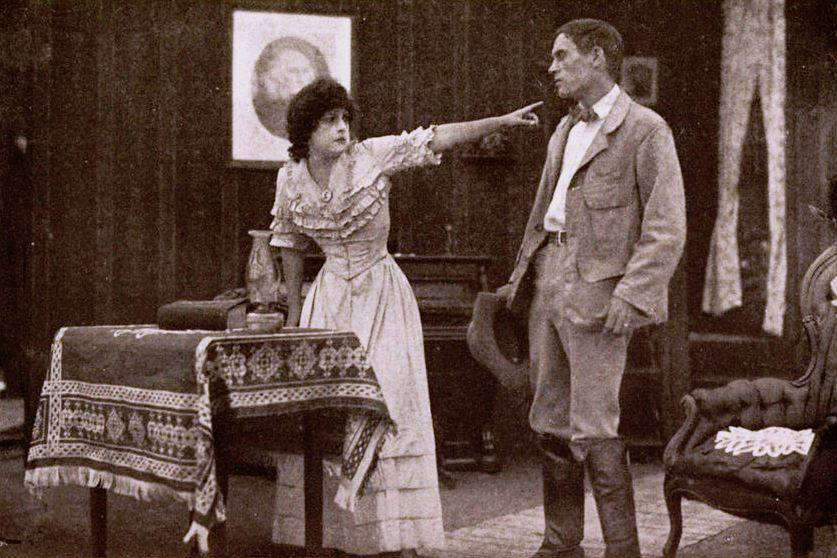
Beatriz Michelena in Salomy Jane in which she acted alongside Mrs. Wiggs of the Cabbage Patch co-star House Peters.

Beatriz Michelena, who played Lovey Mary, and House Peters, who played Bob, had been on a film prior to the filming of Mrs. Wiggs of the Cabbage Patch with the California Motion Picture Corporation called Salomy Jane. Though Michelena held a special relationship with the California Motion Picture Corporation and received star treatment, she felt upstaged by Peters due to his acting style, which caused many problems during the production of Mrs. Wiggs of the Cabbage Patch. Michelena did not like play the film was based from and was angry that her role of Lovey Mary was not the title role, believing her role was not glamorous enough. Peters also disliked his lack of screen time as Bob. This led to an argument between the two and Peters storming off and never returning to the set. Producer George E. Middleton attempted to uphold continuity without the missing scenes, the gaps were too noticeable, and the film never became a success.

== Cast ==
- Beatriz Michelena as Lovey Mary
- Blanche Chapman as Mrs. Wiggs
- Andrew Robson as Hiram Wiggs
- House Peters as Bob
- La Belle Carmen as Wire Walker
- Belle Bennett as Undetermined Role
- William Pike as Undetermined Role

== Bibliography ==
- Goble, Alan. The Complete Index to Literary Sources in Film. Walter de Gruyter, 1999.
