= The Lily of Poverty Flat =

1915 film by George E. Middleton

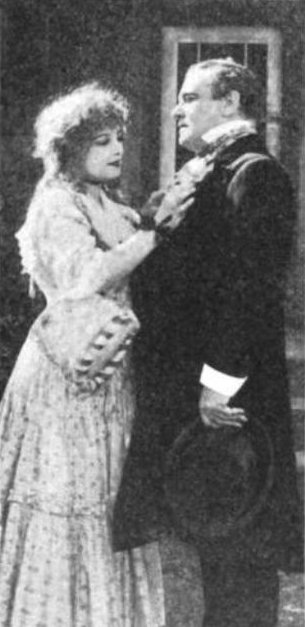
Beatriz Michelena as Lily and Andrew Robson (actor) as Jack Hamlin in a publicity still made for the film published in a feature article on the film in Overland Monthly

The Lily of Poverty Flat was a book by Bret Harte adapted into the 1915 film of the same name. The plot features a fictional Northern California mining town called Poverty Flat. The movie version was filmed near Santa Cruz, California. Described as a genteel Western, the film reportedly met with meagre box office results. It was directed by George E. Middleton.

== See also ==
- Salomy Jane (1914 film)
