= Mignon (1915 film) =

1915 film by William Nigh

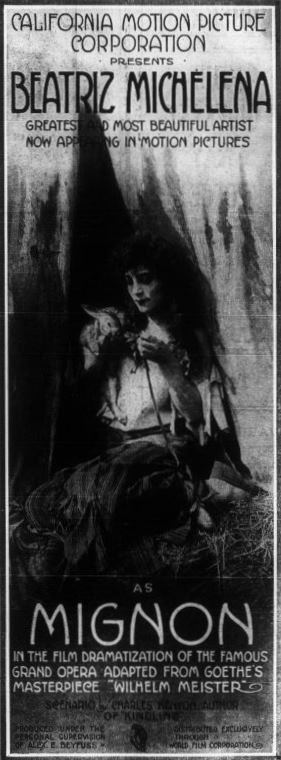
- Advertisement
- Directed by: William Nigh
- Written by: Charles Kenyon (scenario)
- Based on: Mignon by Jules Barbier and Michel Carré
- Produced by: Alexander E. Beyfuss; George E. Middleton
- Starring: Beatriz Michelena; Robert House Peters; Clara Beyers; Belle Bennett; Ernest Joy
- Cinematography: Arthur Pawelson
- Production company: California Motion Picture Corporation
- Distributed by: World Film
- Release date: January 18, 1915
- Running time: 5 reels
- Country: United States
- Language: Silent (English intertitles)

Mignon is a 1915 American silent drama film directed by William Nigh with production supervised by Alexander E. Beyfuss. It is based on the 1866 opera Mignon that was from the 1795-96 novel Wilhelm Meisters Lehrjahre by Johann Wolfgang von Goethe.

== Plot ==
The nobleman Lothario seduces Musette, the daughter of Giarno, the leader of the nearby Gypsy camp. When Musette learns that Lothario is married and has a baby, Mignon, she jumps off a cliff. For revenge, Giarno kidnaps Mignon. After Lothario's wife dies of grief, Lothario becomes a mad, wandering minstrel.

When Mignon is sixteen, the young nobleman Wilhelm Meister, seeing her mistreatment, buys Mignon from Giarno. Mignon falls in love with Wilhelm, but she believes that he loves the actress Filina. At a fete, Filina locks Mignon, whom Lothario has befriended, into her room. Filina traps Wilhelm into proposing, but as he announces their engagement, Lothario, acting on Mignon's earlier suggestions, sets the castle on fire. Wilhelm rescues Mignon, but because she still believes that he loves Filina, she leaves with Lothario. When an innkeeper recognizes Lothario and shows him a piece of the baby Mignon's belt, Lothario's memory returns. As Mignon has the other piece, she is revealed to be his daughter. Wilhelm finds them, and he and Mignon vow to marry.

== Cast ==
- Beatriz Michelena as Mignon
- Robert House Peters as Wilhelm Meister
- Clara Beyers as Filina
- Belle Bennett as Musette
- Ernest Joy as Laertes
- Emil Krushe as Giarno
- Andrew Robson as Lothario
- Baby Wallace as Mignon (as a child)
- Frank Hollins as Lothario's servant
- Mrs. Frank Hollins as Baby Mignon's nurse
- Harold B. Meade as Lothario's servant
- Demetrios Mitsoras as Innkeeper
- William Pike as Frederick
- Rollin Warwick as Baron Rosenberg

=== Uncredited ===
- George Cheseboro
- Ted Edlin
