= Salvation Nell (1921 film) =

1921 film

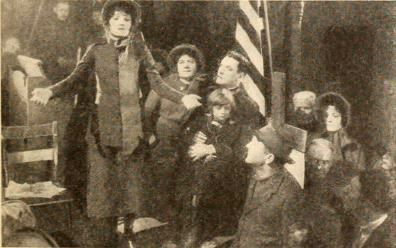
- Film still
- Directed by: Kenneth Webb
- Written by: Dorothy Farnum (adaptation)
- Based on: Salvation Nell by Edward Sheldon
- Produced by: Whitman Bennett
- Starring: Pauline Starke
- Cinematography: Ernest Haller
- Distributed by: Associated First National Pictures
- Release date: June 26, 1921
- Running time: 70 minutes
- Country: United States
- Language: Silent (English intertitles)

Salvation Nell is a 1921 American silent drama film produced by Whitman Bennett and distributed by Associated First National Pictures, later First National Pictures. It was directed by Kenneth Webb and stars Pauline Starke. The film is based on a successful 1908 Broadway play by Edward Sheldon that starred Minnie Maddern Fiske.

This film survives in the George Eastman Museum and the Library of Congress collections.

An earlier 1915 version with Beatriz Michelena is now lost. A 1931 talkie version made by Tiffany Pictures survives.

== Cast ==
- Pauline Starke as Nell Saunders
- Joe King as Jim Platt (credited as Joseph King)
- Gypsy O'Brien as Myrtle Hawes
- Edward Langford as Major Williams
- Evelyn Carter Carrington as Hallelujah (credited as Evelyn C. Carrington)
- Maggie
- Charles McDonald as Sid McGovern
- Matthew Betz as Al McGovern
- Marie Haynes as Hash House Sal
- Arthur Earle as Giffen (credited as A. Earl)
- William Nally as Callahan
- Lawrence Johnson as Jimmie
