= Al Lichtman =

Film producer and businessman

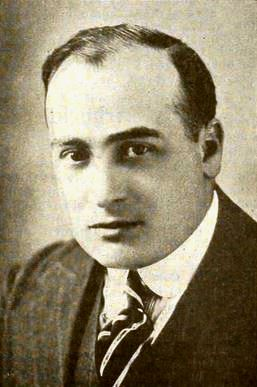
- Lichtman in 1919
- Born: Alexander Lichtman; April 9, 1888; Monok, Hungary
- Died: February 20, 1958 (aged 69); Los Angeles, California, U.S.
- Occupations: Film salesman; film producer

Alexander Lichtman (April 9, 1888 – February 20, 1958) was a film salesman, occasionally working as a film producer. He was president of United Artists in 1935. He proposed the process of block booking to Adolph Zukor, which became industry standard practice. Variety called him "perhaps the greatest film salesman in the history of the business".

== Biography ==
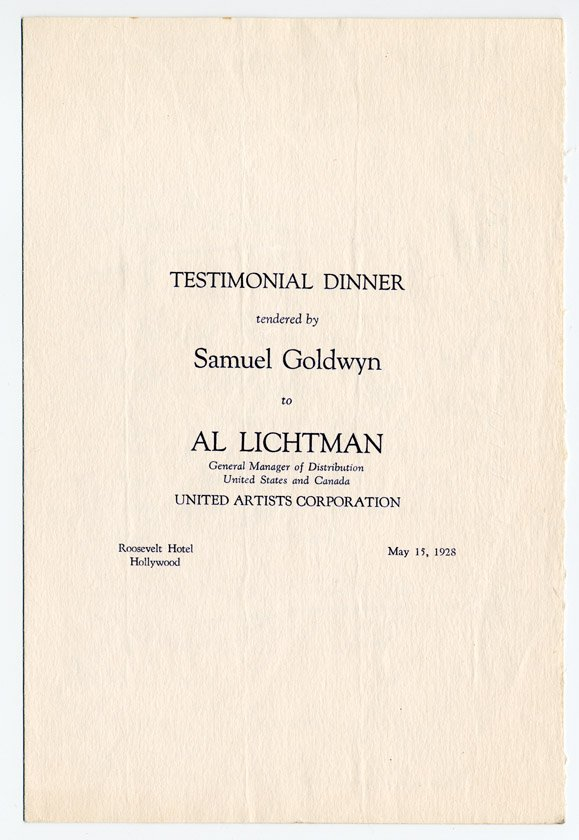
Al Lichtman Tribute menu cover

Lichtman was born in Monok, Hungary. His parents were Joseph Lichtman and Pepe (a.k.a. Josephine) Zuckermandel. The family emigrated to the US when Lichtman was 10 but his parents died within the next 3 years.

He started work as an usher at a burlesque house in New York and later joined the circus and also gave monologues for Gus Sun's Gus Sun Time before joining Powers Motion Pictures Co. in New York. He tried to persuade Adolph Zukor to let him produce a film of The Count of Monte Cristo but was instead hired as a field manager for Zukor at Famous Players in 1912, gaining a 10% interest in the company. Two years later, he left to form his own distribution company, Alco Films, however it entered bankruptcy a year later when his partner absconded with most of the assets so Lichtman rejoined Zukor to form Artcraft Pictures. Alco was reorganized as Metro Pictures. Artcraft was later merged with Paramount and others into Famous Players–Lasky with Lichtman becoming general manager. Lichtman suggested to Zukor that the studio produce 52 films a year and that they introduce a block booking system to sell all their product to exhibitors as a bundle, which became industry practice.

In 1921 he joined United Artists but left to become president of Preferred Pictures in 1923. He rejoined United Artists as sales manager in 1926 and, following the death of Hiram Abrams, Lichtman was made vice president in 1927, heading domestic distribution. He was promoted to president of the company in 1935, but resigned after only a few months due to a fallout with Sam Goldwyn over the production of Barbary Coast (1935).

In November of that same year he joined MGM as a special sales adviser and became an executive producer with them in 1938. He helped reorganize MGM and closed the deal with David O. Selznick to release Gone With the Wind (1939) and oversaw a successful period at the studio. He was also an executive producer on The Wizard of Oz (1939). He left MGM in 1949 due to poor health caused by his asthma but was persuaded to join 20th Century Fox in 1950 and became head of distribution and stayed there until his retirement in 1956 due to ill health. He was prominent in Fox's launch of CinemaScope. He returned to Fox as a producer a year later, producing The Young Lions (1958) which was released after his death.

He died at his home in Los Angeles, California, following a coronary occlusion. Lichtman has a "Star" on the Hollywood Walk of Fame.
