= CMPC =

CMPC may refer to:

- California Motion Picture Corporation, a film company based in San Rafael, California
- CMPC (company) also known as "Compañía Manufacturera de Papeles y Cartones", a pulp and paper company in Chile
- Confederation of Mountain Peoples of the Caucasus, a militarized political organization in the Caucasus region, active between 1989 and 2000
