= Scratched =

Scratched may refer to:

== Film ==
- Scratched (1916 film)
- Scratched (2005 film) with Steven O'Donnell (Australian actor)

== Music ==
- Scratched, album by Justin Tranter
- Scratched (Jesus Jones album), compilation album for the Japan market
- "Scratched", song by Belita Woods on French DJ/producer Étienne de Crécy 's Tempovision album

== See also ==
- Scratch (disambiguation)
