= The Woman Who Dared =

The Woman Who Dared may refer to:

- The Woman Who Dared (1916 film), American film directed by George E. Middleton for California Motion Picture Corporation
- The Woman Who Dared (1944 film), French film directed by Jean Grémillon
- The Woman Who Dared (1933 film), American film directed by Millard Webb
