= Douglas Bronston =

American screenwriter

- Occupations: screenwriter and writer

Douglas Bronston (1887 – 1951) was an American screenwriter and writer.

== Biography ==
Born in 1887 in Richmond, Kentucky, Bronston worked at newspapers before joining the Balboa Amusement Producing Company's scenario department as one of several newspaper men recruited into the film industry. He wrote the stories for various films and film serials as well as screenplays based on stories written by others.

He died in 1951 in Santa Monica, California.

== Filmography ==
- Neal of the Navy (1915)
- The Grip of Evil (1916), a serial
- Scratched (1916)
- The Inspirations of Harry Larrabee (1917) based on the short story "The Inspirations of Harry Larrabee" by Howard Fielding (a pseudonym of Charles Witherle Hooke)
- Thieves (1919)
- The Web of Chance (1919)
- An Amateur Devil (1920)
- She Couldn't Help It (1920), with Channing Pollock
- The Outside Woman (1921)
- The House That Jazz Built (1921)
- The Oregon Trail (1923), a serial, one of the writers
- An Enemy of Men (1925)
- Shameful Behavior? (1926)
- Redheads Preferred (1926)
- When the Wife's Away (1926)
- The Thrill Hunter (1926)
- Snowbound (1927)
- Husband Hunters (1927)
