= Alias Julius Caesar =

1922 film directed by Charles Ray

- Directed by: Charles Ray
- Screenplay by: Edward Withers
- Story by: Richard Andres
- Produced by: Charles Ray
- Starring: Charles Ray; Barbara Bedford; William Scott; Robert Fernandez; Fred Miller; Eddie Gribbon
- Cinematography: George Rizard
- Edited by: Harry L. Decker
- Production company: Charles Ray Productions
- Distributed by: Associated First National Pictures
- Release date: July 1922
- Running time: 50 minutes
- Country: United States
- Language: English

Alias Julius Caesar is a 1922 American silent comedy film directed by Charles Ray and written by Edward Withers. The film stars Charles Ray, Barbara Bedford, William Scott, Robert Fernandez, Fred Miller and Eddie Gribbon. The film was released in July 1922, by Associated First National Pictures.

== Cast ==
- Charles Ray as Billy Barnes
- Barbara Bedford as Helen
- William Scott as Harry
- Robert Fernandez as Tom
- Fred Miller as Dick
- Eddie Gribbon as 'Nervy' Norton
- Tom Wilson as Mose
- Harvey Clark as M. Dumas
- Gus Thomas as Harrington Whitney
- Milton Ross as Police Sergeant
- S.J. Bingham as Detective
- Phil Dunham as Billy's Valet
- Bert Offord as Janitor

== Preservation ==
With no holdings located in archives, Alias Julius Caesar is considered a lost film.
