= Jackie (1921 film) =

1921 film directed by John Ford

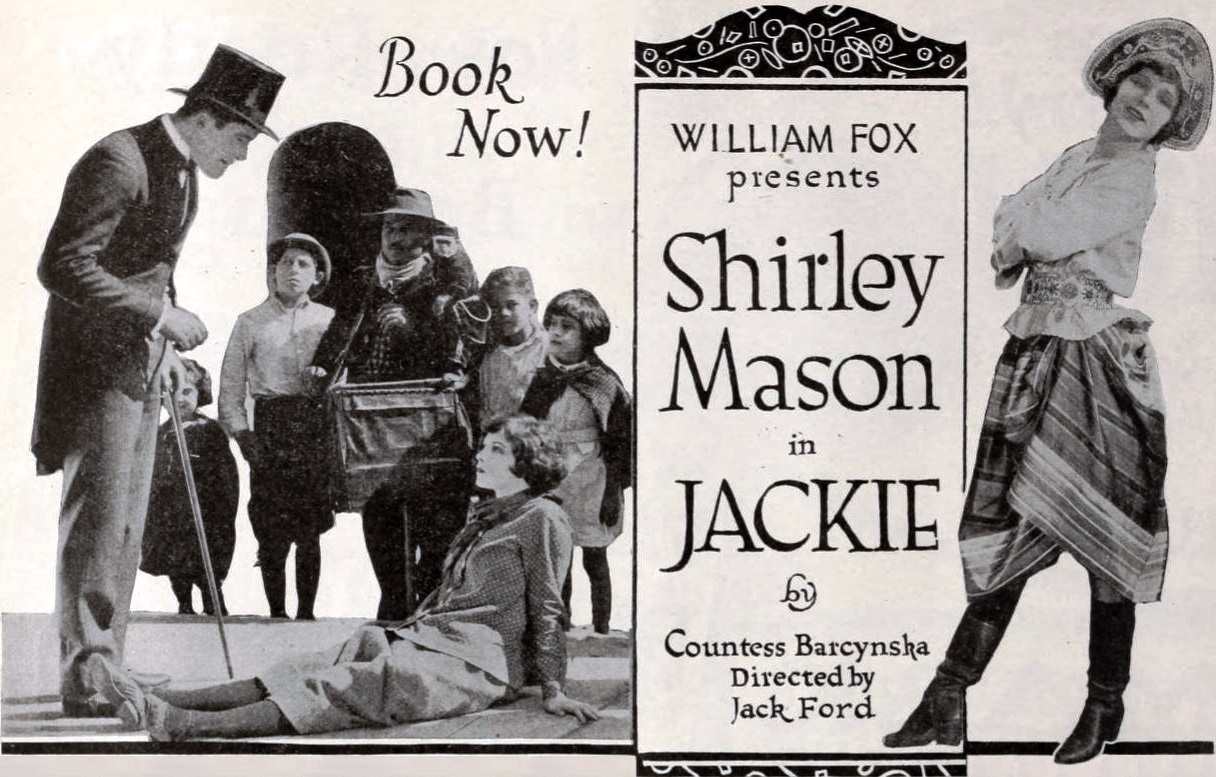
- Advertisement
- Directed by: John Ford
- Written by: Helena Buczynska; Dorothy Yost
- Produced by: William Fox
- Starring: Shirley Mason; William Scott
- Cinematography: George Schneiderman
- Distributed by: Fox Film Corporation
- Release date: November 27, 1921
- Running time: 50 minutes
- Country: United States
- Language: Silent (English intertitles)

Jackie is a 1921 American silent drama film directed by John Ford. The film is considered to be lost.

== Plot ==
As described in a film magazine, Jacqueline, an orphaned daughter of a famous Russian dancer, has been raised by a French woman who runs a cheap dancing school. Called Jackie for short, her foster mother contracts her to a rough, uncouth showman, Bill Bowman, who ill treats her. When Bill tries to force his way into her room, he is struck down by Benny, a cripple. Jackie and Benny go back to London where they accidentally run into Mervyn Carter, who had previously befriended Jackie. Mervyn arranges for Benny to be sent to a hospital and Jackie to a noted dancing master. She obtains a role in a London show and becomes engaged to Mervyn. Bill shows up and demands that Jackie return with him until her contract is fulfilled. She buys herself out of the contract by paying Bill 500 pounds, and eventually marries Mervyn.

== Cast ==
- Shirley Mason as Jackie
- William Scott as Mervyn Carter
- Harry Carter as Bill Bowman
- Georgie Stone as Benny
- John Cook as Winter
- Elsie Bambrick as Millie

== See also ==
- List of lost films
