= William Scott (actor) =

American actor

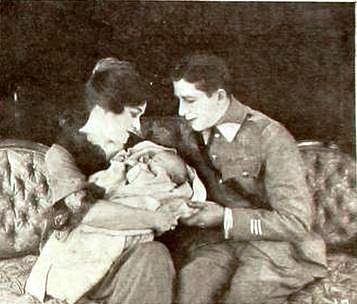
- Gladys Brockwell and Scott in White Lies (1920)
- Born: August 1, 1893; Minneapolis, Minnesota, U.S.
- Died: August 22, 1967 (aged 74); Los Angeles, California, U.S.
- Occupation: Actor
- Years active: 1913–1934

William Scott (August 1, 1893 – August 22, 1967) was an American actor of the silent era. He appeared in 90 films between 1913 and 1934. He was born in Minneapolis, Minnesota, and died in Los Angeles, California.

== Partial filmography ==
- A Man of Sorrow (1916)
- Amarilly of Clothes-Line Alley (1918)
- The Still Alarm (1918)
- The City of Purple Dreams (1918)
- Thieves (1919)
- Who's Your Servant? (1920)
- The Mother of His Children (1920)
- Jackie (1921)
- Hickville to Broadway (1921)
- Partners of Fate (1921)
- A Voice in the Dark (1921)
- Deserted at the Altar (1922)
- Alias Julius Caesar (1922)
- Only a Shop Girl (1922)
- His Last Race (1923)
- The Fourth Musketeer (1923)
- Yesterday's Wife (1923)
- Innocence (1923)
- Not a Drum Was Heard (1924)
- Against All Odds (1924)
- Dante's Inferno (1924)
- Beyond the Border (1925)
- After Business Hours (1925)
- The Light of Western Stars (1925)
- The Great Jewel Robbery (1925)
- The Earth Woman (1926)
- By Whose Hand? (1927)
- Smoke Bellew (1929)
- Daughters of Desire (1929)
- Caught Plastered (1931)
- Hotel Continental (1932)
- Come on Danger! (1932)
- Strangers of the Evening (1932)
- The Last Mile (1932)
