= Salvation Nell (1931 film) =

1931 film directed by James Cruze

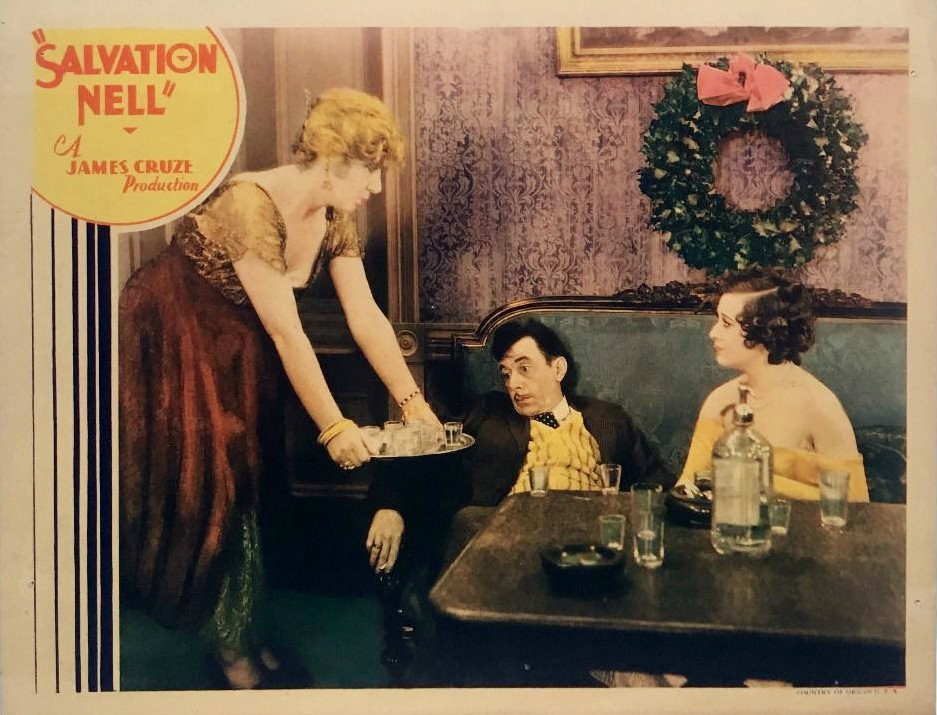
- Lobby card
- Directed by: James Cruze
- Written by: Edward Sheldon (play)
- Produced by: James Cruze; Samuel Zierler
- Starring: Ralph Graves; Helen Chandler
- Cinematography: C. Edgar Schoenbaum
- Edited by: Rose Loewinger
- Distributed by: Tiffany Pictures
- Release date: July 1, 1931
- Running time: 8 reels (7,652.8 feet)
- Country: United States
- Language: English

Salvation Nell is a 1931 American pre-Code drama film produced and directed by James Cruze and distributed by Tiffany Films, a company then on the brink of ceasing operations. The film is based on Edward Sheldon's 1908 Broadway play which starred Minnie Maddern Fiske and Holbrook Blinn.

Two silent versions were produced: in 1915 with Beatriz Michelena and in 1921 with Pauline Starke. Ralph Graves and Helen Chandler star in this film. Actor Matthew Betz appeared in both this film and the 1921 silent film. After years of being thought a lost film, a print was shown at a film festival in 2001.

== Plot ==
Young Nell (Chandler) loses her job and home and her father is sent to prison. She joins the Salvation Army and tries to redeem him when he comes out of prison, bent on continuing his life of crime.

== Cast ==
- Ralph Graves as Jim Platt
- Helen Chandler as Nell Saunders
- Sally O'Neil as Myrtle
- Jason Robards as Major Williams
- DeWitt Jennings as McGovern
- Charlotte Walker as Maggie
- Matthew Betz as Mooney
- Rose Dione as Madame Cloquette
- Wally Albright as Jimmy
