= Just Squaw =

1919 film

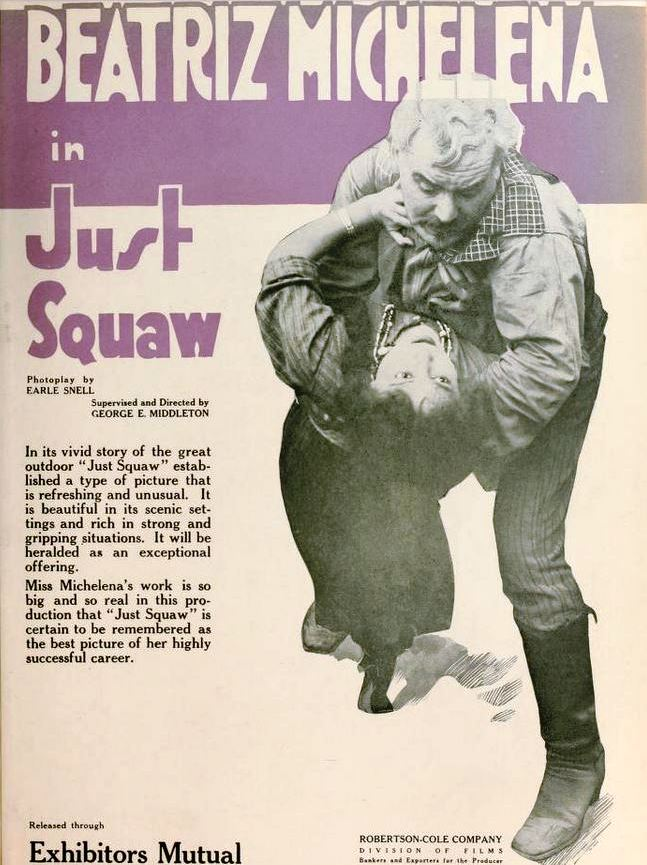
- Directed by: George E. Middleton
- Written by: Earle Snell
- Produced by: Beatriz Michelena; George E. Middleton
- Starring: Beatriz Michelena; Andrew Robson
- Production company: Beatriz Michelena Features
- Distributed by: Robertson-Cole Distributing Corporation
- Release date: May 11, 1919
- Running time: 50 minutes
- Country: United States
- Languages: Silent; English intertitles

Just Squaw is a 1919 American silent western drama film directed by George E. Middleton and starring Beatriz Michelena and Andrew Robson.

== Cast ==
- Beatriz Michelena as Fawn
- William Pike as The Stranger
- Andrew Robson as Snake Le Gal
- Albert Morrison as The Half-Breed
- D. Mitsoras as Romney

== Censorship ==
Initially, Just Squaw was rejected in its entirety by the Kansas Board of Review, but was reviewed again a month later where it passed with cuts. The intertitles removed said "She's just squaw and fair game" and "Your city dude won't have all the sweets," and the scenes removed were a fight between Snake Le Gal and The Half-Breed and the struggle between Fawn and Snake.

== Bibliography ==
- Connelly, Robert B. The Silents: Silent Feature Films, 1910-36, Volume 40, Issue 2. December Press, 1998.
- Fregoso, Rosa Linda. Mexicana Encounters: The Making of Social Identities on the Borderlands. University of California Press, 2003.
