= Hickville to Broadway =

1921 film

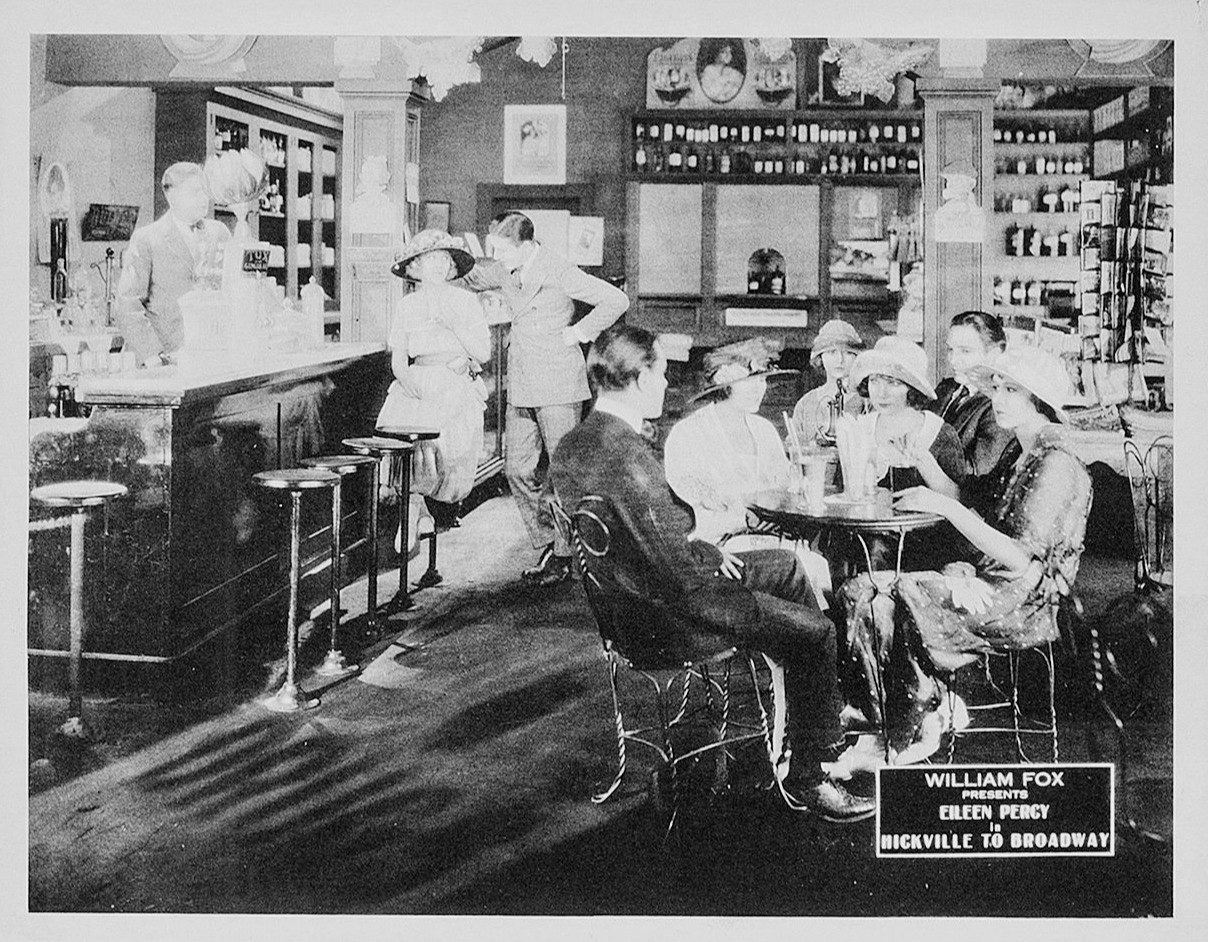
- Directed by: Carl Harbaugh
- Written by: Carl Harbaugh; Ralph Spence
- Produced by: William Fox
- Starring: Eileen Percy; William Scott; Rosemary Theby
- Cinematography: Otto Brautigan
- Edited by: Ralph Spence
- Production company: Fox Film
- Distributed by: Fox Film
- Release date: August 28, 1921
- Running time: 50 minutes
- Country: United States
- Languages: Silent; English intertitles

Hickville to Broadway is a lost 1921 American silent comedy film directed by Carl Harbaugh and starring Eileen Percy, William Scott and Rosemary Theby.

== Cast ==
- Eileen Percy as Anna Mae Neil
- William Scott as Virgil Cole
- Rosemary Theby as Sibyle Fane
- J.P. Lockney as Elder Neil
- Margaret Morris as Violet Garden
- Ray Howard as Pinky Hale
- Paul Kamp as Helper
- Edmund Burns as Peter Van Reuter

== Bibliography ==
- Munden, Kenneth White. The American Film Institute Catalog of Motion Pictures Produced in the United States, Part 1. University of California Press, 1997.
