= Who's Your Servant? =

1920 film

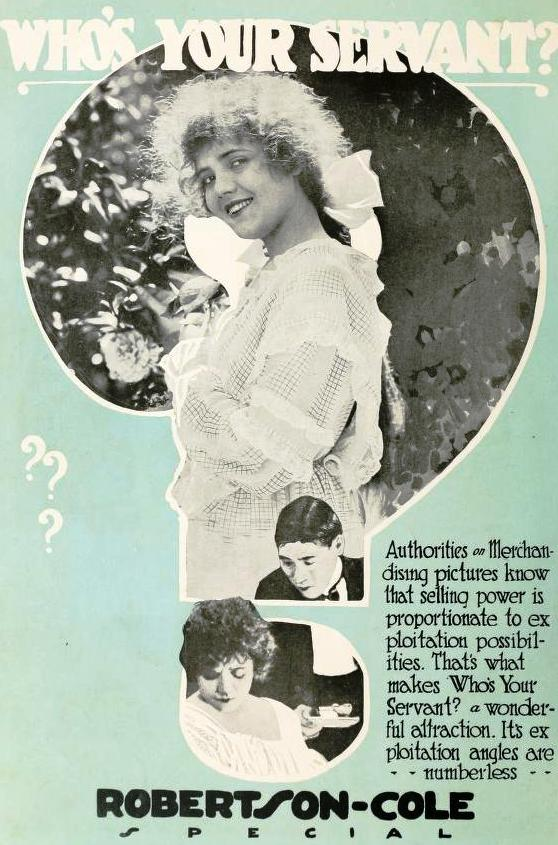
- Contemporary advertisement
- Directed by: not credited
- Written by: Julian Johnson
- Produced by: Clarence Payne
- Starring: Lois Wilson
- Production company: California Motion Picture Corporation
- Distributed by: Robertson-Cole
- Release date: February 22, 1920
- Running time: 5 reels; 4,950 feet
- Country: United States
- Language: Silent (English intertitles)

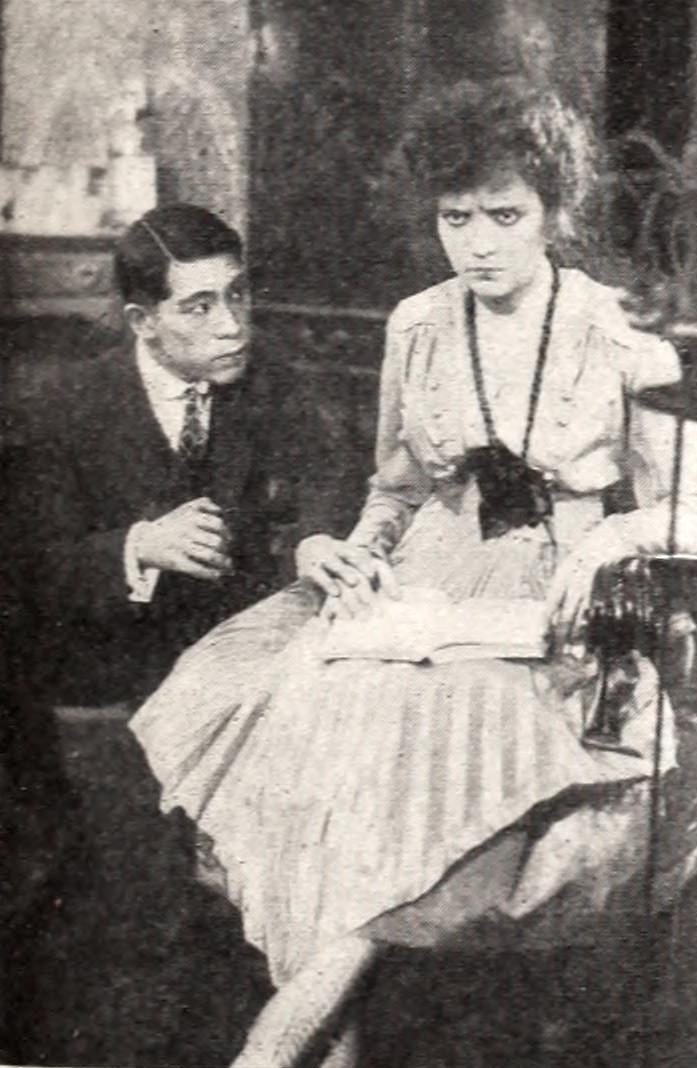
Still with Yukio Aoyama and Lois Wilson.

Who's Your Servant? is a lost 1920 American silent drama film made by an independent studio and distributed by second tier producer Robertson-Cole Pictures. The film starred a young Lois Wilson and its director was not credited. It is based on a 1913 Broadway play Hari Kari by Julian Johnson who also wrote the scenario for this film.

Who's Your Servant? was filmed in and around San Rafael, California.

== Plot ==
As described in a film magazine, Lieutenant Clifford Bruce (Scott) of the U.S. Navy, in love with Madeline Bancroft (Wilson), daughter of his commanding officer, is accused of the theft of plans for a new gun turret that "render obsolete the navies of the world." Madeline, who has been annoyed by the attentions of Ito, a Japanese servant in the house, comes to believe that he is guilty of the theft. Knowing that there is a Japanese battleship visiting the harbor that could facilitate his escape, she goes to his room at night to learn the truth of the matter by seeming to yield to his advances. She is successful in recovering the plans, but Ito is killed during her escape. She returns the plans to her father Admiral Bancroft (Robson), making it appear that they had only been mislaid. Lt. Bruce is released, allowing him and Madeline to marry.

== Cast ==
- Lois Wilson as Madeline Bancroft
- Yukio Aoyama as Ito Natsume
- Andrew Robson as Admiral Bancroft (credited as Andrew Robeson)
- Albert Morrison as Captain Norman Sharp
- William Scott as Lt. Clifford Bruce
- Frances Burnham as Dorothy Taylor

== Reception ==
A review stated that Who's Your Servant? did "not constitute a good motion picture" and complained of the acting and direction, noting that the wartime plot was no longer timely.
