= Thieves (1919 film) =

1919 American silent film

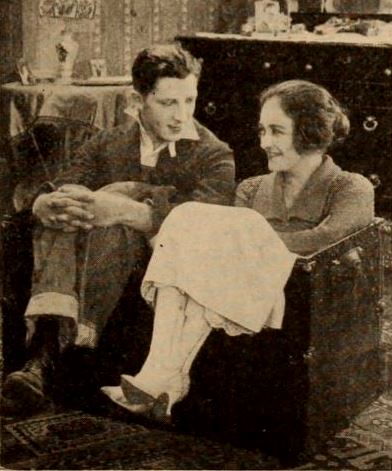
- Movie still with William Scott and Gladys Brockwell
- Directed by: Frank Beal
- Screenplay by: Douglas Bronston
- Story by: Will C. Beale
- Starring: Gladys Brockwell
- Cinematography: Friend Baker
- Production company: Fox Film Corporation
- Distributed by: Fox Film Corporation
- Release date: December 7, 1919
- Running time: 5 reels
- Country: United States
- Language: Silent

Thieves is a lost 1919 American silent drama film directed by Frank Beal. Douglas Bronston wrote the screenplay and Will C. Beale the story. The cast includes Gladys Brockwell, William Scott, Hayward Mack, Jean Calhoun, W. C. Robinson, Bobby Starr, John Cossar, Yukio Aoyama, and Marie James. The plot involves a crook gone straight and a love story.

== Cast ==
- Gladys Brockwell as Mazie Starrett
- William Scott as Jimmy Britton
- Hayward Mack as Henry Hartland
- Jean Calhoun as Allison Cabot
- W. C. Robinson as Spike Robinson
- Bobby Starr as The Rat
- John Cossar as Inspector
- Yukio Aoyama as Valet
- Marie James as Maid

== Preservation ==
With no holdings located in archives, Thieves is considered a lost film.
