= The Nightingale (1914 film) =

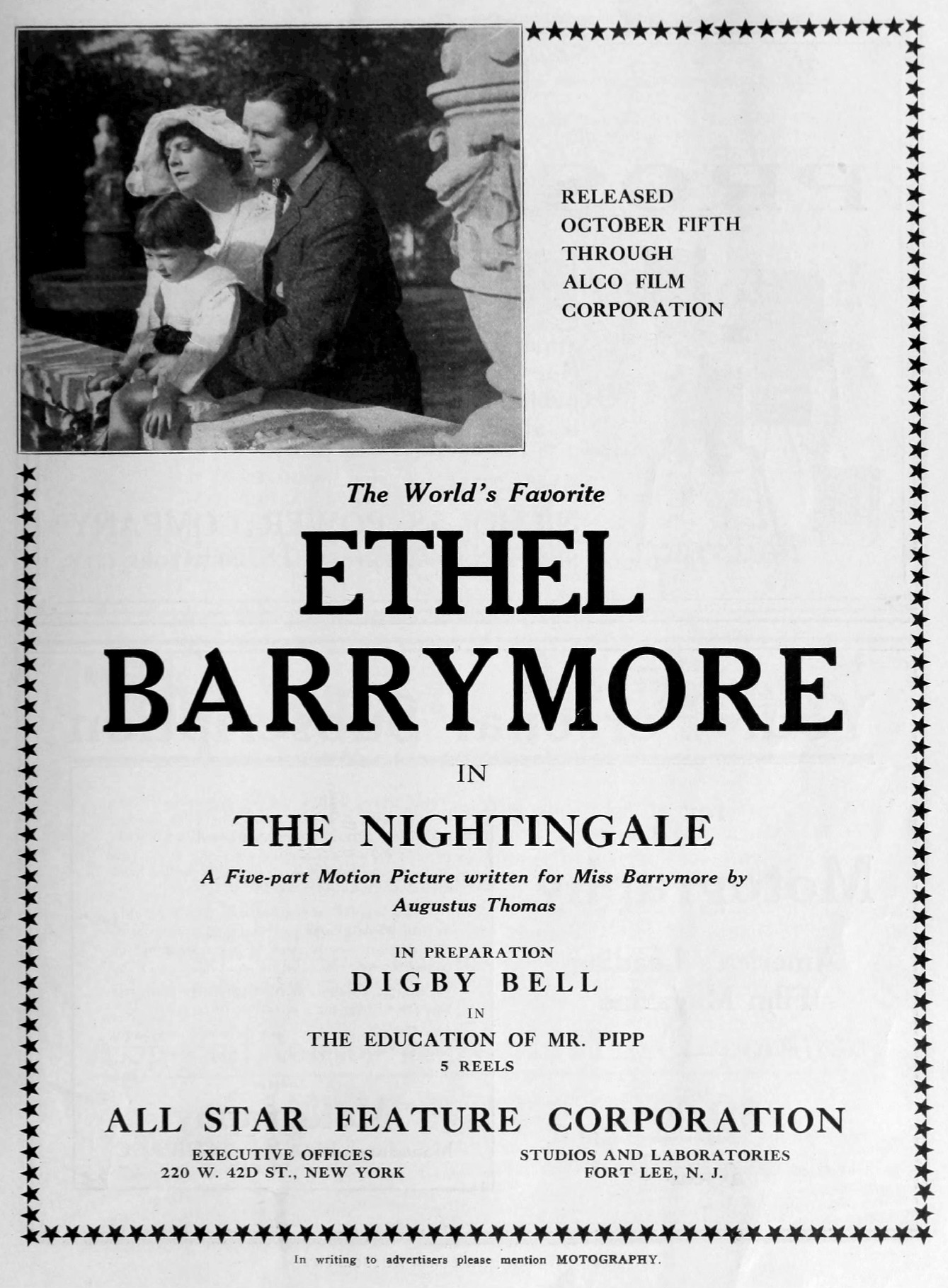
- Ad for film
- Directed by: Augustus E. Thomas
- Written by: Augustus Thomas
- Starring: Ethel Barrymore
- Production company: All Star Feature Film Corporation
- Distributed by: Alco Film Corporation
- Release date: October 5, 1914
- Running time: 5 reels
- Country: United States
- Language: Silent (English intertitles)

The Nightingale, a 1914 American silent drama film directed and written by Augustus Thomas, which Alco Film Corporation released. Ethel Barrymore makes her acting debut in this feature film, which Thomas wrote specifically for her. Thomas, famed as a Broadway playwright, was the best friend of Barrymore's father Maurice, and had known the actress since she was a child. As with many of Barrymore's films to come, the advertising for this film says the film is told in 'acts' as with a stage play, an effort to remind the audience of the star's status and preference for the legitimate stage. This film was long thought to be lost.

== Cast ==
- Ethel Barrymore as Isola Franti, 'The Nightingale'
- William Courtleigh as Tony Franti
- Frank Andrews as Andrea Franti
- Conway Tearle as Charles Marden
- Charles A. Stevenson as Nathan Narden
- Irving Brooks as 'Red' Galvin
- Mario Majeroni as David Mantz
- Philip Hahn as Jean de Resni
- Ida Darling as Mrs. Belmore
- Bobby Stewart as Nathan Marden II
- Henri Antiznat as Prefect of Police
- Frank Dudley as Frank
- M. Monet as Gazzi Catassi
- Caroline French as Maid
- Mrs. Cooper Cliffe as Nola
- Claude Cooper as Madonni
- Ed West as Police Sergeant

== Production ==
The story of this film is similar to Clyde Fitch's 1901 play Captain Jinks of the Horse Marines, in which Barrymore became a star playing an Italian opera singer. Fitch had died in 1909, and Charles Frohman, Barrymore's theatrical employer, owned the rights to Captain Jinks. Augustus Thomas, a Barrymore family friend and author, fashioned a similar story for Barrymore, enticing her to make a film with material she was familiar with. This was common practice in the silent era to make a write-around story for popular works for which screen rights could not be obtained.

A screen version of Fitch's Captain Jinks was later made with Ann Murdock.
