= An Enemy of Men =

1925 film directed by Frank R. Strayer

- Directed by: Frank R. Strayer
- Written by: Douglas Bronston
- Starring: Dorothy Revier; Cullen Landis; Caesare Gravina
- Cinematography: Frank B. Good
- Production company: Waldorf Productions
- Distributed by: Columbia Pictures
- Release date: July 1, 1925 (US)
- Running time: 6 reels
- Country: United States
- Language: Silent (English intertitles)

An Enemy of Men is a 1925 American silent melodrama film directed by Frank R. Strayer from an original script by Douglas Bronston. It stars Dorothy Revier, Cullen Landis, and Caesare Gravina, and was released by Columbia Pictures on July 1, 1925.

== Plot ==
As described in a film magazine review, because of her sister's betrayal and subsequent death, Norma Bennett takes a vow to make all men pay. She becomes a night club favorite and is courted by John Hurd, who is the man who ruined her sister. Dr. Phil Ordway is in love with her, but she refuses his offer of marriage. When she discovers the identity of John as her sister's betrayer, she takes a gun and goes to the cabaret to shoot him, but he dies by another's hand. She then agrees and weds Dr. Ordway.

== Cast list ==
- Dorothy Revier as Norma Bennett
- Cullen Landis as Dr. Phil Ordway
- Caesare Gravina as Tony Caruso
- Charles Clary as John Hurd
- Leo White as Roberti
- Barbara Luddy as Janet
- Virginia Marshall as Baby Janet
- Margaret Landis as Miss Ordway

== Production ==
While the American Film Institute's database gives an opening date of July 1, 1925, Motion Picture News gives the world premiere date of July 20, at the Strand Theatre in Providence, Rhode Island.

== Reception ==
The Bridgeport Telegram gave the film a lukewarm review, calling Revier and Landis' work "capable", with the rest of the performers being an "able cast". The Shreveport Times called the script "a powerful drama of woman's bitter life". The Chicago Tribune gave the picture a lukewarm review, stating that "there's nothing new or original about the story, which is, if you get down to brass tacks, far from convincing." However, they felt the acting was good, while the direction and photography were good as well.

== Preservation and status ==
A copy of the film is held at EYE Film Institute Netherlands.

== Bibliography ==
- Munden, Kenneth White. The American Film Institute Catalog of Motion Pictures Produced in the United States, Part 1. University of California Press, 1997.
