= Charles Witherle Hooke =

American writer

Charles Witherle Hooke (December 23, 1861 – May 17, 1929) was an American writer. His humorous stories were collected and published. At least one of his writings was adapted into a film. He used the pseudonym Howard Fielding.

He was born in Castine, Maine.

He graduated from Harvard University with a degree in literature.

== Writings ==
- Automatic Bridget, and other humorous stories
- A New York Alderman: Experience of a City Father in 1898
- The mind cure, and other humorous sketches Manhattan Therapeutic Co. New York c1888
- Col. Evans from Kentucky, and other humorous sketches Manhattan Therapeutic Co. New York 1889
- The Victim of His Clothes co-written with Frederick Russell Burton, J. S. Ogilvie New York 1890
- Straight Crooks: A Detective Story (1927)

== Filmography ==
- The Inspirations of Harry Larrabbee (1917) based on his story written as Howard Fielding
- Mentioned in Confidence (1917), based on his story written as Howard Fielding
