= The Bravest Way =

1918 film by George Melford

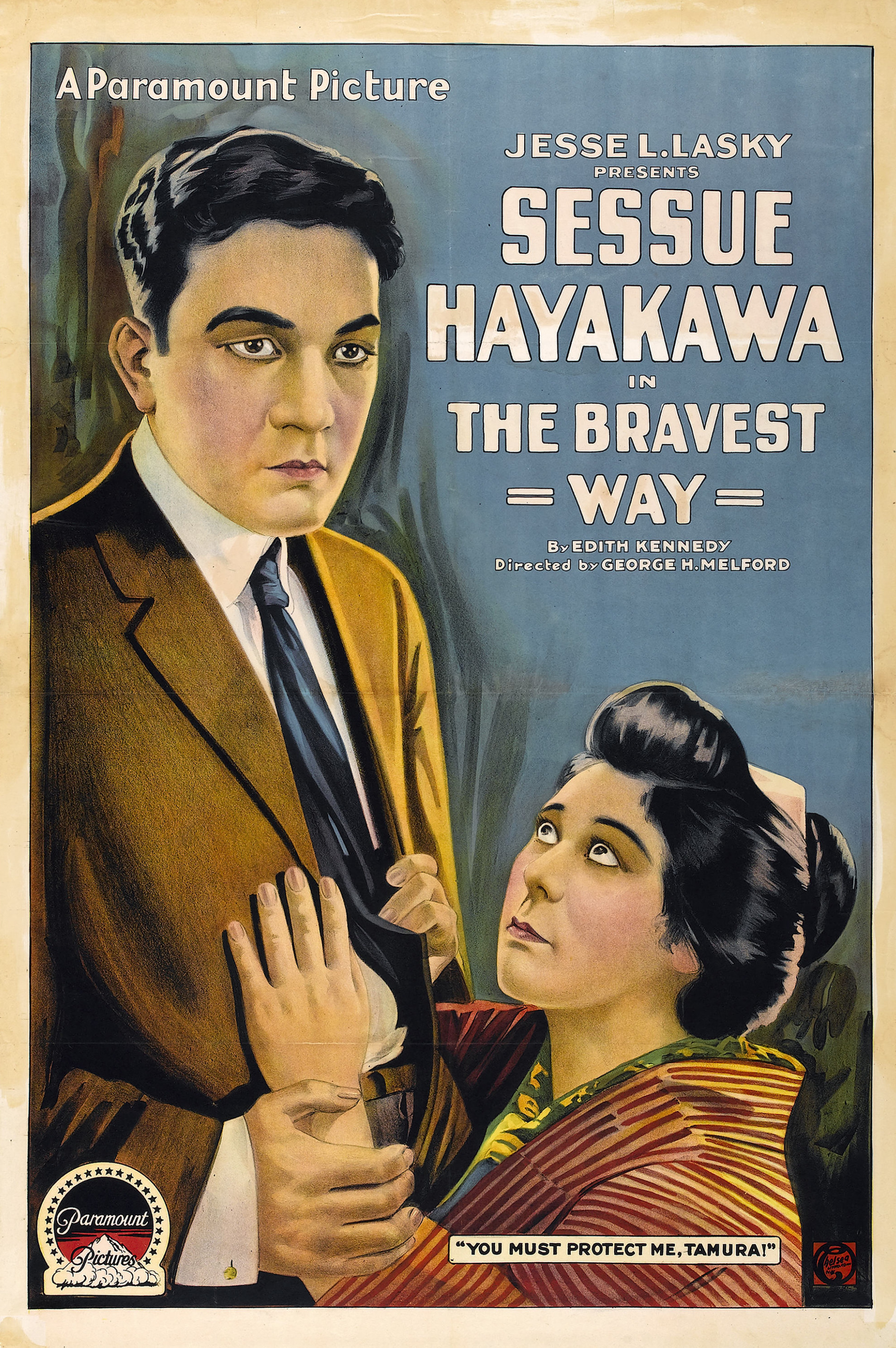
- Theatrical release poster
- Directed by: George Melford
- Screenplay by: Edith Kennedy
- Produced by: Jesse L. Lasky
- Starring: Sessue Hayakawa; Florence Vidor; Tsuru Aoki; Yukio Aoyama; Jane Wolfe; Winter Hall
- Cinematography: Paul P. Perry
- Production company: Famous Players–Lasky Corporation
- Distributed by: Paramount Pictures
- Release date: June 16, 1918
- Running time: 50 minutes
- Country: United States
- Language: Silent (English intertitles)

The Bravest Way is a 1918 American silent drama film directed by George Melford and written by Edith M. Kennedy. The film stars Sessue Hayakawa, Florence Vidor, Tsuru Aoki, Yukio Aoyama, Jane Wolfe, and Winter Hall. The film was released on June 16, 1918, by Paramount Pictures.

== Plot ==
As described in a film magazine, Kara Tamura, a humble worker studying landscape gardening, and Shiro Watana, a trusted clerk, live together in San Francisco. Watana sends for his wife Sat-u and children from Japan, and Tamura dreams of the day when he will have enough money to marry Nume Rogers, a teacher at a nearby kindergarten. Watana is mysteriously murdered. Sat-u arrives and Tamura takes her into his home. Meddlesome neighbors compel Tamura to marry Sat-u, and Nume, heartbroken, accepts the offer of a wealthy man to cultivate her voice as an opera singer. Three years pass and Sat-u is fatally ill. Before she dies, she explains to Nume Tamura's reason for marrying her. Watana's uncle places his property in Tamura's hands for his sacrifice, and Nume and Tamura are reunited.

== Cast ==
- Sessue Hayakawa as Kara Tamura
- Florence Vidor as Nume Rogers
- Tsuru Aoki as Sat-u
- Yukio Aoyama as Shiro Watana
- Jane Wolfe as Miss Tompkins
- Winter Hall as Moreby Nason
- Kisaburo Kurihara as Sam Orson
- Josephine Crowell as Janitress
- Goro Kino as Motoyoshi
- Clarence Geldart as The Minister
- Guy Oliver as The Lawyer
- William Elmer

== Preservation ==
With no prints of The Bravest Way located in any film archives, it is considered a lost film.
