= When the Wife's Away =

1926 film directed by Frank R. Strayer

- Directed by: Frank R. Strayer
- Written by: Douglas Bronston
- Produced by: Harry Cohn
- Starring: George K. Arthur; Dorothy Revier
- Production company: Columbia Pictures
- Distributed by: Columbia Pictures
- Release date: October 26, 1926 (US)
- Running time: 6 reels
- Country: United States
- Language: Silent (English intertitles)

When the Wife's Away is a 1926 American silent domestic comedy film directed by Frank R. Strayer and starring George K. Arthur and Dorothy Revier. Written by Douglas Bronston, it was released by Columbia Pictures on October 26, 1926.

== Cast list ==
- George K. Arthur as Billy Winthrop
- Dorothy Revier as Ethel Winthrop
- Bobby Dunn as Uncle Hiram
- Ned Sparks
- Harry Depp
- Lincoln Plummer
- Tom Ricketts
- Ina Rorke

== Preservation and status ==
A complete copy of the film is held at the George Eastman House.
