= Double Cross Roads =

1930 film

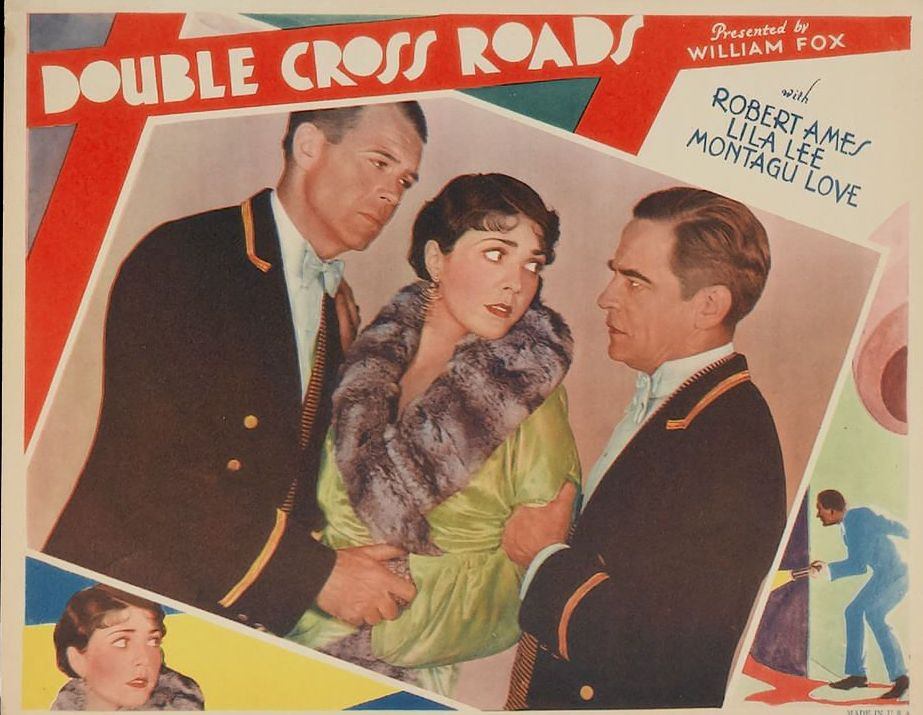
- Directed by: Alfred L. Werker; George E. Middleton
- Written by: George S. Brooks; Howard Estabrook; William R. Lipman (novel)
- Starring: Robert Ames; Lila Lee; Edythe Chapman
- Cinematography: Joseph H. August; Sol Halperin
- Edited by: Jack Dennis
- Music by: George Lipschultz
- Production company: Fox Film Corporation
- Distributed by: Fox Film Corporation
- Release date: April 20, 1930
- Running time: 64 minutes
- Country: United States
- Language: English

Double Cross Roads is a 1930 pre-Code American crime drama film directed by George E. Middleton and Alfred L. Werker and starring Robert Ames, Lila Lee and Edythe Chapman. It was produced and distributed by Fox Film, recorded on the Movietone sound system.

== Plot ==
Ex-convict David Harvey attempts to go straight and settles in a small town where he meets and falls in love with Mary Carlyle. His former gang tries to persuade him to take part in a robbery of a wealthy woman but he refuses until discovering that Mary is in league with the gang.

== Cast ==
- Robert Ames as David Harvey
- Lila Lee as Mary Carlyle
- Edythe Chapman as Mrs. Carlyle
- Montagu Love as Gene Dyke
- Ned Sparks as Happy Max
- Thomas E. Jackson as Deuce Wilson
- Charlotte Walker as Mrs. Tilton
- George MacFarlane as Warden
- William V. Mong as Caleb
- Thomas Jefferson as Caretaker
- Roscoe Ates as Ticket Agent
- Yola d'Avril as Happy Max's Moll
- Bill Elliott as Party Guest
- J. Carrol Naish as Dyke's Lookout / Driver
- Charles Sullivan as Barman
- Harry Tenbrook as Wilson's Driver

== Bibliography ==
- Goble, Alan. The Complete Index to Literary Sources in Film. Walter de Gruyter, 1999.
