= J. S. Ogilvie =

Scottish-American publisher (1843–1910)

- Born: John Stuart Ogilvie; 1843; Scotland
- Died: February 9, 1910 (aged 66–67); Brooklyn, New York, US
- Occupation: Publisher

John Stuart Ogilvie (1843–1910) was a publisher in the United States.

== Biography ==
He was born in Scotland and immigrated to the U.S. with his family at age four. Ogilvie published John Cowan's Science of a New Life. Ogilvie published dime novels and how-to books. The American Bookseller ran an image of Ogilvie. His book Seven Hundred Album Verses had a significant influence.

Ogilvie published an illustrated program for New York City's commemoration ceremonies for the centennial of George Washington's first inauguration held in New York City in 1789.

He died at his home in Brooklyn on February 9, 1910.

== Bibliography ==
- The Album Writer's Friend: Comprising More Than Three Hundred Choice Selections of Poetry and Prose, Suitable for Writing in Autograph Albums, Valentines, Birthday, Christmas and New Year Cards (1881)
- Ogilvie's Handy Book of Useful Information and Statistical Tables of Practical Value: A Universal Handbook for Ready Reference (1884)
- Seven Hundred Album Verses; Choice selections of poetry and prose
- Life and Death of Jay Gould, and how he made his millions
- One Hundred Prize Dinners (1889)
- How to Woo: When and Whom (1889)
- Illustrated Programme of the Centennial Celebration in New York, April, 1889
- The Victim of His Clothes by Charles Wotherle Hooke and Frederick Russell Burton, J. S. Ogilvie New York 1890
- The Press Prize Recipes for Meats, Vegetables, Bread and Pastry
- The Album Writer's Friend
- History of the Attempted Assassination of James A. Garfield
- The Life and Death of James A. Garfield; From the tow path to the White House
- History of the General Slocum
- The "Man in the Street" stories from the New York Times
- Ogilvie's Book on How to Become an American Citizen
- How to Talk and Debate
- History of the Great Flood in Johnstown, Pa., May 31, 1889, by Which over Ten Thousand Lives Were Lost
- Ogilvie's House Plans (1895)
