= Hiram Abrams =

Early American movie mogul (1878–1926)

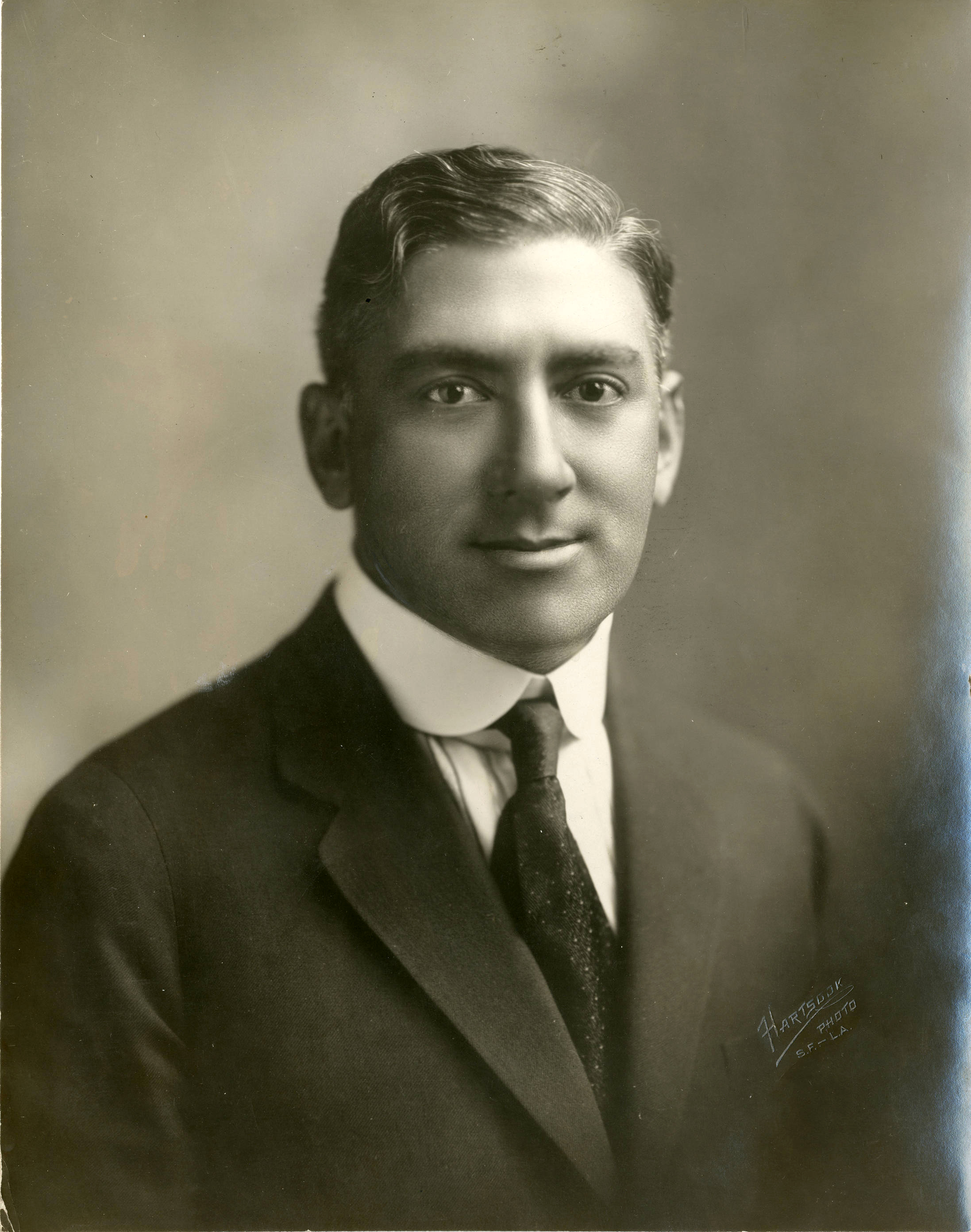
- Hiram Abrams (1917)
- Born: February 22, 1878; Portland, Maine, US
- Died: November 15, 1926 (aged 48); Manhattan, New York City, US

Hiram Abrams (February 22, 1878 – November 15, 1926) was an early American movie mogul and one of the first presidents of Paramount Pictures. He was also the first managing director of United Artists.

== Biography ==
Hiram was born in Portland, Maine, the son of a Russian Jewish immigrant who became a real estate broker. Hiram Abrams left school at the age of sixteen, sold newspapers, and eventually ended up managing several Portland film theaters. By 1909, he began marketing films, and later became a distributor.

== Paramount ==
Through the motion picture industry, Abrams became acquainted with W. W. Hodkinson and when Hodkinson founded Paramount Pictures in 1914, Abrams began serving on the five-man board-of-directors. When Hodkinson denied Paramount partners Adolph Zukor and Jesse L. Lasky more of the profits, Zukor - in a Machiavellian plot - devised a coup.

Zukor and Lasky sold Hodkinson more of their film rights and, using that money, they purchased Paramount stock to, by 1916, gain a majority of it. Then with Abrams, James Steele and William Sherry, they used this majority to vote Hodkinson out. Abrams took over as president and Steele as treasurer.

In 1917, Abrams, while in Boston, organized a party for Fatty Arbuckle, Zukor, Lasky, and several others. Eventually, the party, sans Arbuckle, moved to Mishawum Manor, an inn of notorious reputation. Willing women appeared, and later a photographer. A few days later, it became evident the moguls had been caught in a badger game. Daniel H. Coakley, a notoriously crooked Boston lawyer, threatened arrest on moral charges. Studio lawyers were hastily summoned and eventually $100,000 was paid to have the charges dropped. It is likely this escapade cost Abrams his job, as Zukor fired him soon afterwards.

== United Artists ==
Abrams and his new partner, Ben Schulberg, convinced Mary Pickford, Douglas Fairbanks, Charles Chaplin, and D. W. Griffith to break with their studios and form an independent distributing company; the result was United Artists, set up on 5 February 1919. Abrams was appointed its managing director.

During the company's early years, there were serious problems. The United Artists could not produce a continuous flow of films for theaters and suffered serious distribution problems caused by competing firms. Schulberg walked away within two months. Roughly a year later, he sued Abrams, alleging Abrams had breached their partnership agreement. These distribution problems were not solved until Joseph Schenck, Abrams' successor, took over.

During Abrams' tenure, however, United Artists did release Griffith's Way Down East (1921) and Chaplin's The Gold Rush (1925). Both were enormously successful, becoming two of the top ten grossing films of the 1920s.

Also during his UA tenure, Abrams held the distinction of teaching Buster Keaton the game of bridge in 1925 while both were aboard a long train ride. "Mr. Abrams kept telling me that I was stupid and became more abusive as the day wore on." The angry encounter even came close to turning physical. But just 18 months later, Keaton--a relentless competitor and a longtime gambler--had become adept enough at bridge to win $3800 from Abrams.

Abram's involvement in United Artists, and his life, ended in Manhattan on 15 November 1926, from a sudden cardiac incident, aged 48.
