= Scratched (1916 film) =

1916 American film

Scratched is a 1916 American short film directed by Fred Kelsey, scenario by Douglas Bronston, starring Earle Page, Irene Hunt, and Jean Hersholt.
