= Alco Films =

American short-lived film distributor

Alco Films, established as Alco Film Corporation, was a short-lived American film distributor established in New York City during the silent film era in 1914. It was co-founded by Al Lichtman. The company worked to establish exclusive distribution deals with movie theater networks for its films. It entered bankruptcy proceedings in 1915 after internal strife, but the shareholders reorganized as Metro Pictures in January 1915.

== Selected filmography ==
- The Nightingale (1914)
- Salomy Jane (1914)
- Tillie's Punctured Romance (1914)
- Shore Acres (1914)
- The Three of Us (1914)
