= Harold Entwistle =

English actor and director

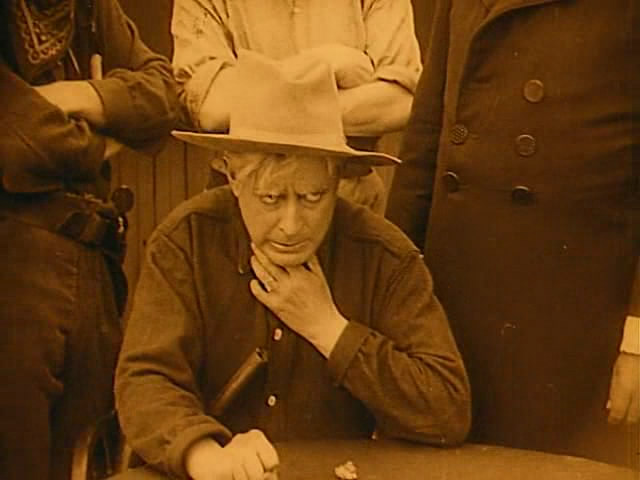
- Entwistle in Salomy Jane (1914)
- Born: Charles Harold Entwistle; 5 September 1865; Dorset, England, UK
- Died: 1 April 1944 (aged 78); Los Angeles, California, US
- Resting place: Forest Lawn Memorial Park, Glendale, California
- Occupation: Actor
- Spouse: Bertha Jane Ross

Charles Harold Entwistle (5 September 1865 – 1 April 1944) was an actor on stage and in films, a manager of theatres, touring theatre companies, and director from England who migrated to the United States and worked in Hollywood during and after the silent film era. In England, he performed for the king and queen.

== Personal life ==
He married actress Bertha Jane Ross. He was known as a character actor.

He was the uncle of Peg Entwistle who died after jumping off the H in the Hollywood Sign.

He was buried in Forest Lawn Memorial Park, Glendale, California.

== Filmography ==
=== As an actor ===
- Salomy Jane (1914)
- The Summer Girl (1916)
- The Beggar of Cawnpore (1916)
- One of Many (1917)
- Miss Robinson Crusoe (1917)
- In the Hollow of Her Hand (1918)
- The Divorcee
- The Woman Under Oath (1919)
- The Moonstone (1934)
- Paris in Spring (1935)

=== As director ===
- Mrs. Wiggs of the Cabbage Patch (1914 film)
