= Salvation Nell (1915 film) =

1915 film

- Directed by: George E. Middleton
- Based on: play Salvation Nell by Edward Sheldon
- Starring: Beatriz Michelena
- Distributed by: World Film Corporation
- Release date: October 24, 1915
- Running time: 6 reels
- Country: USA
- Language: Silent..English titles

Salvation Nell is a lost 1915 silent drama film directed by George E. Middleton and starring Beatriz Michelena. It was produced by the California Motion Picture Company and released through World Film Corporation.

The storyline involves a woman with an abusive alcoholic father and other challenging circumstances working as a maid and living in tenements. Despite the challenges she faces she remains steadfast and ultimately joins the Salvation Army.

== Cast ==
- Beatriz Michelena - Nell Saunders
- William Pike - Jim Platt
- Nina Herbert - Nell's mother
- Clarence Arper - Nell's father
- James Leslie - Sid McGovern
- Irene Outtrim - Myrtle
- Myrtle Neuman - Sal
- Frank Hollins - Old roue
- Minnette Barrett - Young Woman
- Andrew Robson - Major Williams
- Katherine Angus - Halleluja Maggie
- D. Mitsoras - Proprietor of Saloon
- Earl Emlay - Tough

== Preservation ==
With no holdings located in archives, Salvation Nell is considered a lost film.
