= Yukio Aoyama =

Japanese actor

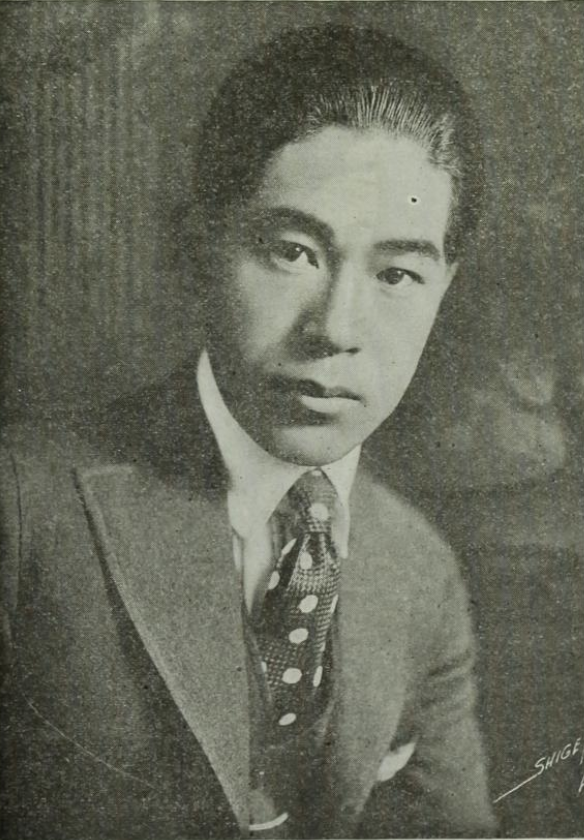
Yukio Aoyama, from a 1919 publication

Masajiro Kaihatsu, known professionally as Yukio Aoyama, was an actor and assistant director in the United States during the silent film era. He appeared in about 60 silent films and serials after immigrating from Tokyo to appear in films. His son Arthur Aoyama (Arthur Kaihatsu) was a child actor. Aoyama was one of several Japanese actors in Hollywood and he was involved with a theater production of the Japanese tragedy, Matsuo.

== Filmography ==
- Pidgin Island (1916)
- The Bravest Way (1918)
- A Japanese Nightingale (1918)
- Thieves (1919)
- Who's Your Servant? (1920)
- The Tiger Band (1920), a serial
