= George E. Middleton =

American film producer

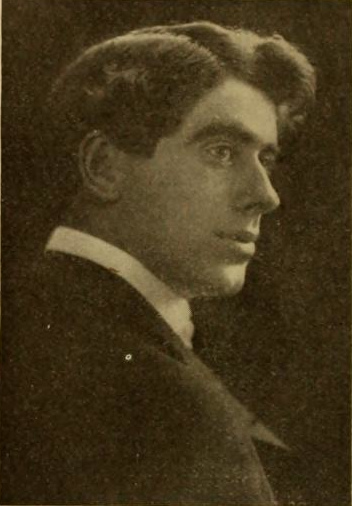
George E. Middleton

George Emile Middleton (1882–1969) was an American film director and producer. His work includes films for California Motion Picture Corporation (CMPC) and, after its failure, Beatriz Michelena Features. Middleton married stage actress and singer Beatriz Michelena, who starred in his films.

Middleton's family was prominent in the San Francisco Bay Area and was involved in the Ocean Shore Railroad and Middleton Motor Car Co. His father was a timber baron.

Middleton graduated from Lowell High School and joined the car business. He did advertising and promotion for the auto business including short films. He also made film promotions under contract for other businesses. He became an executive producer and director at CMPC, which he named. He also created the film company's logo with a bear on it.

Motography ran a feature on him in 1916. A similar profile ran in Moving Picture World and also noted Middleton's work on a film production of the play Kismet with film star Otis Skinner. Skinner appeared in Kismet with Louis J. Gasnier directing in a Waldorf Film Corporation production.

Fire destroyed many CMPC films but Salomy Jane is extant. A copy is held by the Library of Congress. Middleton was later president of the Ocean Shore Railroad Company. He died in San Rafael, California, on August 25, 1969.

== Filmography ==
- Mrs. Wiggs of the Cabbage Patch (1914) (producer)
- Salomy Jane (1914)
- The Lily of Poverty Flat (1915)
- Salvation Nell (1915)
- A Phyllis of the Sierras (1915)
- Mignon (1915) (producer)
- The Rose of the Misty Pool (1915)
- Minty's Triumph (1915)
- The Woman Who Dared (1916)
- The Unwritten Law (1916)
- Heart of Juanita (1919)
- Just Squaw (1919)
- The Flame of Hellgate (1920)
- Crazy That Way (1930) (producer)
- Double Cross Roads (1930) co-directed with Alfred L. Werker
