= Salomy Jane (1914 film) =

1914 film

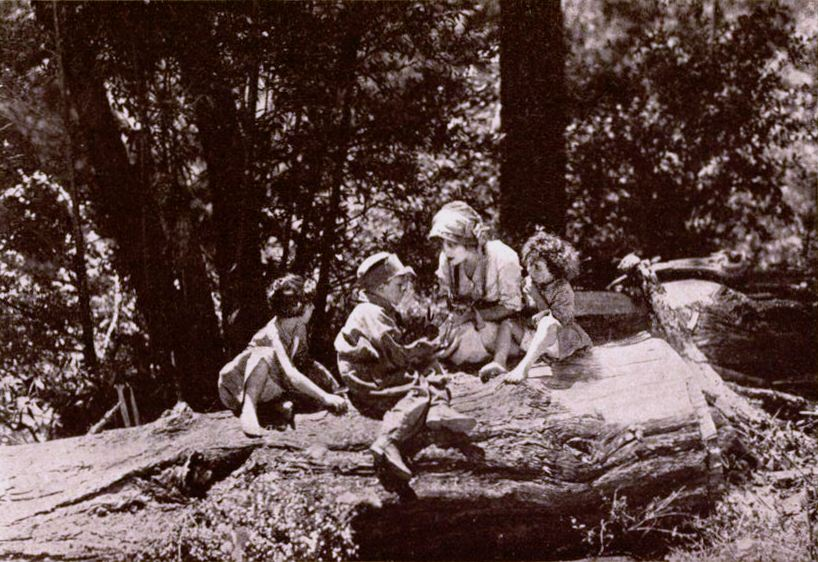
- "Tell us just one fairy tale, S'lomy"
- Directed by: William Nigh; Lucius Henderson
- Written by: Paul Armstrong (play and screenplay); Bret Harte (novella)
- Produced by: Alexander E. Beyfuss
- Starring: Beatriz Michelena; House Peters
- Cinematography: Arthur A. Cadwell; Arthur Powelson
- Distributed by: Alco Film Corporation
- Release date: November 2, 1914
- Running time: 87 minutes (seven reels)
- Country: United States
- Languages: Silent; English intertitles

Salomy Jane is a 1914 silent Western drama film based on Bret Harte's 1898 novella "Salomy Jane's Kiss" and Paul Armstrong's 1907 play based on Harte's story, Salomy Jane.

Salomy Jane was California Motion Picture Corporation's (CMPC) debut feature, as well as the screen debut of stage actress and singer Beatriz Michelena. George E. Middleton saw in his Latina wife a competitor to Mary Pickford as a premier screen star, and each CMPC production was intended to be a Michelena vehicle. Despite being well received by the public, it did not return a profit for the national distributor, Alco Films. It is the only known surviving complete work of silent film era actress Beatriz Michelena and the CMPC.

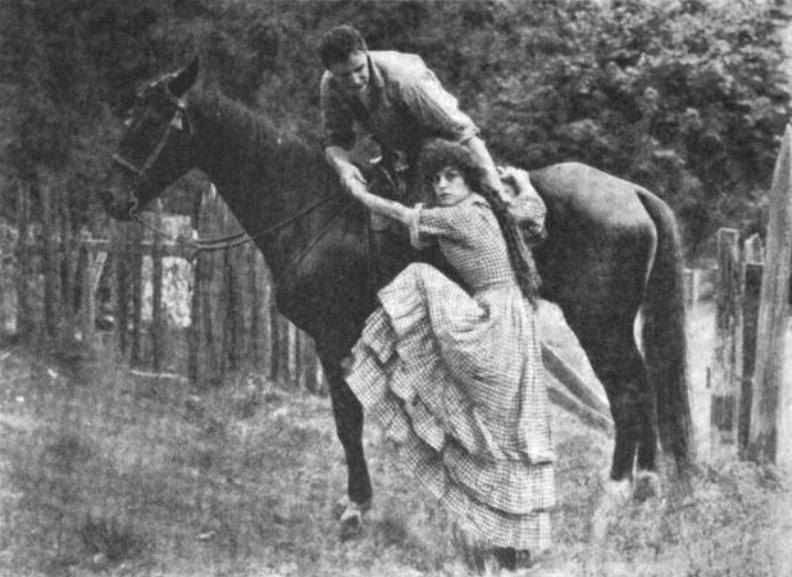
House Peters lifts Beatriz Michelena onto his horse

== Plot ==
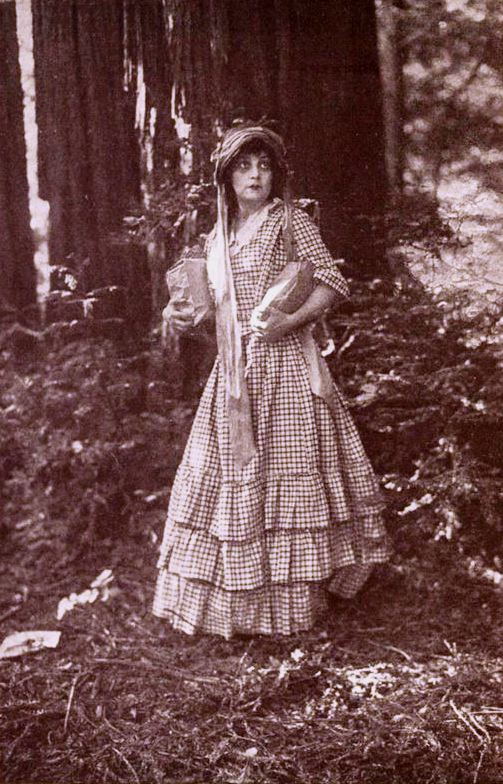

In rough-and-tumble Gold Rush-era California, Salomy Jane is saved from the ruffian Baldwin by a heroic stranger (the Man, aka Jack Dart), and he is saved from a lynching after being falsely accused of a crime.

== Cast ==
- Beatriz Michelena as Salomy Jane
- House Peters as The Man
- William Pike as "Red Pete" Heath
- Clara Beyers as Mrs Heath (as Clara Byers)
- Lorraine Levy as Anna May
- Loretta Ephran as Mary Ann
- Walter Williams as Willie Smith
- Demetrios Mitsoras as Gallagher
- Andrew Robson as Yuba Bill
- Matt B. Snyder as Madison Clay
- Harold B. Meade as Baldwin
- Clarence Arper as Colonel Starbottle
- Harold Entwistle as Larabee
- Fred Snook as Seth Low
- Ernest Joy as Marbury
- William Nigh as Rufe Waters
- Jack Holt as Cowboy in saloon playing solitaire, stuntman (uncredited). Salomy Jane includes a scene in which Holt rides a horse to the edge of a steep embankment. then jumps off tumbling more than a hundred feet down into the Russian River. The stunt netted him a bit part as a saloon patron. This role was long cited as his debut appearance in film, but he had been playing bit parts the preceding year.

== Reception ==
Salomy Jane was first shown at an invitation-only, gala event on October 8, 1914, at the St. Francis Hotel in San Francisco. The film made its public debut a few weeks alter on October 25, when it played a seven-day engagement at San Francisco's Portola theater.

The Chicago Tribune gave the film a mixed review:

It is a picture of fire and beauty, full of Bret Harte's spirit of adventure and glorious with the wondrous country which he loved. ... in places it seems a bit hard emotionally; a bit crude, bordering on slapstick, in action. In places, the action is confused, due to its rapidity and the number of players concerned, but on the whole it is a pleasant thing to witness, in addition to its scenic wonders ...

Variety magazine's opinion was more favorable:

Here is a Western drama at its best. ... The scenario is a model of clarity, despite its emphasis on swift and frequent incident. ... It is all action, action and again action, with a thrill for every second flicker ... Beatriz Michelena and House Peters ... give their work every touch to strengthen the illusion of reality ...

== Rediscovery and restoration ==
All California Motion Picture Corporation and Beatrice Michelena Studio films were believed to have been lost due to a 1931 studio fire in San Rafael, California, caused by a child's firecracker prank that destroyed the vault in which the films were stored. However, a print was found in Australia in 1996, and has been preserved by the Library of Congress. New 35mm prints began limited circulation in 2008. The restoration was part of a DVD released (2011) by the National Film Preservation Foundation in the anthology Treasures 5: The West 1898–1938.

== Remakes ==
The film was remade as Salomy Jane (1923) starring Jacqueline Logan by Famous Players–Lasky and released by Paramount Pictures, and remade again as the sound film Wild Girl (1932) by Fox Film Corporation.

== See also ==
- List of rediscovered films
