= Beatriz Michelena =

American actress (1890–1942)

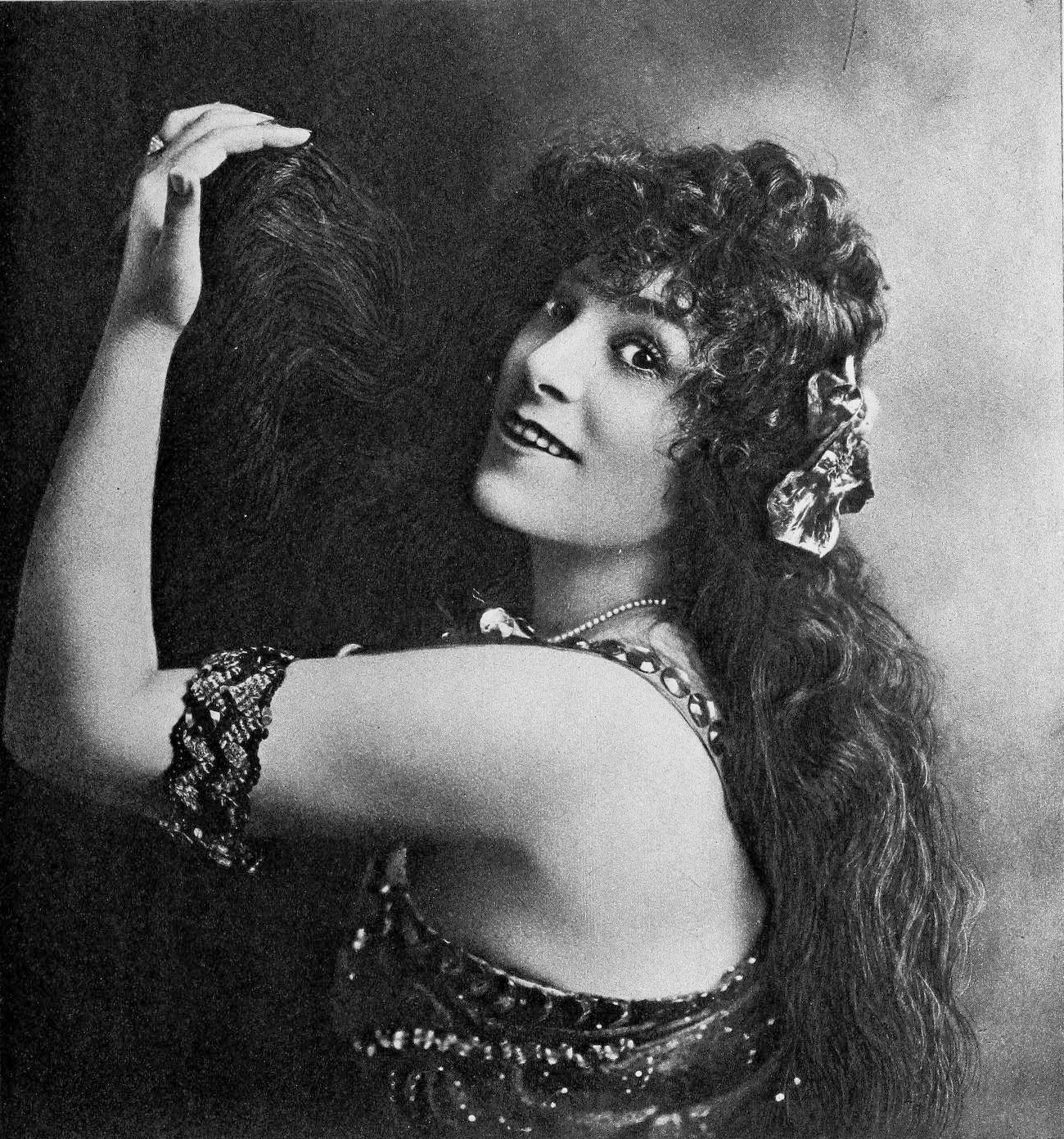
- Michelena c. 1919
- Born: February 22, 1890; New York City, U.S.
- Died: October 10, 1942 (aged 52); San Francisco, California, U.S.
- Other names: Beatriz Bronte; Beatriz Michelena Middleton
- Occupations: Actress; singer
- Years active: 1904–1927
- Spouse: George E. Middleton (m. 1907, divorced)
- Relatives: Vera Michelena (sister); Donna Barrell (half-sister)

Beatriz Michelena (February 22, 1890 – October 10, 1942), also known as Beatriz Bronte, was an American actress and singer during the silent film era, known at the time for her operatic soprano voice and appearances in musical theatre. She was one of the few Latina stars visible on the silver screen in the United States in the 1910s. She was a leading lady in each film project she was involved in and, after the failure of California Motion Picture Company, co-founded a production company with her husband George E. Middleton, producing four of her movies.

She wrote popular articles for newspapers, including an advice column for girls, describing what it was like to be an actress, and answering questions from readers. For adult readers, Michelena wrote other pieces such as a history of the moving picture industry. In 1920 when she stopped making films, she returned to her career as a singer.

Michelena faded from historiography for many years, but her place in history has recently been re-examined; she was mentioned in 2002 in a presidential proclamation and her 1914 film Salomy Jane enjoyed a limited re-release in 2008.

== Early life ==
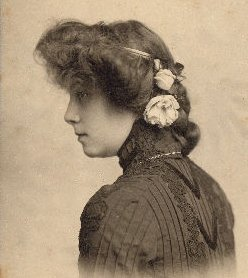
Michelena with the Princess Chic Opera Co., c. 1901

Beatriz Michelena was born in New York City. Her birth year is commonly given as 1890, as her 1942 obituaries give her age at death as 52, yet her age was given as 19 in 1904. Her father was a noted tenor Fernando Michelena, whose Spanish parents had settled in Caracas, Venezuela, where he was born. Her mother, Frances Lenord, was an operatic soprano and pianist. Her sister Vera Michelena was also an actress.

Over much of her childhood, Michelena's parents toured with the Emma Abbott Grand Opera Company a traveling theatre company that performed famous operas translated into English for American audiences. Beatriz's father in later life taught music and worked as a vocal coach and, at the time of his death, was serving as president of Arrillaga Musical College, San Francisco. Beatriz and her sisters Vera and Teresa Luisa were trained by their father in classical voice and drama studies, and they followed in his footsteps by beginning singing careers of their own.

Vera first appeared onstage in the Princess Chic Opera company (1901) at 17, taking a leading role in The Man from China (1904). Beatriz, too, performed with Princess Chic in 1901, taking chorus roles suitable for a child of 11. By mid-1904, with Vera busy pursuing her career in New York, Fernando Michelena settled in San Francisco, California to teach voice. There, he raised Beatriz and continued to train her, a soprano, in operatic vocal techniques. He passed his stage experience to his daughter: the way to move as another person, the way to make simple but authoritative gestures, and the way to build intensity over the span of a performance.

== Marriage and stage career ==
Under the stage name Beatriz Bronte, Michelena appeared in the musical comedy A Girl From Dixie in 1904. and later toured as the title-character in George Ade's Peggy From Paris.

On Sunday, March 3, 1907, Michelena married George E. Middleton, a prominent San Francisco automobile dealer, the "happy culmination" of a romance that had begun in their school days. The private wedding took place at 232 Divisadero Street, the home of the parents of bridesmaid Margaret McGovern, "a lifelong friend of the bride". Judge Thomas F. Graham performed the ceremony. The couple spent a few weeks in Los Angeles for their honeymoon.

Middleton was the manager of the local Middleton Motor Car Company and the son of a California timber baron. He introduced Michelena to his society friends and business partners, including the trustees of Charles Crocker's estate who had rebuilt the St. Francis Hotel after the 1906 earthquake and fire.

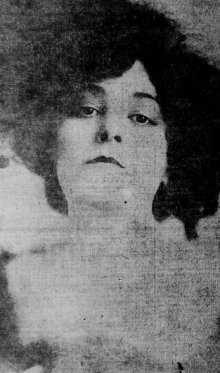
Michelena in 1910

After two years spent absent from the stage, in October 1910, "Beatriz Michelena Middleton" received a "full ovation" at the Garrick Theater for her role in The White Hen, a musical comedy set in Austria. Rotund comedian Max Dill, leader of the acting company, was the star of the show, given 14 minutes of applause upon entering the stage. For her performance, Michelena was sent flowers worth "a small fortune", according to the San Francisco Call's theater writer, Walter Anthony. Starring actress Lora Lieb, native to San Francisco but unknown as a performer, took less applause.

Middleton and Michelena gave an interview to Anthony after The White Hen was an established hit. Middleton said that he had kept his wife off the stage, that he "didn't like the idea of musical comedy", but would not have objected to her appearance in "grand opera". Nonetheless, he agreed to an offer from Max Dill. Michelena said that she had so far spent her married life studying to perform three operatic roles: Carmen and Micaëla in Carmen, and Violetta Valéry in La traviata. She said that prior to appearing at the Garrick Theater, she had been afraid that her stage training had been lost. Michelena said she had to overcome her fears as well as her husband's objections.

At the end of November, Michelena quit Dill's company, reporting that she had been billed underneath Lora Lieb in theater publicity, against the arrangement she had made with company manager Nat A. Magner. She said she refused to put her famous family name in second place.

On December 6, 1910, a story in the Call talked about Michelena and her sister having been "discovered" seven years previously by John Slocum, the manager who worked with the girls in the Princess Chic company. According to the story, Slocum had been trying to get Michelena to sign a long-term contract, but was beaten out in that regard by Middleton, "the athlete and clubman about town", whom she had married. A week earlier, Michelena had "caused a sensation" by resigning from the Max Dill company, but subsequently agreed to appear for four performances in Slocum's traveling production of The Kissing Girl, normally featuring Michelena's good friend, the actress Texas Guinan, who was willing to step down for a few days while Michelena covered the starring role of Christina. Michelena was quoted as saying,

"Leo Cooper, seven years ago, insisted that Mr. Slocum should hear two youngsters sing. The youngsters were Vera and myself. He was good enough to have confidence in us and gave us positions in his 'Princess Chic' company, where we rose afterward, through his encouragement and help, to prima donna posts. In memory of these kindnesses of the past and because I love the work, I have been happy to say 'yes' to his request that I appear with his company a few times for auld lang syne before 'The Kissing Girl' goes on her osculatory way."

Following the three performances in San Francisco and one in Oakland, Michelena and her husband took seats in the audience to watch Guinan perform the play's title role in San Jose's Victory Theater on December 15.

Michelena excelled in a singing role in The Tik-Tok Man of Oz in 1913. That year, during the autumn season, Michelena was a featured star of the Mechanics' Fair, an engineering and auto show in San Francisco. Following that, she sang at the inauguration of the Lincoln Highway, the nation's first transcontinental road. The western terminus celebration at the Valencia Theatre in San Francisco was organized by the Motor Car Dealers' Association, October 31, 1913.

== California Motion Picture Company ==
Middleton set up the California Motion Picture Company in San Rafael in 1912 for the purpose of shooting promotional footage of the automobiles he was selling. He determined that his pretty wife could star in movies made by his company. By 1914, Middleton and Michelena were making three major films at the same time.

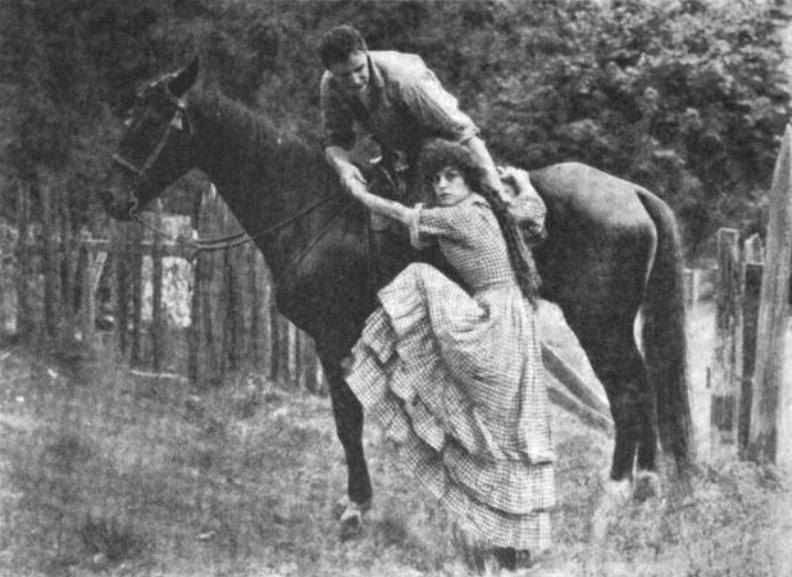
During the shooting of Salomy Jane, Michelena posed for a publicity still with leading man House Peters.

The first feature completed by CMPC was Salomy Jane, screened initially at the St. Francis Hotel by invitation only. Michelena's role was Bret Harte's Salomy Jane Clay, an energetic daughter of an emigrant miner. She is wooed by four men but prefers a fifth played by British heartthrob House Peters.

The movie saw limited nationwide distribution and was judged a hit by viewers who were impressed by the wild California scenery: giant redwood trees, winding roads hugging rocky bluffs and the Russian River Michelena's dominant portrayal of the title role was also an appeal. Journalist Josephine Clifford McCracken wrote of her in the June 1915 issue of Overland Monthly:

"Daughter of a renowned tenor of San Francisco's pioneer days, herself a prima donna with an assured place on the modern operatic stage, a girl with a wealth of artistic tradition behind her, Miss Michelena's gifts do not stop there. She has rare beauty, vivacity, wit, intellectual attainments and athletic grace."

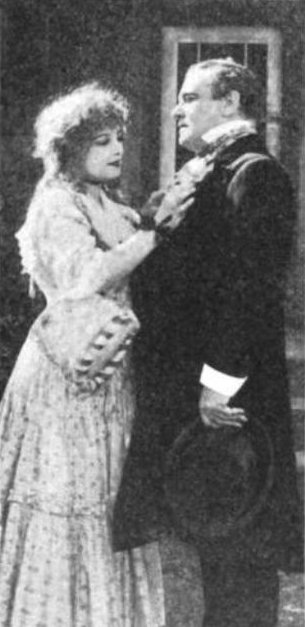
Michelena with Andrew Robson in The Lily of Poverty Flat (1915)

One CMPC shooting location was on family property near Boulder Creek, California where Middleton's father had established a timber holding now known as the Middleton Tract. Other filming locations included undeveloped portions of Sonoma, Santa Cruz and Marin counties. In San Rafael, the studio boasted a large glass-walled and -roofed building that let in light but not wind so that shooting for indoor scenes could take place in full light without the telltale flapping of tablecloths and clothing blown by gusts. Considered expensive at the time, the company used a US$1,250 Bell & Howell movie camera, worth about $39,800 in current value. The camera held two reels of film so that two negatives were made of each scene. A second $700 camera provided a third reel of the same scene, from another perspective.

Even though Salomy Jane didn't return a profit (likely due to second-string distribution channels), its favorable reception convinced Middleton that his wife could challenge the world's top movie star, Mary Pickford. Every CMPC movie was from that time forward intended to be a star vehicle for Michelena. Unfortunately, Michelena's ego expanded with the glowing reviews of her skill, and her demands for star treatment brought heavier expenses to productions that continued to lose money. Mignon, The Lily of Poverty Flat, A Phyllis of the Sierras, Salvation Nell, and The Rose of the Misty Pool all failed to turn a profit, and a lavish production of Faust which was in production in 1915 was given until the end of the year to be completed. Faust wasn't done by January 1916, and CMPC president Herbert Payne shut the film company down and filed for bankruptcy. Faust was never released.

== Writer ==
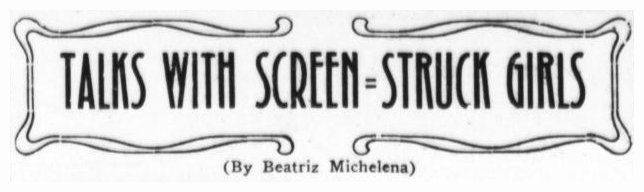

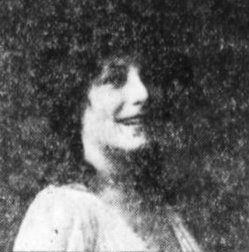
Michelena's newspaper column photo

In 1915 and 1916, Michelena wrote the regular newspaper column "Talks with Screen-struck Girls", carried at first by the San Rafael Independent on Tuesdays but then appeared on Sundays in other newspapers: San Francisco Examiner and the Prescott Journal-Miner (Arizona). She wrote about the ideal qualities found in an actress, and what girls might do to develop them.

She received a torrent of letters from readers—many were from girls asking "Must I be able to ride" and "Must I be able to swim". In response, Michelena described in the column how those skills were helpful to a movie actress, but not absolutely necessary; she said they "are accessories to, rather than the substance of the thing ... I would advise every girl entering motion pictures to learn to ride and swim and do all the rest of it, but I would have her realize their subordination to the really artistic side of the profession."'

On May 7, 1916, Michelena wrote to caution girls wishing for fame on the silver screen that many like themselves ended up "broken in spirit", with shattered expectations. She advised them to stay home and avoid "bitter disappointment" in movie making. In July, she discussed some of the specifics of the mental challenges of acting:

"There are a hundred little peculiarities that index the character of practically every type of person, and it is the effectiveness with which one grasps, understands and utilizes these peculiarities that makes him or her a great dramatic artist ... The truly great actress ... must not only recognize the traits as she sees them outwardly manifested, but she must also get beneath the skin and recognize the conditions of thought or emotion that give rise to them. Then, and this is the really great test of her talents, she must so lose herself in those conditions of thought and emotion, and feel through them, that her mimicry of their outward manifestations comes naturally and without conscious endeavor."

In addition to her column, Michelena wrote occasional articles intended for a wider readership. She wrote in October 1916 about the history of the moving picture industry in a multiple-article series, beginning her account with a retelling of Eadweard Muybridge's action photograph of Governor Leland Stanford's racehorse named Occident. She defined this high-speed image as essential to the development of moving pictures.

== Michelena Studios ==
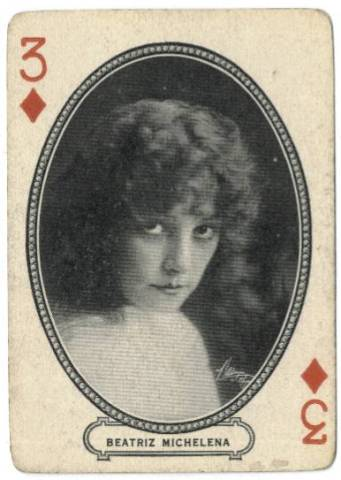
Michelena on a playing card

Middleton and Michelena bought their bankrupt film company for "a few thousand dollars" in 1917 and renamed it Michelena Studios. Their new company was called Beatriz Michelena Features, and shooting began on their next feature-length film, Just Squaw. Michelena's lead character was a white woman raised by American Indians, a woman who does not realize her racial heritage until after she falls into forbidden love with a white man. The movie played for only a week in San Francisco in 191, and did not return a profit.

The moviemakers' new distributor, Robertson-Cole, was unable to find the right market for Heart of Juanita and The Flame of Hellgate in 1920. American audiences had grown more sophisticated, yet Michelena Studios was still employing their earlier production techniques. After shooting The Flame of Hellgate, Middleton and Michelena stopped making movies altogether. She returned to her singing performances and he returned to his car sales. They reportedly divorced in the mid-1920s, though Middleton told the 1930 US Census that they were married. The union produced no children.

== Retirement and final years ==
After leaving film work, Michelena continued with her singing career, and toured Latin America (1927) where she was warmly received as part of a 30-person troupe of singers and dancers performing the operas Carmen and Madama Butterfly. The San Francisco Chronicle reported that this was "the first invasion of those countries by an American operatic star in repertoire performances". Afterward, she retired from singing, and returned to San Rafael to live near her old film studio. Between 1937 and 1941, she sold 10 of the 26 real estate parcels that together had formed her studio lot. She died on October 10, 1942, at St. Mary's Hospital, San Francisco, following surgery.

== Legacy ==
The Michelena Features studio facility in San Rafael sat empty through the 1920s with its solitary metal-clad brick vault housing all the company's nitrate films, including the earlier ones shot by CMPC. In 1931, boys playing with a firecracker at the deserted lot set the vault and all of its flammable contents spectacularly on fire. Every known copy of Michelena's movies was destroyed, a loss that Middleton estimated at $200,000; worth about $4.2 million today. In 1996, an 82-year-old nitrate copy of Salomy Jane was found in Australia; it was sent to the Library of Congress for preservation. Awareness of Michelena's contribution to early film, and her role as a groundbreaking Hispanic star, rose in 2002 with a proclamation made by President George W. Bush upon the occasion of National Hispanic Heritage Month in which he listed her as one of America's influential Latino actors. In 2008, a new print of Salomy Jane was released for limited distribution.

== Filmography ==
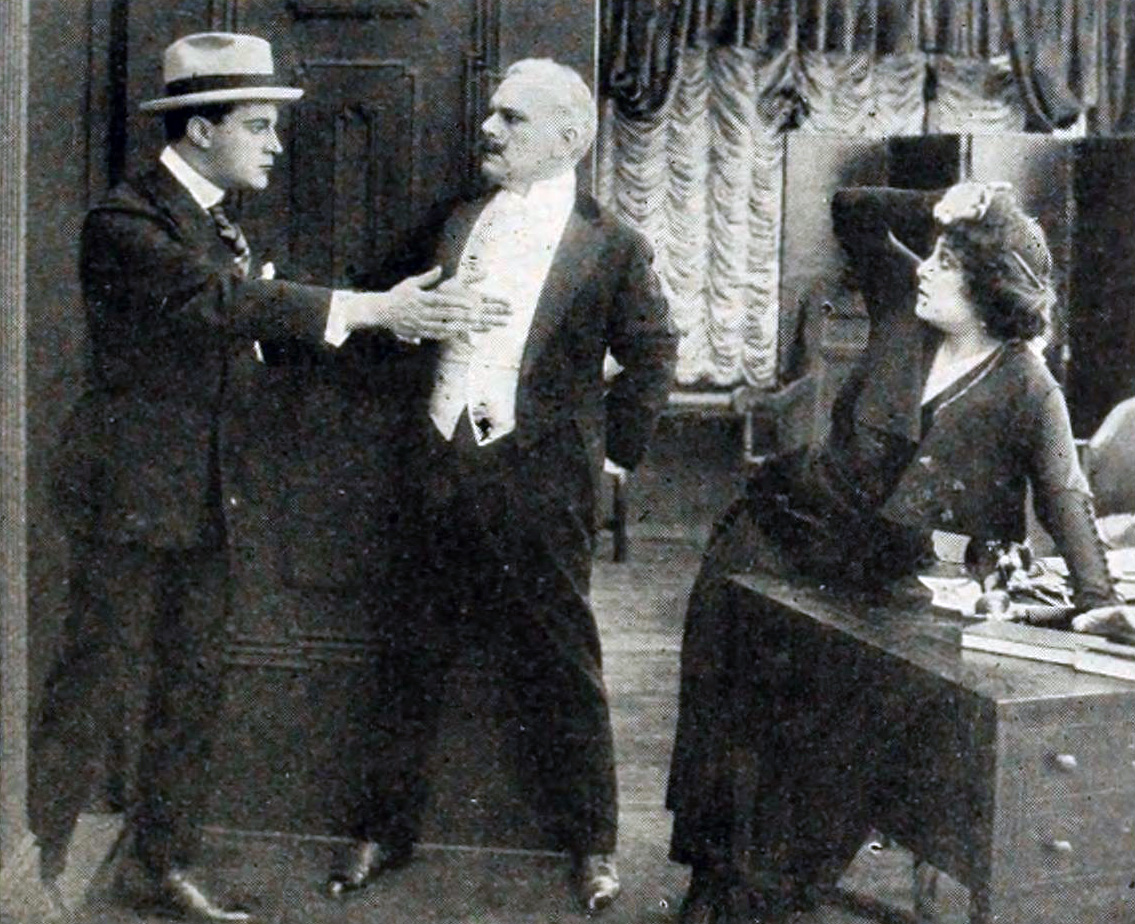
The Woman Who Dared (1916)

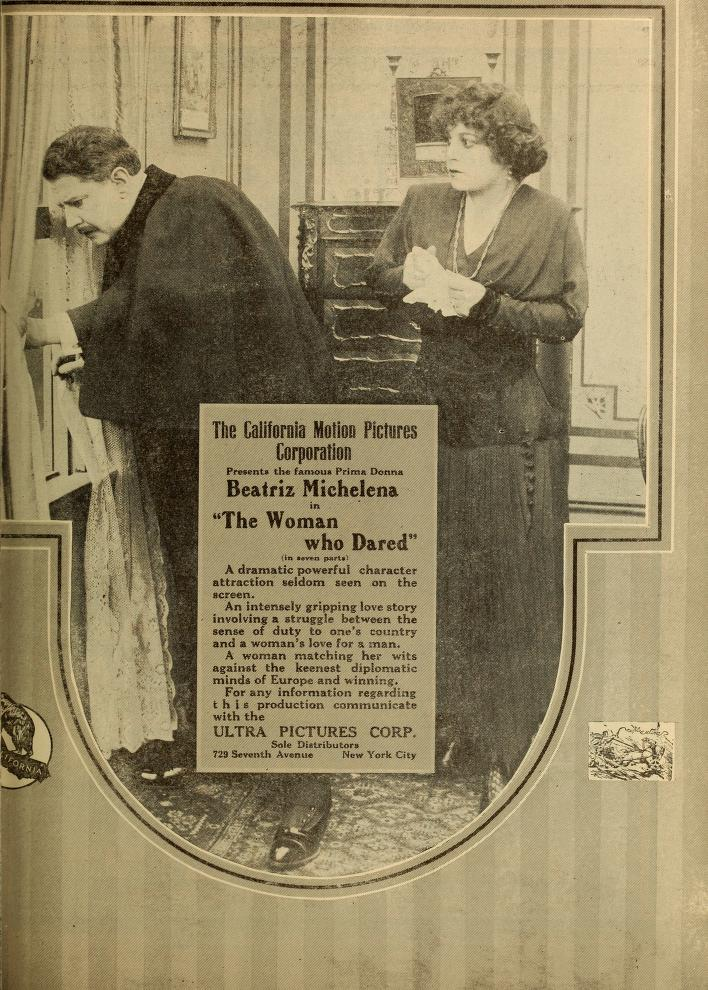
The Woman Who Dared (1916)

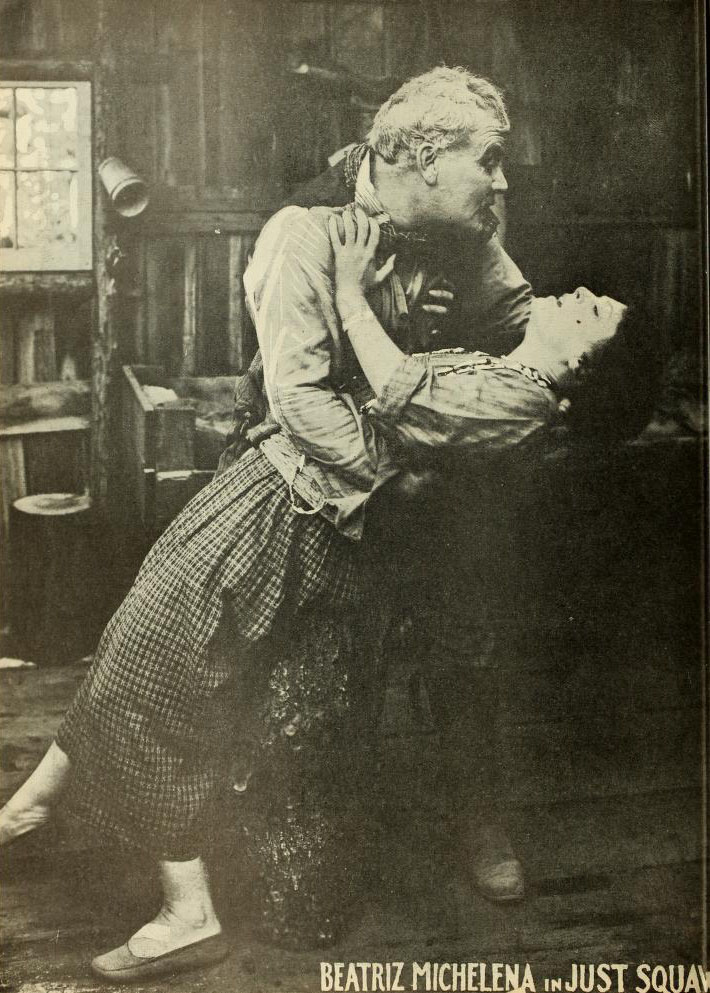
In Just Squaw (1919)

| Year | Film | Role | Other notes |
|---|---|---|---|
| 1914 | Salomy Jane | Salomy Jane Clay | Michelena injured herself doing her stunts |
| 1914 | Mrs. Wiggs of the Cabbage Patch | Lovey Mary | |
| 1915 | Mignon | Mignon | from three Bret Harte poems; Charles Kenyon wrote the scenario |
| 1915 | The Lily of Poverty Flat | Lily Folinsbee | |
| 1915 | A Phyllis of the Sierras | Minty Sharpe | from a Bret Harte story |
| 1915 | Salvation Nell (1915 film) | Nell Saunders | based on Edward Sheldon's play of the same name, lost film |
| 1915 | The Rose of the Misty Pool | Rose | Charles Kenyon wrote the scenario |
| 1916 | The Unwritten Law | Kate Wilson | |
| 1916 | The Woman Who Dared | Princess Beatrix de Rohan | |
| 1919 | Just Squaw | Fawn | Only four of five reels survive today at the Library of Congress. |
| 1919 | The Price Woman Pays | Margueritee | |
| 1920 | Heart of Juanita | Juanita | Michelena produced this film, first shot in 1916 as The Passion Flower |
| 1920 | The Flame of Hellgate | Star Dowell | |

== See also ==
- Myrtle Gonzalez
- List of Hispanic and Latino American actors
