= List of Hispanic and Latino American actors =

This is a list of notable Hispanic and Latino American actors.

To be included in this list, the person must have a Wikipedia article and/or references showing the person is an American of Hispanic and Latino origin and a notable actor.

The list is organized in chronological order of birth decades. The names are organised in alphabetical order.

== List ==
=== 1850s ===
- Fernando Michelena (1858–1921) Venezuelan born actor and tenor, migrated in United States was engaged with his wife the soprano Francis Lenord by the Emma Abbott Grand Opera Company a traveling theatre company that performed famous operas translated into English for American audience

=== 1870s ===
- Bijou Fernandez (1877–1961) Broadway actress from New York City

=== 1880s ===
- Teresa Luisa Michelena (1889–1941) American actress and screenwriter known as Donna Barrell. She was daughter of Venezuelan born tenor and actor Fernando Michelena (1858–1921)
- Leo Carrillo (1880–1961) Californio actor best known for playing Pancho in the popular television series The Cisco Kid (1950–1956)
- Steve Clemente (1885–1950) Mexican-understanding American actor known for his many villainous roles
- Pedro de Cordoba (1881–1950) American actor of Cuban and French descent
- Al Ernest Garcia (1887–1938) American actor of Mexican descent
- Vera Michelena (1885–1961) American actress and contralto prima donna. She was daughter of Venezuelan born tenor Fernando Michelena and half sister of Donna Barrell.
- Antonio Moreno (1887–1967) Spanish-born American actor

=== 1890s ===
- William Gaxton (1893–1963) Californio actor and cousin of Leo Carrillo
- Myrtle Gonzalez (1891–1918) American actress of Californio and Irish descent
- Chris-Pin Martin (1893–1953) American actor of Mexican descent
- Beatriz Michelena (1890–1942) American actress and singer. She was sister of Vera Michelena
- Ramon Novarro (1899–1968) Mexican-born American actor
- Carlos De Valdez (1894–1939) - Peruvian-born American film actor.

=== 1900s ===
- Don Alvarado (1904–1967) American actor of Mexican descent
- Rosa Castro Martínez, Venezuelan born silent movies actress
- Thomas Gomez (1905–1971) American actor of Spaniard descent
- Linda Loredo (1907–1931) American actress of Mexican descent
- Carlos Montalbán (1903–1991) Mexican-born American actor
- Ramon Novarro (1899–1968) Mexican-born American actor
- Dolores del Río (1904–1983) Mexican-born American actress
- Gilbert Roland (1905–1994) Mexican-born American actor
- Cesar Romero (1907–1994) American actor of Cuban and Spaniard descent
- Raquel Torres (1908–1987) Mexican-born American actress of Mexican and German descent
- Lupe Vélez (1908–1944) Mexican-born American actress
- Carmen Miranda (1909–1955) Luso-brazilian actress and singer

=== 1910s ===
- Rico Alaniz (1919–2015) Mexican-born American actor in film and television (The Life and Legend of Wyatt Earp)
- Desi Arnaz (1917–1986) Cuban-born American actor (I Love Lucy) He also co-founded and owned Desilu Productions with his then-wife Lucille Ball.
- Pedro Armendariz (1912–1963) Mexican-born American actor
- Gus Arriola (1917-2008) Was a Mexican-American comic strip cartoonist and animator, primarily known for the award-winning comic strip, Gordo, and animating Tom and Jerry and Lonesome Stranger cartoons for the Metro-Goldwyn-Mayer cartoon studio. He also directed training films for the United States Army during World War II.
- Alma Beltran (1919–2007) Mexican-born American film, stage and television actress.
- Ralph Camargo (1912–1992) American actor of Mexican descent
- Movita Castaneda (1916–2015) American actress of Mexican descent
- José Ferrer (1912–1992) Puerto Rican-born American actor
- Mel Ferrer (1917–2008) American actor of Cuban and Irish descent
- Rita Hayworth (1918–1987) American actress to a Spanish father
- Tom Hernández (1915–1984) Spanish-born American actor
- Fernando Lamas (1916–1982) Argentine-born American actor
- Bill Melendez (1916–2008) Mexican-born American voice actor, character animator, film director and producer (Peanuts animated specials)
- Maria Montez (1912–1951) Dominican-born American actress
- Anthony Quinn (1915–2001) Mexican-born American actor
- Mona Rico (1907–1994) Mexican-born American actress
- Andy Russell (1919–1992) American actor and singer to Mexican immigrant parents
- Ref Sanchez (1917–1986) American actor of Spaniard descent
- Renee Torres (1911–1998) Mexican American actress and the sister of Raquel Torres.
- Lupita Tovar (1910–2016) Mexican-born American actress
- Lupe Vélez (1908–1944) Mexican-born American actress who was one of the first successful Latin American actresses in the United States
- Natividad Vacío (1912–1996) American actor of Mexican descent

=== 1920s ===
- Rodolfo Acosta (1920–1974) American actor of Mexican descent
- Sammy Davis Jr. (1925–1990) American actor, singer, dancer, vaudevillian, and comedian. He was son of the American dancer and stage performer Elvera Sanchez (1905–2000). His mother was of Cuban descent.
- Rebeca Iturbide (1924–2003) American actress of Mexican descent
- Pedro Gonzalez-Gonzalez (1925–2006) American actor of Mexican descent
- Pepe Hern (1927–2009) American actor of Spanish descent. He was brother of Tom Hernández
- Katy Jurado (1924–2002) Mexican-born American actress
- Tony Martinez (1920–2002) Puerto Rican-born American film, television and theatre actor.
- Ricardo Montalbán (1920–2009) Mexican-born American actor
- Luis Oquendo (1925–1992) Cuban-born American actor
- Antonia Rey (1926–2019) Cuban-born American actress
- Lalo Ríos (1927–1973) Mexican-born American actor
- Marquita Rivera (1922–2002) Puerto Rican-born American actress, singer and dancer
- Olga San Juan (1927–2009) American actress of Puerto Rican descent
- Elena Verdugo (1925-2017) American actress of Californio-Mexican descent
- Carmen Zapata (1927–2014) American actress of Mexican and Argentine descent

=== 1930s ===
- Victor Argo (1934–2004) American actor of Puerto Rican descent
- Rafael Campos (1936 - 1985) Dominican-born American actor
- Míriam Colón (1936–2017) Puerto Rican-born American actress
- Linda Cristal (1931 - 2020) Argentinian-born American actress
- Henry Darrow (born Enrique Tomás Delgado Jiménez; 1933–2021) American actor of Puerto Rican descent
- Raúl Dávila (1931–2006) Puerto Rican-born American actor (All My Children)
- Héctor Elizondo (1936–) New Yorker actor of Puerto Rican descent
- Hampton Fancher (1938–) American actor, screenwriter, and filmmaker to a Mexican-Danish mother (Blade Runner and Blade Runner 2049)
- Abel Fernandez (1930–2016) American actor of Native Mexican descent
- John Gavin (1931–2018) American actor of Chilean and Mexican descent (Spartacus, Psycho)
- Susan Kohner (1936–) American actress to Mexican actress Lupita Tovar and American Jewish film producer Paul Kohner
- Joaquin Martinez (1930–2012) Mexican-born American actor
- Tomas Milian (1933–2017) Cuban-born actor with American and Italian citizenship
- Louisa Moritz (1936–2019) Cuban-born American actress and lawyer
- Rita Moreno (1931–) Puerto Rican-born American actress
- Alejandro Rey (1930–1987) Argentine-born American actor
- Chita Rivera (1933–2024) American actress to a Puerto Rican father.
- Paul Sand (1932–) American actor of Mexican and Russian descent
- Gregory Sierra (1937–2021) is an American actor of Puerto Rican descent
- James Victor (1939-2016) was a Dominican born, American Actor

=== 1940s ===
- Robert Alvarez (1948–) is a retired American animator, storyboard artist, television director and writer.
- Tina Aumont (1946–2006) American actress. She was the daughter of French actor Jean-Pierre Aumont and Dominican actress Maria Montez
- Barbara Carrera (1945–) Nicaraguan-born American film and television actress
- Enrique Castillo (1949–)
- Emilio Delgado (1940–2022) American actor of Mexican descent
- Moctesuma Esparza (1949–) American actor of Mexican descent
- Erik Estrada (1949–) American actor of Puerto Rican descent (CHiPs)
- Lola Falana (1942–) American actress and singer to an Afro-Cuban father.
- Antonio Fargas (1946–) American actor of Puerto Rican and Trinidadian descent
- Raul Julia (1940–1994) Puerto Rican-born American actor
- Priscilla Lopez (1948–) American actress of Puerto Rican descent
- Cheech Marin (1946–) American actor of Mexican descent (part of the comedy act Cheech & Chong)
- Angélica María (1944–) American actress of Mexican descent and raised in Mexico
- A Martinez (1948–) American actor to a father of Mexican and Apache descent
- Yvette Mimieux (1942–) American retired television and film actress of French and Mexican descent
- Belita Moreno (1949) American actress of Mexican descent (George Lopez, Perfect Strangers)
- José Pérez (actor) (1940-) Puerto Rican-born American actor
- Miguel Piñero (1946–1988) Puerto Rican-born American playwright, actor
- Tina Romero (1949–) American actress of Mexican descent
- Mercedes Ruehl (1948–) American actress to a mother of Cuban and Irish ancestry
- Juana Samayoa (1948–) Guatemalan-American actress and television presenter.
- Martin Sheen (1940–) American actor of Spanish and Irish descent.
- Edward James Olmos (1947–) American actor of Mexican descent (Miami Vice, Battlestar Galactica).
- Lupe Ontiveros (1942–2012) American actress of Mexican descent
- Liz Torres (1947–) American actress of Puerto Rican descent
- Danny Trejo (1944–) American actor of Mexican descent
- Raquel Welch (1940–2023) American actress of Bolivian descent
- Holly Woodlawn (1946–2015) transgender Puerto Rican-born actress and Warhol superstar
- Victoria Wyndham (born Victoria Camargo; 1945–) American actress. She is the daughter of Mexican-American stage and screen actor Ralph Camargo (Another World)
- Richard Yniguez (1946-) American actor of Mexican descent

=== 1950s ===
- Paul Calderón (1959–) Puerto Rican actor, writer, director, and producer (King of New York, Four Rooms, Pulp Fiction)
- Juan Fernández de Alarcon (1956–) Dominican-born American actor
- Ana Alicia (1956–) Mexican-born American actress (Falcon Crest)
- María Conchita Alonso (1957–) Cuban-born Venezuelan-raised actress, singer and songwriter. She is naturalised in the US.
- Rick Aviles (1952–1995) American actor of Puerto Rican descent
- Desi Arnaz Jr. (1953–) American actor and musician. He is the son of Cuban actor Desi Arnaz and Lucille Ball
- Lucie Arnaz (1951–) is an American actress, singer, dancer, and producer. She is daughter of Desi Arnaz and Lucille Ball
- Steven Bauer (1956–) Cuban-born American actor
- Robert Beltran (1953–) American actor of Mexican descent (Star Trek: Voyager)
- Irene Cara (1959–2022) American singer, songwriter, dancer and actress of Puerto Rican and Cuban descent
- Lynda Carter (1951–) American actress to a Mexican mother (Wonder Woman)
- Roxann Dawson (1958–) American actress, producer, director, and writer (Star Trek: Voyager)
- Michael DeLorenzo (1959–) American actor, director, writer, producer, dancer, and musician of Puerto Rican and Italian descent
- Rosanna DeSoto (1950–) American actress of Mexican descent
- Emiliano Díez (1953–) Cuban-born American actor
- Shabba Doo (1955–2020) American actor, dancer, and choreographer of African American and Puerto Rican descent.
- Miguel Ferrer (1955–2017) American actor. He was son of Puerto Rican actor Jose Ferrer.
- Andy García (1956–) Cuban-born American actor
- Luis Guzmán (1956–) Puerto Rican-born
- Ruben Santiago-Hudson (1956–) American actor, playwright, and director of Puerto Rican and African American descent (Castle)
- Vincent Irizarry (1959–) American actor of Puerto Rican descent
- Apollonia Kotero (1959–) American singer, actress, former model and talent manager of Mexican descent
- Lorenzo Lamas (1958) American actor. He is son of Argentine actor Fernando Lamas (Falcon Crest)
- Sebastián Ligarde (1954–) American actor of Tejano and Mexican descent
- Sunshine Logroño (1951–) American-born Puerto Rican actor to a Puerto Rican mother
- Sonia Manzano (1950–) American actress, screenwriter, author, speaker and singer-songwriter of Puerto Rican descent
- Julio Oscar Mechoso (1955–2017) Cuban-born American actor
- Olga Merediz (1956–) Cuban-born American actress and singer.
- Taylor Negron (1957–2015) American actor of Puerto Rican descent
- Oscar Nunez (1958–) Cuban-born American actor (The Office. He was also a member of The Groundlings)
- Tony Oliver (1958–) Puerto Rican born American voice actor (Robotech, Fate/stay night, Lupin the Third).
- Luis Saguar (1957–2009) American actor
- Marcelino Sánchez (1957–1986) Puerto Rican-born American actor
- Miguel Sandoval (1951–) American actor of Mexican descent
- Saundra Santiago (1957–) American actress of Cuban and Puerto Rican descent (Miami Vice)
- Silvana Gallardo (1953–2012) American film and television actress of Venezuelan descent
- Johnny Sanchez (1958–) American actor, writer, and film producer
- Jimmy Smits (1955–) American actor of Puerto Rican and Surinamese descent
- Madeleine Stowe (1958–) American actress to a Costa Rican mother
- Elizabeth Peña (1959–2014) American actress, writer, panelist and musician of Cuban descent
- Tony Plana (1952–) Cuban-born American actor and director (Ugly Betty)
- Freddie Prinze (1954–1977) American stand-up comedian and actor of Puerto Rican and German descent
- Vanessa del Rio (1952–) American retired pornographic actress of Puerto Rican and Cuban descent
- José Rivera (1955–) Puerto Rican playwright living in Hollywood, California
- Marco Rodríguez (1953–)
- Paul Rodriguez (1955–) Mexican-born American actor
- Rachel Ticotin (1958–) American film and television actress of Jewish and Puerto Rican descend
- Eddie Velez (1958–) American actor of Puerto Rican descent (The A-Team)
- Daniel Zacapa (1951–) Honduran-born American movie actor.

=== 1960s ===
- Rose Abdoo (1962 –) American actress and comedian. She is of Dominican and Lebanese descent (Gilmore Girls, That's So Raven).
- Carlos Alazraqui (1962–) American actor, stand-up comedian, impressionist, producer and screenwriter of Argentine descent (Reno 911!)
- Trini Alvarado (1967–) American actress of Spanish and Puerto Rican descent
- Nelson Ascencio (1964–) Cuban-born American actor and comedian (member in MADtv; Actor in The Hunger Games film series)
- Maria Canals-Barrera (1966–) American actress of Cuban descent (Wizards of Waverly Place)
- Maurice Benard (born Mauricio José Morales; 1963–) American actor of Salvadorian and Nicaraguan descent
- Benjamin Bratt (1963–) American actor to a Peruvian mother
- Jesse Borrego (1962–) American actor of Mexican descent (Fame, 24, Dexter).
- Danny Burstein (1964–) American actor and singer to a Costa Rican mother
- Néstor Carbonell (1967–) American actor of Cuban descent (Suddenly Susan, Lost, Bates Motel, The Dark Knight)
- Laura Cerón (1964–) Mexican-born American actress
- Kevin Corrigan (1969–). American actor to an Irish father and a Puerto Rican mother (Grounded for Life).
- Raymond Cruz (1961–) American actor of Mexican descent (The Closer, Major Crimes, Breaking Bad)
- Idalis DeLeón (1969–) American actress of Afro Puerto Rican descent
- Joey Diaz (1963–) Cuban-born American comedian, actor, and podcast host.
- Sully Diaz (1960–) American actress of Puerto Rican descent
- Mónica Dionne (1967–) American actress of Mexican descent
- Colman Domingo (1969–) American actor, writer and director to a Belizean father of Guatemalan descent
- Richard Esteras (1968-) American actor of Mexican and Puerto Rican descent
- Michelle Forbes (1965–) American actress of partly Mexican descent (Guiding Light, Homicide: Life on the Street, True Blood)
- Daisy Fuentes (1966–) Cuban-born American actress
- Franky G (1965–) American film and television actor. He is of Puerto Rican descent
- Mo Gallini (1966–) American actor of Lebanese and Cuban descent
- Jsu Garcia (1963–) American actor of Cuban descent
- Carlos Gómez (1962–) American actor of Cuban descent
- Ian Gomez (1965–) American actor of Puerto Rican and Russian Jewish descent (Felicity, Cougar Town)
- Marga Gomez (1960–) American actress of Cuban and Puerto Rican descent
- Laura Harring (née Martínez-Herring; 1964–) Mexican-born American actress
- Salma Hayek (1966–) Mexican-born American actress
- Thom Adcox-Hernandez (1960–) American voice and television actor of Colombian descent (Falcon Crest, The Twisted Tales of Felix the Cat, Gargoyles)
- Gledys Ibarra (1960–) Venezuelan-born American actress
- Eva LaRue (1966–) American actress of partially Puerto Rican descent (All My Children, CSI: Miami)
- Kamala Lopez American-born filmmaker, actress, writer, director, and political activist. She is of Venezuelan and Indian descent
- John Leguizamo (1964–) Colombian-born American actor
- George Lopez (1961–) American actor of Mexican descent
- Jennifer Lopez (1969–) American actress and singer of Puerto Rican descent
- Faizon Love (1968–) Cuban-born American actor and comedian
- Florencia Lozano (1969–) American actress of Argentine descent (One Life to Live)
- Vanessa Marcil (1968–) Her father is Mexican (General Hospital, Beverly Hills, 90210, Las Vegas)
- Eddie Marrero (1962–) American actor of Puerto Rican descent
- Constance Marie (1965–) American actress of Mexican descent (George Lopez)
- Carlos Mencia (1967–) Honduran-born American comedian, writer, and actor
- Alex Meneses (1965–) American actress of Mexican and Ukrainian descent
- Jorge Merced (1965–) New York-based Puerto Rican actor, theatre director, and gay activist.
- Esai Morales (1962–) American actor of Puerto Rican descent
- Rene L. Moreno (1969–) American actor of Mexican descent
- Miguel A. Núñez Jr. (1964–) American actor of African American and Dominican descent
- John Ortiz (1968–) American actor of Puerto Rican descent
- Rosie Perez (1964–) American actress of Puerto Rican descent
- Judy Reyes (1967–) American actress of Dominican descent (Scrubs, Devious Maids)
- Kamar de los Reyes (1967–) Puerto Rican-born American actor
- Philip Anthony-Rodriguez (1968–) American actor and voice actor (Jake 2.0 and video game Grand Theft Auto: Vice City)
- Valente Rodriguez (1964–) American actor of Mexican descent
- Nelson de la Rosa (1967/1968–2006) Dominican-born American actor and one of the shortest men of the 20th and 21st centuries.
- Johnny A. Sanchez (1968–) American stand-up comedian and actor of Mexican descent
- Lauren Sánchez (1969–) American actress, news anchor, entertainment reporter, media personality, producer, pilot and entrepreneur. She is of Mexican descent
- Talisa Soto (1967–) American actress of Puerto Rican descent
- Gina Torres (1969–) American actress of Cuban descent (Suits)
- Oscar Torre - (1967–) American actor of Cuban descent
- Benicio del Toro (1967–) Puerto Rican-born American actor
- Gabriel Traversari (1963–) American actor and director of Nicaraguan descent
- Rose Troche (1964–) American film and television director, television producer, and screenwriter of Puerto Rican descent
- Randy Vasquez (1961–) American actor and director to a Mexican father
- Yul Vazquez (1965–) Cuban-born American actor and musician.
- Daphne Rubin-Vega (1969–) Panamanian-born American actress, dancer and singer-songwriter.
- Lauren Vélez (1964–) American actress of Puerto Rican descent (Dexter, Ugly Betty, Oz)
- Lorraine Vélez (1964–) American actress of Puerto Rican descent. She is sister of Lauren Vélez
- Lisa Vidal (1965–) American actress of Puerto Rican descent (Third Watch, The Division, ER, and The Event)
- David Zayas (1962–) Puerto Rican-born New Yorker raised (Dexter)
- Daphne Zuniga (1962–) American actress to a Guatemalan father
- José Zúñiga (1965–) Honduran-born American actor.

=== 1970s ===
- Kirk Acevedo (1971–) American actor of Puerto Rican descent
- Laz Alonso (1974–) American actor of Afro-Cuban descent.
- Kevin Alejandro (1976–) American actor to Mexican parents (Southland, Lucifer, True Blood)
- Tatyana Ali (1979–) American actress. Her mother is Afro-Panamanian (The Fresh Prince of Bel-Air)
- Daniella Alonso (1978–) American actress of Puerto Rican and Peruvian descent
- Cristela Alonzo (1979–) American comedian, actress, writer and producer of Mexican descent
- Alexis Amore (born Fabiola Melgar García; 1978 –) Peruvian-born American pornographic actress and feature dancer
- Yancey Arias (1971–) American actor of Puerto Rican and Colombian descent
- Linda Arsenio (1978–) American actress to a Salvadoran mother
- Charlotte Ayanna (1976–). Puerto Rican-born actress and former Miss Teen USA.
- Omar Avila - (1979–) Cuban-born American actor
- Rosa Blasi (1972–) American actress and therapist of partial Puerto Rican descent
- Lillo Brancato (1976–) Colombian-born American actor, although raised in an Italian-American family (A Bronx Tale, The Sopranos).
- Héctor Luis Bustamante (1972–) Colombian-born American actor.
- Vladimir Caamaño (1979–) American comedian and actor of Dominican descent
- Christian Camargo (1971-) American actor, director, producer and writer of Mexican descent (Dexter, The Hurt Locker, Penny Dreadful, See)
- Bobby Cannavale, American actor of Italian and Cuban descent (Third Watch, Will & Grace)
- Steve Cardenas (1974–) American martial artist, musician, and semi retired actor of Mexican descent (Mighty Morphin Power Rangers)
- Matt Cedeño (1974–) American actor and former male fashion model of Afro-Cuban and English-Irish descent (Days of Our Lives)
- Eddie Cibrian (1973–) American actor of Cuban descent (CSI: Miami)
- Ricardo Antonio Chavira (1971–) American actor of Mexican descent (Desperate Housewives)
- Charissa Chamorro (1977–) American television actress of Chilean descent
- Mark Consuelos (1971–) Spanish-born American actor of Mexican and Italian descent (All My Children, Riverdale)
- Alexis Cruz (1974–) American actor of Puerto Rican descent (Touched by an Angel)
- Valerie Cruz (1976–) American actress of Cuban descent
- Wilson Cruz (1973–) American actor of Puerto Rican descent (Star Trek: Discovery)
- Rosario Dawson (1979–) American actress to a mother of Afro-Cuban and Puerto Rican ancestry (Marvel's Netflix television series, The Mandalorian)
- Kate del Castillo (1972–) Mexican-born American actress (Muchachitas, Alguna vez tendremos alas, La Mentira, Ramona, Bajo la misma piel).
- Cameron Diaz (1972–) American actress to a father of Cuban origin
- Guillermo Díaz (1975–) American actor of Cuban descent (Scandal)
- Felipe Esparza (1976–) Mexican-born American actor
- Raúl Esparza (1970–) American actor to Cuban parents (Law & Order: Special Victims Unit)
- Jade Esteban Estrada (1975–) American singer, actor, stand-up comedian, journalist and human rights activist of Mexican descent.
- David Fumero (1972–) Cuban-born American actor and former male fashion model (One Life to Live)
- Gene Gabriel (1970–) American actor and writer of Cuban descent
- Gloria Garayua (1978–) American film and television actress of Puerto Rican descent
- Paula Garcés (1974–) Colombian-born American film and TV actress (The Shield, All My Children)
- Aimee Garcia (1978–) Her mother is Mexican and her father is Puerto Rican (George Lopez, Lucifer).
- Jeffrey Garcia (1977–) American comedian, actor and voice actor of Mexican descent
- JoAnna García (1979–) American actress of Cuban and Spanish descent (Are You Afraid of the Dark?, Freaks and Geeks, Reba).
- Jorge Garcia (1973–) American actor of Cuban and Chilean descent (Lost, Alcatraz, Hawaii Five-0)
- Mayte Garcia (1973–) American dancer, actress and singer of Puerto Rican descent
- Alana de la Garza (1976–) American actress of Mexican and Irish descent (Law & Order)
- Zabryna Guevara (1972-) American actress of Colombian descent (3 lbs, Gotham)
- Mandy Gonzalez (1978–) American actress of Mexican and Jewish descent.
- Nicholas Gonzalez (1976–) American actor of Mexican descent (Resurrection Blvd., The Good Doctor)
- Rick Gonzalez (1979–) American actor of Puerto Rican and Dominican descent
- Adrian Grenier (1976–) American actor, producer, director, musician and environmentalist. His mother is of Mexican and French descent (Entourage).
- La'Myia Good (1979–) American actress. Her paternal grandmother is of Puerto Rican descent.
- Illich Guardiola (1972–) Honduran–born American voice actor
- Camille Guaty (1978–) American actress of Puerto Rican and Cuban descent
- Elizabeth Gutiérrez (1979–) American actress of Mexican descent
- Zulay Henao (1979–) Colombian-born American actress
- Wilson Jermaine Heredia (1971–) American actor of Dominican descent
- Jay Hernandez (1978–) American actor of Mexican descent
- Maximiliano Hernández (1973–) American actor of Honduran descent
- Gabriel Iglesias (1976) American actor of Mexican descent
- Oscar Isaac (1979–) Guatemalan-born American actor (Star Wars sequel trilogy, Marvel Cinematic Universe)
- Cherie Johnson (1976–) American actress of Puerto Rican and African American descent (Punky Brewster, Family Matters)
- Josh Keaton - (1979–) American actor, singer and musical producer. His mother is of Peruvian origin.
- David Lago (1979–) American actor of Cuban descent
- Selenis Leyva (1972–) American actress of Cuban and Dominican descent (Orange Is the New Black, Diary of a Future President).
- Iyari Limón (1976–) Mexican-born American actress
- Eva Longoria (1975–) American actress of Mexican descent
- Mario Lopez (1973–) American actor of Mexican descent (Saved by the Bell)
- Diego Luna (1979–) Mexican actor, writer, director (Andor)
- Gina Lynn (1974–) Puerto Rican-born former pornographic actress, model, and stripper
- Al Madrigal (1971–) American comedian, writer, actor and producer of Mexican descent
- Alicia Machado (1976–) Venezuelan-born American actress
- Justina Machado (1972–) American actress of Puerto Rican descent (One Day at a Time, Six Feet Under, Queen of the South)
- Benito Martinez (1971) American actor of Guatemalan descent (The Shield)
- Ricardo Medina, Jr. (1977–) American former actor of Puerto Rican descent (Power Rangers Wild Force, Power Rangers Samurai)
- Eva Mendes (1974–) American actress of Cuban descent
- Enrique Murciano (1973–) American actor of Cuban descent (Without a Trace)
- Marisol Nichols (1973–) American actress of Mexican and Russian Jewish / Hungarian Jewish descent (24)
- Amaury Nolasco (1970–) Puerto Rican-born American actor (Prison Break)
- Rigo Nova (1979–) Honduran-born American actor and writer
- America Olivo (1978–) American actress and singer to a father of Italian, Basque, Spanish and Chilean descent
- Karen Olivo (1976–) American stage and television actress and singer to a father of Puerto Rican and Native American descent, and a mother of Dominican and Chinese descent
- Ana Ortiz (1971–) American actress of Puerto Rican and Irish descent (Ugly Betty)
- Lana Parrilla (1977–) American actress of Puerto Rican and Italian descent (Once Upon a Time, 24)
- Pedro Pascal (1975–) Chilean-born American actor (Game of Thrones, Narcos)
- Kika Perez (1979–) Colombian-born American actress
- Michael Peña (1976–) American actor of Mexican descent
- Danny Pino (1974–) American actor of Cuban descent (Cold Case)
- Carlos Ponce (1972–) Puerto Rican-born American actor
- Freddie Prinze Jr. (1976–) Son of American actor of Puerto Rican descent Freddie Prinze (I Know What You Did Last Summer, Scooby-Doo)
- Dania Ramirez (1979–) Dominican-born American actress (Heroes, The Sopranos, X-Men: The Last Stand)
- Efren Ramirez (1973–) American actor to Mexican and Salvadoran parents
- Marisa Ramirez (1977–) American actress of Mexican descent (Blue Bloods)
- Sara Ramirez (1975–) Mexican-born American actress (Grey's Anatomy)
- Luis Antonio Ramos (1973–) Puerto Rican-born American actor
- Monica Rial (1975–) American anime voice actress of Spanish descent (My Hero Academia, Dragon Ball)
- J. August Richards (1973–) American actor of Afro-Panamanian descent (Angel, Agents of S.H.I.E.L.D.)
- Lauren Ridloff (née Teruel; 1978–) American actress of Mexican and African-American descent (The Walking Dead, Eternals)
- Bianca Del Rio (1975–) American drag queen, comedian, actor, and costume designer and Cuban and Honduran descent
- James Roday (born James David Rodriguez; 1976–) American actor; father of Mexican descent (Psych, A Million Little Things)
- Adam Rodriguez (1975–) American actor. He is three-quarters Puerto Rican and one-quarter Cuban (CSI: Miami, Criminal Minds).
- Aida Rodriguez (1977–) American actress of Puerto Rican and Dominican descent
- Freddy Rodriguez (1975–) American actor of Puerto Rican descent
- Jai Rodriguez (1979–) American actor and musician of Puerto Rican and Italian descent
- Michelle Rodriguez (1978–). American actress of Puerto Rican and Dominican descent (Lost, Fast and Furious)
- Mel Rodriguez (1973–) American actor of Cuban descent (Getting On, The Last Man on Earth, On Becoming a God in Central Florida)
- Ramón Rodríguez (1979–) Puerto Rican-born New Yorker raised (The Wire, Day Break, Transformers: Revenge of the Fallen, The Taking of Pelham 123)
- Zoe Saldaña (1978–) American actress of Puerto Rican and Dominican descent
- Kiele Sanchez (1977–) American actress of partially Puerto Rican descent (The Glades)
- Marco Sanchez (1970–) American actor of Cuban descent (Walker, Texas Ranger)
- Merlin Santana (1976–2002) American of Dominican descent (The Cosby Show, Getting By, Under One Roof, The Steve Harvey Show)
- Renoly Santiago (1974–) Puerto Rican-born and raised in Union City, New Jersey
- Tessie Santiago (1975–) American actress of Cuban descent
- Jon Seda (1970–) American actor of Puerto Rican descent
- Diego Serrano (1973–) Ecuadorian-born American actor
- Hilary Swank (1974–) American actress and film producer. Her grandmother was of Mexican descent.
- Paola Turbay (1970–) American actress of Colombian descent
- Alanna Ubach (1975–). American actress of Puerto Rican and Mexican descent
- Jacob Vargas (1971–) Mexican-born American actor
- Nadine Velazquez (1978–) American actress and model of Puerto Rican descent (My Name Is Earl, The League)
- Erik Valdez (1979–) American actor to a father of Mexican, Spanish and Native American descend
- James Vasquez (1972–) American actor and director to a Mexican father
- Sofía Vergara (1972–) Colombian-born American actress
- Vanessa Villela (1978–) Mexican-born American actor
- Michael Saucedo (1970–) American actor of Mexican and Irish descent
- Liza Colón-Zayas (1972–) American actress and playwright of Puerto Rican descent

=== 1980s ===
- Jordana Brewster (1980–) Panamanian born American actress (Fast & Furious saga).
- Anabelle Acosta (1987–) Cuban-born American actress (Ballers, Quantico)
- Christina Aguilera (1980–) American singer and actress of Ecuadorian descent.
- Jessica Alba (1981–) American actress to a father of Mexican descent.
- Odette Annable (1985–) American actress of Colombian and Cuban descent (House)
- Joe Arquette (1981–) American actor of Mexican descent
- Adrienne Bailon (1983–) American singer, actress and talk show host. Her father is Ecuadorian and her mother is Puerto Rican.
- Stephanie Beatriz (1981–) Argentine-born American actress and model of Colombian and Bolivian descent (Brooklyn Nine-Nine)
- Alexis Bledel (1981–) American actress of Argentine and Mexican descent
- Richard Cabral (1984–) American actor of Mexican descent
- Jencarlos Canela (1988–) American singer, songwriter and actor of Cuban descent
- Aimee Carrero (1988–) Dominican-born American actress (Young & Hungry)
- Victoria Cartagena (1985–) American theater, film, and television actress (Manifest)
- Rafael Casal (1985–) American writer, actor, producer, and showrunner. He is of Irish, Spanish, and Cuban descent.
- David Castañeda (1989–) American actor of Mexican descent (The Umbrella Academy)
- Teresa Castillo (1983–) American actress of Spanish, Mexican, and Chinese ancestry
- Angélica Celaya (1982–) American actress of Mexican descent
- Lisseth Chavez (1989–) American actress of Salvadoran descent
- Ana Brenda Contreras (1986–) American actress of Mexican descent
- Jackie Cruz (1986–) American actress of Dominican descent (Orange Is the New Black)
- Majandra Delfino (1981–) Venezuelan-born American actress and singer.
- Aarón Díaz (1982–) Mexican-born American actor
- Alyssa Diaz (1985–) American actress of Mexican, Colombian and Irish descent (As the World Turns, The Nine Lives of Chloe King)
- Melonie Diaz (1984–) American actress of Puerto Rican descent (Charmed)
- Alejandro Edda (1984–) Mexican-American actor
- Tamara Feldman (1980–) American actress of Mexican descent
- America Ferrera (1984–) American actress, producer, and director of Honduran descent (Ugly Betty, Superstore)
- Melissa Fumero (1982–) American actress and director of Cuban descent (Brooklyn Nine-Nine, One Life to Live)
- David Gallagher (1985–) American actor of Cuban and Irish descent (7th Heaven)
- Jesse Garcia (1982–) American actor of Mexican descent
- Jessica Marie Garcia (1987–) American actress. She is of Mexican and Cuban descent (The Middle, Liv and Maddie, On My Block).
- Miguel Gomez (1985–) Colombian-born American actor
- Julie Gonzalo (1981–) Argentine-born American actress
- Meagan Good (1981–) American actress. Her paternal grandmother is of Puerto Rican descent.
- Diane Guerrero (1986–) American actress of Colombian descent
- Ryan Guzman (1987–) American actor. His father is Mexican.
- Heather Hemmens (1988–) American actress of Chilean descent
- Callie Hernandez (1988–) American actress. Her father is Mexican and her mother is Swiss-German (Blair Witch, La La Land, The Endless, Alien: Covenant).
- April Lee Hernandez (1980–) American actress of Puerto Rican descent
- Kristin Herrera (1989–) American actress of Spanish and Portuguese descent (Zoey 101, General Hospital)
- Shayne Lamas (1985–) American reality television personality and actress. She is daughter of American actor of Argentine descent Lorenzo Lamas
- William Levy (born William Levy Gutiérrez; 1980–) Cuban-born American actor
- Adrianne León (1987–) American actress of Puerto Rican and Ecuadorian descent
- Josie Loren (1987–) American actress of Cuban descent (Make It or Break It)
- Gabriel Luna (1982–) American actor of Mexican descent (Agents of S.H.I.E.L.D.)
- J. R. Martinez (1983–) American actor. His mother is of Salvadoran origin
- Natalie Martinez (1984–) American actress and model of Cuban descent
- Lindsay Mendez (1983–) American actress of Mexican and Russian Jewish descent
- Alex Meraz (1985–) American actor of Mexican descent
- Alano Miller (1980–) American actor of partial Cuban ancestry
- Christina Milian (1981–) American actress, singer and songwriter of Cuban descent
- Lin-Manuel Miranda (1980) - American actor, composer, lyricist, singer, rapper, actor, producer, and playwright, known by his roles in Broadway musicals. He is of mostly Puerto Rican descent, but he also is a quarter Mexican.
- Daniella Monet (1989–) American actress and singer of Chilean, Croatan and Italian descent
- Natalie Morales (1985–) American actress of Cuban descent (The Middleman).
- Patricia Mota (1982–) Dominican-born American actress
- Frankie Muniz (1985–) American actor to a Puerto Rican father (Malcolm in the Middle)
- Carlos Navarro (1980–) American actor and radio personality of Peruvian and Cuban descent.
- Victor Ortiz (1987–) American professional boxer and film actor of Mexican descent
- Brina Palencia (1984–) American voice actress (One Piece, Fairy Tail)
- J. D. Pardo (1980–) American actor of Argentinian and Salvadoran descent
- Sara Paxton (1988–) American actress of Mexican descent
- Carlos PenaVega (1989–) American actor and singer. His father is of Spanish and Venezuelan descent, and his mother is Dominican (Big Time Rush)
- Walter Perez (1982–) American actor of Mexican descent.
- Daniella Pineda (1987–) American actress, writer, and comedian of Mexican descent
- Aubrey Plaza (1984–) American actress of Puerto Rican and European descent
- Bridget Powers (1980–) American pornographic actress of Guatemalan descent
- Reagan Gomez-Preston (1980–) American actress of Puerto Rican and African American descent (The Parent 'Hood, The Cleveland Show)
- Francia Raisa (1988–) American actress. She is of Mexican and Honduran descent (Bring It On: All or Nothing, The Secret Life of the American Teenager and Grown-ish).
- J. R. Ramirez (1980–) Cuban-born American actor (Manifest)
- Monica Raymund (1986–) American actress to a Dominican mother (Chicago Fire).
- Nicole Richie (1981–) American actress of partial Mexican descent
- Emily Rios (1989–) American actress of Mexican descent
- Naya Rivera (1987–2020) American actress of Puerto Rican, African American and German descent (Glee)
- Elizabeth Rodriguez (1980–) American actress of Puerto Rican descent (Orange Is the New Black)
- Genesis Rodriguez (1987–) is an American actress. She is daughter of Venezuelan singer José Luis Rodríguez
- Gina Rodriguez (1984–) American actress to Puerto Rican parents (Jane the Virgin)
- Gabrielle Ruiz (1984–) American actress of Mexican descent
- Teresa Ruiz (1988–) Mexican-born American actress
- Rosa Salazar (1985–) Canadian-born American actress of Peruvian and French descent.
- Claudia Salinas (1983–) Mexican-born American actress and model
- Ray Santiago (1984–) American actor of Puerto Rican descent (Ash vs Evil Dead)
- Josh Segarra (1986–) American actor of Puerto Rican descent (The Electric Company, Sirens, and Arrow)
- Jamie-Lynn Sigler (1981–) American actress and singer of Jewish Greek-Romanian and Cuban descent (The Sopranos).
- Charise Castro Smith (1983–) actress of Cuban descent
- Tessa Thompson (1983–) American actress and singer. Her father is of Afro-Panamanian descent, while her mother is of Caucasian and Mexican ancestry (Selma, Creed, Thor: Ragnarok)
- Michael Trevino (1985–) American actor of Mexican descent (The Vampire Diaries, Roswell, New Mexico)
- Brittany Underwood (1988–) American actress and singer of English and Colombian descent (One Life to Live, Hollywood Heights)
- Wilmer Valderrama (1980–) American actor, producer, singer and television personality (That '70s Show, From Dusk till Dawn: The Series). He is of Venezuelan descent.
- Carlos Valdes (1989–) Colombian-born American actor and singer (The Flash)
- Denise Vasi (1983-) American actress and model of Puerto Rican, Dominican and Greek descent.
- Alexa Vega (1988–) American actress and singer to a Colombian father (Spy Kids)
- Christina Vidal (1981–) American actress of Puerto Rican descent (Taina)
- Ana Villafañe (1989–) American actress of Cuban and Salvadoran descent.
- Carolina Ravassa (1985–) Colombian-born American actress

=== 1990s ===
- Tyler Alvarez (1997–) American actor of Cuban and Puerto Rican descent (Every Witch Way, American Vandal)
- Moisés Arias (1994–) American actor of Colombian descent (Hannah Montana)
- Adria Arjona (1992-) American actress. She is the daughter of Guatemalan singer Ricardo Arjona and of a Puerto Rican woman.
- Jake T. Austin (1994–) American actor. His mother is of Puerto Rican, Argentine and Spanish descent (Wizards of Waverly Place)
- Monica Barbaro (1990–) American actress, born to a mother of Mexican and Nicaraguan descent (A Complete Unknown)
- Melissa Barrera (1991–) Mexican-born American actress
- Shakira Barrera (1990-) American actress to Nicaraguan parents (Marvel Cinematic Universe)
- Diego Boneta (1990–) Mexican-born American actor
- Camila Cabello (1997–) Cuban-born American actress and singer
- Sasha Calle (1995–) American actress of Colombian descent
- Jason Canela (1992–) American actor of Cuban descent
- Sofia Carson (1993–) American actress and singer of Colombian descent (Descendants)
- Isabella Castillo (1994–) Cuban-born American actress and singer
- Raquel Castro (1994–) American actress, singer and songwriter to a Puerto Rican father and a mother of Italian and Jewish descent
- David Castro (1996–) American actor. He is brother of Raquel Castro
- Nicholas Alexander Chavez (1999–) American actor of Mexican descent
- Ariana DeBose (1991-) American actress. Her father is Puerto Rican.
- Alexa Demie (1990–) American actress of Mexican descent (Euphoria)
- Rhenzy Feliz (1997-) American actor of Dominican descent.
- Eduardo Franco (1994–) American actor of Mexican descent (Stranger Things)
- Seychelle Gabriel (1991–) American actress. Her paternal grandfather is of Mexican origin (Falling Skies)
- Hunter Gomez (1991–) - American actor of Mexican descent.
- Isabella Gomez (1998–) Colombian-born American actress (One Day at a Time)
- Selena Gomez (1992–) American actress and singer of Mexican descent
- Froy Gutierrez (1998–) American actor and singer of Mexican descent
- Kathleen Herles - (1990–) American voice actress of Peruvian descent (Dora the Explorer, Go, Diego, Go!)
- Ricardo Hurtado (1999–) American actor of Nicaraguan descent (School of Rock)
- Adam Irigoyen (1997–) American actor, singer, rapper and dancer of Cuban descent
- Jharrel Jerome (1997-) American actor of Dominican and Haitian descent.
- Victoria Justice (1993–) American actress and singer. Her mother is of Puerto Rican origin (Zoey 101)
- Q'orianka Kilcher - (1990–) German-born American actress of Peruvian and German descent
- Brandon Larracuente (1994–) American actor of Puerto Rican descent (Party of Five, The Good Doctor, Bloodline)
- Stefania LaVie Owen (1997–) American actress to a Cuban mother (Running Wilde, The Carrie Diaries, Sweet Tooth)
- Demi Lovato (1992–) American actress of Nuevomexicano origin.
- Julio Macias (1990–) Mexican-born American actor.
- Ruby Modine - (1990–) American actress to a Puerto Rican mother.
- Lindsey Morgan (1990–) American actress of Mexican and Irish descent (The 100)
- Christian Navarro (1991–) American actor of Puerto Rican descent (13 Reasons Why)
- Dylan O'Brien (1991–) American actor of Spanish descent (Teen Wolf and The Maze Runner)
- Hayley Orrantia (1994–) American actress, singer, and songwriter. Her grandfather is of Mexican descent and she identifies herself as Latina.
- Alycia Pascual-Peña (1999–) American actress (Saved by the Bell).
- Chance Perdomo (1996–2024) British-American actor of Guatemalan and Dominican Republic descent
- Tyler Posey (born Tyler Garcia Posey; 1991–) American actor and musician of Mexican descent (Teen Wolf)
- Cierra Ramirez (1995–) American actress and singer of Colombian and Mexican descent (The Fosters)
- Danny Ramirez (1997–) - American actor of Colombian and Mexican descent.
- Anthony Ramos (1991–) American actor of Puerto Rican descent.
- Tony Revolori (né Quiñonez; 1996–) American actor of Guatemalan descent (Spider-Man: Homecoming and Spider-Man: Far From Home)
- Natalie Rial (1996–) American anime voice actress of Spanish descent (Call of the Night, Oshi no Ko)
- Michaela Jaé Rodriguez (1991–) American actress and Singer. One of her grandparent was Puerto Rican.
- Rico Rodriguez (1998–) American actor of Mexican descent (Modern Family)
- Caitlin Sanchez (1996–) American actress of Cuban descent
- Bianca Santos (1990–) American actress of Cuban and Brazilian descent (The Fosters)
- Christian Serratos (1990–) American actress of Mexican and Italian descent (The Walking Dead)
- Jeremy Suarez (1990-) American actor, film producer and director of Cuban and African descent (The Bernie Mac Show)
- Anya Taylor-Joy (1996-) American actress born to an Argentine father and a Zambian mother of British and Spaniard descent.
- Shannon Tavarez (1999–2010) – child actress; of African American and Dominican descent
- Julia Goldani Telles (1995–) - American-born Brazilian-raised actress and ballet dancer. She is of Mexican and Brazilian descent (The Affair)
- Bella Thorne (1997–) American actress. Her father is of Cuban origin
- Diego Tinoco (1997–) American actor of Mexican, Ecuadorian, and Colombian descent (On My Block, Knights of the Zodiac)
- Anthony De La Torre (1993–) American actor, singer, songwriter and guitarist of Cuban descent
- Makenzie Vega (1994–) American actress of Colombian and American descent. She is the sister of Alexa Vega.
- Jamila Velazquez (1995–) American singer and actress of Dominican and Puerto Rican descent
- Damian Terriquez (1998-) American Actor of Mexican descent (Glamorous)

=== 2000s ===
- Izabella Alvarez (2004–) American actress and voice artist (The Casagrandes, Shameless, Westworld, Walk the Prank)
- Cree Cicchino (2002–) American actress of Italian and Ecuadorian descent
- Michael Garza (2000–) American actor of Mexican descent (Scary Stories to Tell in the Dark)
- Madison De La Garza (2001–) American actress of Mexican descent (Desperate Housewives)
- Xochitl Gomez (born 2006) American actress of Mexican descent (Marvel Cinematic Universe)
- Anthony Gonzalez (2004–) American actor and Voice actor of Guatemalan descent (Coco).
- Lilimar Hernandez (2000–) Venezuelan-born American actress of Cuban descent
- Skai Jackson (2002–) American actress, YouTuber, and author. She is of Afro Honduran and Afro American descent (Jessie, Bunk'd)
- Xolo Maridueña (2001–) American actor of Mexican, Cuban and Ecuadorean heritage (Cobra Kai).
- Isabela Merced (2001-) American actress to a Peruvian mother.
- Isabela Moner (2001–) American actress, voice actress, singer, songwriter, dancer and ukulele player. Her mother is Peruvian.
- Jenna Ortega (2002–) American actress of Mexican and Puerto Rican descent (Jane the Virgin, Wednesday)
- Maia Reficco Argentinian-American actress and singer (b.2000)
- Rachel Zegler (2001–) American actress. Her mother is of Colombian descent.

== Year of birth unknown ==
- Seidy López - Mexican-born American actress and director
- Elena Tovar - Mexican-born American actress

== See also ==
- List of Hispanic and Latino Americans
