= Ubykh grammar =

Grammar of the Ubykh language

Ubykh was a polysynthetic language with a high degree of agglutination that had an ergative-absolutive alignment.

== Nouns ==
=== Plurality ===
Ubykh nouns do not mark plurality and the only case that displays plurality is the relational suffix -/nɜ/. Otherwise plurality is shown either by suppletive verb roots (e.g. /ɐkʷɨn blɜs/ 'he is in the car' vs. /ɐkʷɨn blɜʒʷɜ/ 'they are in the car') or by verb suffixes: /ɐkʲʼɜn/ ('he goes'), /ɐkʲʼɐn/ ('they go').

=== Definiteness ===
The definite article is /ɐ/ (e.g. /ɐtɨt/ 'the man'). There is no indefinite article directly equivalent to the English a or an, but /zɜ/-(root)-/ɡʷɜrɜ/ (literally 'one'-(root)-'certain') translates French un : e.g. /zɜnɜjnʃʷɡʷɜrɜ/ ('a certain young man').

=== Cases ===
There are two core cases and four non-core cases in Ubykh. The core cases are: relational, absolutive; the non-core cases are: adverbial, locative, instrumental, and instrumental-comitative.

Ubykh cases
| | singular | plural |
|---|---|---|
| relational | -/n/ | -/nɜ/ |
| absolutive | -/Ø/ | |
| adverbial | -/n(ɨ)/ | |
| locative | -/ʁɜ/ | |
| instrumental | -/ɜwn(ɨ)/ | |
| instrumental-comitative | -/ɐlɜ/ | |

==== Relational case ====
This case displays ergative, genitive, and dative functions. It is marked with -/n/ in the singular and -/nɨ/ in the plural and is the only case that has a distinction in plurality.

/sɨtʷ amɨzɨn jɨbjɜqʼɜ/
/sɨ-tʷ a-mɨzɨ-n Ø-jɨ-bjɜ-qʼɜ/
1stPOSS-father.ABS the-child-ERG {(s)he saw}
"My father saw the child."

==== Absolutive case ====
Marked with the bare root; this indicates the subject of an intransitive sentence and the direct object of a transitive sentence (e.g. /tɨt/ 'a man').

/sɨtʷ ɐkʲʼɜqʼɜ/
/sɨ-tʷ ɐ-kʲʼɜ-qʼɜ/
1stPOSS-father.ABS {(s)he went}
"My father went."

==== Adverbial case ====
This is marked with -/n(ɨ)/ and has the primary function of marking essive and translative functions of nouns.

==== Locative case ====
Marked in -/ʁɜ/, which is the equivalent of English in, on or at.

==== Instrumental case ====
Marked with -/ɜwn(ɨ)/ and was also treated as a case in Dumézil (1975). This is similar to "by means of" in English.

==== Instrumental-Comitative case ====
Marked with -/ɐlɜ/ and broadly means "with".

==== Other suffixes ====
There is also a pair of suffixes that have been noted to be synthetic datives but are not cases in their own right: -/lɐq/ ('to[wards]') and -/ʁɐfɜ/ ('for') e.g. /ɜχʲɨlɐq ɐstʷɜdɜw/ 'I will send it to the prince'.

== Adjectives ==
In Ubykh, adjectives do not decline in any way and are suffixed to the noun that they modify: /tʃɨbʒɨjɜ/ ('pepper') with /pɬɨ/ ('red') becomes /tʃɨbʒɨjɜpɬɨ/ ('red pepper').

== Pronouns ==
Free pronouns in all North-West Caucasian languages lack an ergative-absolutive distinction.

Free personal pronouns
| | | 1st Person | 2nd Person | | 3rd Person |
| | | 1st Person | Normal | Jocular | 3rd Person |
|---|---|---|---|---|---|
| Singular | Standard | /s(ɨ)ʁʷɜ/ | /(w(ɨ))ʁʷɜ/ | /χɜʁʷɜ/ | /ɐʁʷɜ/ |
| Singular | Ali Bilaş | /(s)χɜ/ | /(w(ɨ))ʁʷɜ/ | /χɜʁʷɜ/ | /ɐʁʷɜ/ |
| Plural | Standard | /ʃɨʁʷɜɬɜ/ | /ɕʷɨʁʷɜɬɜ/ | | /ɐʁʷɜɬɜ/ |
| Plural | Tevfik Esenç | /ʃɜɬɜ/ | /ɕʷɜɬɜ/ | | /ɐʁʷɜɬɜ/ |
| Plural | Osman Güngür | /ʃɨʁʷɜ/ | /ɕʷɨʁʷɜ/ | | /ɐʁʷɜɬɜ/ |

The "standard" pronouns are displayed along with variations that particular speakers used due to rapid speech. All speakers condemned Tevfik Esenç's usage of /ʃɜɬɜ/ and he even accepted the correction but all recordings of Tevfik contain /ʃɜɬɜ/ regardless.

=== Possessive ===
Possessive pronouns
| | 1st Person | 2nd Person | | 3rd Person |
| | 1st Person | Normal | Jocular | 3rd Person |
|---|---|---|---|---|
| Singular | /sɨ/- | /wɨ/- | /χɜ/- | /ʁɜ/- |
| Plural | /ʃɨ/- | /ɕʷɨ/- | /χɜ/- | /ɐʁɜ/- |

Possessed nouns have their plurality marked with the affix /-ɜw-/.

/ʃɜwtʃɨ/
/ʃ(ɨ)-ɜw-tʃɨ/
1pPOSS-PL-horse
Our horses

== Verbs ==
=== Verb Template ===
The Ubykh verb template is quite complex with 26 slots for the verb.

1. Interrogative / subordinative prefixes
2. absolutive agreement marker or a prefixed interrogative pronoun
3. Oblique-1 marker agreeing with slot 4
4. Relational preverb
5. Incorporated noun or Oblique-2 marker
6. Local preverb
7. /ʁɜ/- or /ɐ/-
8. Generic preverb /lɜ/
9. Orientational preverb /jɨ/-
10. Ergative preverb marker
11. Negation in the dynamic and imperfect tenses or polite imperative
12. Causative
13. stem
14. Intensifying suffix
15. Habitual aspect
16. Iterative aspect
17. Exhaustive aspect
18. Excessive aspect
19. Continual aspect
20. Potential aspect
21. Plural marker
22. Tense
23. Plural marker for dynamic past, conditional II, and stative present.
24. Negation in all tenses except for dynamic present
25. Affect marker
26. Mood or converb markers
27. Conjunctive elements

=== Agreement ===
Oblique 1 markers are limited to marking the agreement of a noun before a relational preverb and Oblique 2 markers are used for not only marking agreement with local and directional preverbs but also the simple oblique, or dative, arguments.

Pronominal Agreement Markers
| | | Absolutive | Oblique (1 and 2) | Ergative |
|---|---|---|---|---|
| First Person | sg. | /s(ɨ)/- | /s(ɨ)/- ~ /z/ | /s(ɨ)/- ~ /z/ |
| First Person | pl. | /ʃ(ɨ)/- | /ʃ(ɨ)/- ~ /ʒ/- | /ʃ(ɨ)/- ~ /ʒ/- |
| Second Person | sg. | /wɨ/- | /w(ɨ)/- | /w(ɨ)/- |
| Second Person | pl. | /ɕʷ(ɨ)/- | /ɕʷ(ɨ)/- ~ /ʑʷ(ɨ)/- | /ɕʷ(ɨ)/- ~ /ʑʷ(ɨ)/- |
| Second Person | sg. (joc., arc.) | /χɜ/- | /χɜ/- | /χɜ/- |
| Third Person | sg. | /ɐ/-, /jɨ/-, /ɨ/-, /Ø/- | /Ø/- | n(ɨ)/- /Ø/- |
| Third Person | pl. | /ɐ/-, /jɨ/-, /Ø/- | /ɐ/- | /ɐ/-, /nɐ/- |

The second-person /χɜ/- is an archaic pronoun used to indicate that the person being referred to is a female, or heckling the speaker in some way. It became extinct before the death of the language due to all of the last speakers being male.

The third person agreement markers have a fair amount of variation due to the rules it must follow.

absolutive markers
| Marker | Rule | Example |
|---|---|---|
| /ɐ/- | No other third person object is present in the sentence. | /ɐ-qʼɜ-qʼɜ/ "(s)he said" – /ɐ-z-bjɜ-n/ "I see it" |
| /jɨ/- | Appears when the following marker is also third person singular. | /jɨ-Ø-jɜ-qʼɜ/ "X hits Y" |
| /ɨ/- | This is a rare allophone of /jɨ/- and usually appears when the marker carries stress. | /ɨ́-Ø-tʷʼɜ-qʼɜ/ "X digs Y" |
| /Ø/- | This appears when the following marker is third person plural. | /Ø-ɐ́-ʃ-tʷʼɨ-n/ "we give X to them" |

The plural markers exist in the same rules as the singular rules with the exception that singular /ɐ/- can be deleted but plural /ɐ/- cannot.

=== Dynamic verb conjugation ===
Dynamic Ubykh verbs are split up in two groups: Group I which contain the simple tenses and Group II which contain derived counterpart tenses. Only the Karaclar dialect uses the progressive tense and the plural is unknown.

The singular-plural distinction is used when the subject, the ergative, is singular or plural.

Square brackets indicate elided vowels; parentheses indicate optional parts of the stem; and the colon indicates the boundary of a morpheme.

verb conjugation
Group I
| | Singular | Plural |
|---|---|---|
| Simple past | -/qʼɜ/ | -/qʼɜ-n(ɜ)/ |
| Mirative past | -/jtʼ/ | -/jɬ(ɜ)/ |
| Present | -/n/ | -/ɐ-n/ |
| Future I | -/ɜw/ | -/n[ɜ]-ɜw/ |
| Future II | -/ɜw:t/ | -/n[ɜ]-ɜw:t/ |
| (Progressive) | -/ɜwɨ:n/ | ? |
Group II
| Pluperfect | -/qʼɜ:jtʼ/ | -/qʼɜ:jɬ(ɜ)/ ~ -/qʼɜ:nɜ:jtʼ/ |
| Imperfect | -/nɜ:jtʼ/ | -/ɐ-nɜ:jɬ(ɜ)/ |
| Conditional I | -/ɜwɨ:jtʼ/ | -/n[ɜ]-ɜwɨ:jɬ(ɜ)/ |
| Conditional II | -/ɜw:tʷ:qʼɜ/ | -/(n[ɜ]-)ɜw:tʷ:qʼɜ(-n)/ |

==== Simple past ====
The verbs in the simple past tense are conjugated with -/qʼɜ/ in the singular and -/qʼɜ-n(ɜ)/ in the plural.

Examples:

- /qʼɜ/ – to say → /ɐ-qʼɜ-qʼɜ/ (s)he said
- /fɨ/ – to eat → /ɐ-fɨ-qʼɜ/ (s)he ate
- /tɕʼɜ/ – to know → /ɐ-tɕʼɜ-qʼɜ/ (s)he knew
- /kʲʼɜ/ – to go → /ɐ-kʲʼɜ-qʼɜ/ (s)he went

| Plurality | Person | Ubykh | Meaning |
|---|---|---|---|
| Singular | First-person | /s(ɨ)-fɨ-qʼɜ/ | I ate |
| Singular | Second-person | /wɨ-fɨ-qʼɜ/ | you ate |
| Singular | Third-person | /ɐ-fɨ-qʼɜ/ | (s)he ate |
| Plural | First-person | /ʃ(ɨ)-fɨ-qʼɜ-n(ɜ)/ | we ate |
| Plural | Second-person | /ɕʷ(ɨ)-fɨ-qʼɜ-n(ɜ)/ | you (all) ate |
| Plural | Third-person | /ɐ-fɨ-qʼɜ-n(ɜ)/ | they ate |

==== Mirative past ====
The verbs in the mirative past tense are conjugated with -/jtʼ/ in the singular and -/jɬ(ɜ)/ in the plural.

Examples:

- /qʼɜ/ – to say → /ɐ-qʼɜ-jtʼ/ (s)he said apparently
- /fɨ/ – to eat → /ɐ-fɨ-jtʼ/ (s)he ate apparently
- /tɕʼɜ/ – to know → /ɐ-tɕʼɜ-jtʼ/ (s)he knew apparently
- /kʲʼɜ/ – to go → /ɐ-kʲʼɜ-jtʼ/ (s)he went apparently

| Plurality | Person | Ubykh | Meaning |
|---|---|---|---|
| Singular | First-person | /s(ɨ)-fɨ-jtʼ/ | I ate apparently |
| Singular | Second-person | /wɨ-fɨ-jtʼ/ | you ate apparently |
| Singular | Third-person | /ɐ-fɨ-jtʼ/ | (s)he ate apparently |
| Plural | First-person | /ʃ(ɨ)-fɨ-jɬ(ɜ)/ | we ate apparently |
| Plural | Second-person | /ɕʷ(ɨ)-fɨ-jɬ(ɜ)/ | you (all) ate apparently |
| Plural | Third-person | /ɐ-fɨ-jɬ(ɜ)/ | they ate apparently |

==== Present ====
The verbs in the present tense are conjugated with -/n/ in the singular and -/ɐ-n/ in the plural.

Examples:

- /qʼɜ/ – to say → /ɐ-qʼɜ-n/ (s)he says
- /fɨ/ – to eat → /ɐ-fɨ-n/ (s)he eats
- /tɕʼɜ/ – to know → /ɐ-tɕʼɜ-n/ (s)he knows
- /kʲʼɜ/ – to go → /ɐ-kʲʼɜ-n/ (s)he goes

| Plurality | Person | Ubykh | Meaning |
|---|---|---|---|
| Singular | First-person | /s(ɨ)-fɨ-n/ | I eat |
| Singular | Second-person | /wɨ-fɨ-n/ | you eat |
| Singular | Third-person | /ɐ-fɨ-n/ | (s)he eats |
| Plural | First-person | /ʃ(ɨ)-f-ɐ-n/ | we eat |
| Plural | Second-person | /ɕʷ(ɨ)-f-ɐ-n/ | you (all) eat |
| Plural | Third-person | /ɐ-f-ɐ-n/ | they eat |

==== Future I ====
The verbs in the future I tense are conjugated with -/ɜw/ in the singular and -/n[ɜ]-ɜw/ in the plural. It conveys a sense of certainty, immediacy, obligation, or intentionality.

Examples:

- /qʼɜ/ – to say → /ɐ-qʼ-ɜw/ (s)he certainly will say
- /fɨ/ – to eat → /ɐ-f-ɜw/ (s)he certainly will eat
- /tɕʼɜ/ – to know → /ɐ-tɕʼ-ɜw/ (s)he certainly will know
- /kʲʼɜ/ – to go → /ɐ-kʲʼ-ɜw/ (s)he certainly will go

| Plurality | Person | Ubykh | Meaning |
|---|---|---|---|
| Singular | First-person | /s(ɨ)-f-ɜw/ | I certainly will eat |
| Singular | Second-person | /wɨ-f-ɜw/ | you certainly will eat |
| Singular | Third-person | /ɐ-f-ɜw/ | (s)he certainly will eat |
| Plural | First-person | /ʃ(ɨ)-fɨ-n[ɜ]-ɜw/ | we certainly will eat |
| Plural | Second-person | /ɕʷ(ɨ)-fɨ-n[ɜ]-ɜw/ | you (all) certainly will eat |
| Plural | Third-person | /ɐ-fɨ-n[ɜ]-ɜw/ | they certainly will eat |

==== Future II ====
The verbs in the future II tense are conjugated with -/ɜw:t/ in the singular and -/n[ɜ]-ɜw:t/ in the plural. It conveys a generic sense of the future as well as an exhortative sense such as: /ʃɨ-kʲʼɜ-n[ɜ]-ɜw/ (let's go!).

Examples:

- /qʼɜ/ – to say → /ɐ-qʼ-ɜw:t/ (s)he will say
- /fɨ/ – to eat → /ɐ-f-ɜw:t/ (s)he will eat
- /tɕʼɜ/ – to know → /ɐ-tɕʼ-ɜw:t/ (s)he will know
- /kʲʼɜ/ – to go → /ɐ-kʲʼ-ɜw:t/ (s)he will go

| Plurality | Person | Ubykh | Meaning |
|---|---|---|---|
| Singular | First-person | /s(ɨ)-f-ɜw:t/ | I will eat |
| Singular | Second-person | /wɨ-f-ɜw:t/ | you will eat |
| Singular | Third-person | /ɐ-f-ɜw:t/ | (s)he will eat |
| Plural | First-person | /ʃ(ɨ)-fɨ-n[ɜ]-ɜw:t/ | we will eat |
| Plural | Second-person | /ɕʷ(ɨ)-fɨ-n[ɜ]-ɜw:t/ | you (all) will eat |
| Plural | Third-person | /ɐ-fɨ-n[ɜ]-ɜw:t/ | they will eat |

==== Pluperfect ====
The verbs in the pluperfect tense are conjugated with -/ɜw/ in the singular and -/n[ɜ]-ɜw/ in the plural. It conveys [TODO]

Examples:

- /qʼɜ/ – to say → /ɐ-qʼɜ-qʼɜ:jtʼ/ (s)he had said
- /fɨ/ – to eat → /ɐ-f-qʼɜ:jtʼ/ (s)he had eaten
- /tɕʼɜ/ – to know → /ɐ-tɕʼɜ-qʼɜ:jtʼ/ (s)he had known
- /kʲʼɜ/ – to go → /ɐ-kʲʼɜ-qʼɜ:jtʼ/ (s)he had gone

| Plurality | Person | Ubykh | Meaning |
|---|---|---|---|
| Singular | First-person | /s(ɨ)-fɨ-qʼɜ:jtʼ/ | I had eaten |
| Singular | Second-person | /wɨ-fɨ-qʼɜ:jtʼ/ | you had eaten |
| Singular | Third-person | /ɐ-fɨ-qʼɜ:jtʼ/ | (s)he had eaten |
| Plural | First-person | /ʃ(ɨ)-fɨ-qʼɜ:jɬ(ɜ)/ | we had eaten |
| Plural | Second-person | /ɕʷ(ɨ)-fɨ-qʼɜ:jɬ(ɜ)/ | you (all) had eaten |
| Plural | Third-person | /ɐ-fɨ-qʼɜ:jɬ(ɜ)/ | they had eaten |

==== Imperfect ====
The verbs in the imperfect tense are conjugated with -/nɜ:jtʼ/ in the singular and either -/ɐ-nɜ:jɬ(ɜ)/ in the plural. It conveys a sense of

Examples:

- /qʼɜ/ – to say → /ɐ-qʼ-nɜ:jtʼ/ (s)he was saying, (s)he used to say
- /fɨ/ – to eat → /ɐ-f-nɜ:jtʼ/ (s)he was eating, (s)he used to eatk
- /tɕʼɜ/ – to know → /ɐ-tɕʼ-nɜ:jtʼ/ (s)he was knowing, (s)he used to know
- /kʲʼɜ/ – to go → /ɐ-kʲʼ-nɜ:jtʼ/ (s)he was going, (s)he used to go

| Plurality | Person | Ubykh | Meaning |
|---|---|---|---|
| Singular | First-person | /s(ɨ)-fɨ-nɜ:jtʼ/ | I was eating, I used to eat |
| Singular | Second-person | /wɨ-fɨ-nɜ:jtʼ/ | you were eating, you used to eat |
| Singular | Third-person | /ɐ-fɨ-nɜ:jtʼ/ | (s)he was eating, (s)he used to eat |
| Plural | First-person | /ʃ(ɨ)-f-ɐ-nɜ:jɬ(ɜ)/ | we were eating, we used to eat |
| Plural | Second-person | /ɕʷ(ɨ)-f-ɐ-nɜ:jɬ(ɜ)/ | you (all) were eating, you (all) used to eat |
| Plural | Third-person | /ɐ-f-ɐ-nɜ:jɬ(ɜ)/ | they were eating, they used to eat |

==== Conditional I ====
The verbs in the conditional I tense are conjugated with -/ɜwɨ:jtʼ/ in the singular and -/n[ɜ]-ɜwɨ:jɬ(ɜ)/ in the plural. It conveys a sense of uncertainty but also a kind of future-in-the-past if the situation had been reversed.

Examples:

- /qʼɜ/ – to say → /ɐ-qʼ-ɜwɨ:jtʼ/ (s)he would have said
- /fɨ/ – to eat → /ɐ-f-ɜwɨ:jtʼ/ (s)he would have eaten
- /tɕʼɜ/ – to know → /ɐ-tɕʼ-ɜwɨ:jtʼ/ (s)he would have known
- /kʲʼɜ/ – to go → /ɐ-kʲʼ-ɜwɨ:jtʼ/ (s)he would have gone

| Plurality | Person | Ubykh | Meaning |
|---|---|---|---|
| Singular | First-person | /s(ɨ)-fɨ-ɜwɨ:jtʼ/ | I would have eaten |
| Singular | Second-person | /wɨ-fɨ-n[ɜ]-ɜwɨ:jtʼ/ | you would have eaten |
| Singular | Third-person | /ɐ-fɨ-n[ɜ]-ɜwɨ:jtʼ/ | (s)he would have eaten |
| Plural | First-person | /ʃ(ɨ)-fɨ-n[ɜ]-ɜwɨ:jɬ(ɜ)/ | we would have eaten |
| Plural | Second-person | /ɕʷ(ɨ)-fɨ-n[ɜ]-ɜwɨ:jɬ(ɜ)/ | you (all) would have eaten |
| Plural | Third-person | /ɐ-fɨ-n[ɜ]-ɜwɨ:jɬ(ɜ)/ | they would have eaten |

==== Conditional II ====
The verbs in the conditional II tense are conjugated with -/ɜw:tʷ:qʼɜ/ in the singular and -/(n[ɜ]-)ɜw:tʷ:qʼɜ(-n)/ in the plural. It conveys a sense of certainty and intention but also a kind of future-in-the-past if the situation had been reversed.

Examples:

- /qʼɜ/ – to say → /ɐ-qʼ-ɜw:tʷ:qʼɜ/ (s)he was going to say
- /fɨ/ – to eat → /ɐ-f-ɜw:tʷ:qʼɜ/ (s)he was going to eat
- /tɕʼɜ/ – to know → /ɐ-tɕʼ-ɜw:tʷ:qʼɜ/ (s)he was going to know
- /kʲʼɜ/ – to go → /ɐ-kʲʼ-ɜw:tʷ:qʼɜ/ (s)he was going to go

| Plurality | Person | Ubykh | Meaning |
|---|---|---|---|
| Singular | First-person | /s(ɨ)-fɨ-ɜw:tʷ:qʼɜ/ | I was going to eat |
| Singular | Second-person | /wɨ-fɨ-ɜw:tʷ:qʼɜ/ | you were going to eat |
| Singular | Third-person | /ɐ-fɨ-ɜw:tʷ:qʼɜ/ | (s)he was going to eat |
| Plural | First-person | /ʃ(ɨ)-fɨ-(n[ɜ]-)ɜw:tʷ:qʼɜ(-n)/ | we were going to eat |
| Plural | Second-person | /ɕʷ(ɨ)-fɨ-(n[ɜ]-)ɜw:tʷ:qʼɜ(-n)/ | you (all) were going to eat |
| Plural | Third-person | /ɐ-fɨ-(n[ɜ]-)ɜw:tʷ:qʼɜ(-n)/ | they were going to eat |

=== Static verb conjugation ===
In all dialects and speakers, only two static tenses exist: present and past.

| | Singular | Plural |
|---|---|---|
| Present | -/Ø/ | -/n(ɜ)/ |
| Past | -/jtʼ/ | -/jɬ(ɜ)/ |

=== Aspect ===
There are five basic aspects that exist besides the aspects that exist within the Ubykh tense system. They are: habitual, iterative, exhaustive, excessive, and potential.

A few meanings covered in English by adverbs or auxiliary verbs are given in Ubykh by verb suffixes.

A speaker may combine one of these aspects with another to convey more complex aspects in conjunction with the tenses.

| Aspect | Suffix | Example with /fɨ/ ('to eat') | | Example with /dʑʷɜ/ ('to drink') | |
| Aspect | Suffix | Ubykh | English | Ubykh | English |
|---|---|---|---|---|---|
| habitual | -/gʲɜ/ | /ɐsfɨɡʲɜn/ | I eat it all the time | /ɐzdʑʷɜɡʲɜn/ | I drink it all the time |
| iterative | -/ɐj(ɨ)/ | /ɐsfɐjɨn/ | I eat it again | /ɐzdʑʷɐjɨn/ | I drink it again |
| exhaustive | -/lɜ/ | /ɐsfɨlɜn/ | I am eating it all up | /ɐzdʑʷɜlɜn/ | I am drinking it all up |
| excessive | -/tɕʷɜ/ | /ɐsfɨtɕʷɜn/ | I eat it too much | /ɐzdʑʷɜtɕʷɜn/ | I drink it too much |
| potential | -/fɜ/ | /ɐsfɨfɜn/ | I can eat it | /ɐzdʑʷɜfɜn/ | I can drink it |

example of Ubykh verbal aspects
| | | simple | habitual | iterative | exhaustive | excessive | potential |
|---|---|---|---|---|---|---|---|
| Singular | First-person | /s(ɨ)-fɨ-n/ | /s(ɨ)-fɨ-gʲɜ-n/ | /s(ɨ)-f-ɐj(ɨ)-n/ | /s(ɨ)-fɨ-lɜ-n/ | /s(ɨ)-fɨ-tɕʷɜ-n/ | /s(ɨ)-fɨ-fɜ-n/ |
| Singular | Second-person | /wɨ-fɨ-n/ | /wɨ-fɨ-gʲɜ-n/ | /wɨ-f-ɐj(ɨ)-n/ | /wɨ-fɨ-lɜ-n/ | /wɨ-fɨ-tɕʷɜ-n/ | /wɨ-fɨ-fɜ-n/ |
| Singular | Third-person | /ɐ-fɨ-n/ | /ɐ-fɨ-gʲɜ-n/ | /ɐ-f-ɐj(ɨ)-n/ | /ɐ-fɨ-lɜ-n/ | /ɐ-fɨ-tɕʷɜ-n/ | /ɐ-fɨ-fɜ-n/ |
| Plural | First-person | /ʃ(ɨ)-f-ɐ-n/ | /ʃ(ɨ)-f-gʲ[ɜ]-ɐ-n/ | /ʃ(ɨ)-f-ɐj(ɨ)-ɐ-n/ | /ʃ(ɨ)-fɨ-l[ɜ]-ɐ-n/ | /ʃ(ɨ)-fɨ-tɕʷ[ɜ]-ɐ-n/ | /ʃ(ɨ)-fɨ-f[ɜ]-ɐ-n/ |
| Plural | Second-person | /ɕʷ(ɨ)-f-ɐ-n/ | /ɕʷ(ɨ)-fɨ-gʲ[ɜ]-ɐ-n/ | /ɕʷ(ɨ)-f-ɐj(ɨ)-ɐ-n/ | /ɕʷ(ɨ)-fɨ-l[ɜ]-ɐ-n/ | /ɕʷ(ɨ)-fɨ-tɕʷ[ɜ]-ɐ-n/ | /ɕʷ(ɨ)-fɨ-f[ɜ]-ɐ-n/ |
| Plural | Third-person | /ɐ-f-ɐ-n/ | /ɐ-fɨ-gʲ[ɜ]-ɐ-n/ | /ɐ-f-ɐj(ɨ)-ɐ-n/ | /ɐ-fɨ-l[ɜ]-ɐ-n/ | /ɐ-fɨ-tɕʷ[ɜ]-ɐ-n/ | /ɐ-fɨ-f[ɜ]-ɐ-n/ |

=== Mood ===
There are eleven distinct moods in Ubykh: indicative; direct, polite, and emphatic imperative; potential and frustrative optative; irrealis and realis conditional; binary and complex interrogative.

==== Indicative ====
There is no marker for the indicative mood.

==== Imperative moods ====
There are two forms of the imperative: a formal, more polite imperative and a direct, curt imperative.

===== Direct =====
The direct imperative is usually the omission of the singular tense marker:

/wɨkʲʼɜ/
/wɨ-kʲʼɜ/
2sABS-go
"Go!" (sg.)

Versus in the plural:

/ɕʷɨkʲʼɜn/
/ɕʷɨ-kʲʼɜ-n/
2pABS-go-PL
"Go!" (pl.)

===== Polite =====
This is formed by adding a -/ɨ/ suffix to the verb root. This, however, is sometimes omitted.

===== Emphatic =====
This is formed by adding -/mɜɕ/ to the end of an imperative verb.

==== Optative moods ====
There are two forms of optative present: potential and frustrative optative.

===== Potential =====
This is formed by adding a -/χ/ suffix to the verb root or /ɐχ/ after a final /ɨ/.

===== Frustrative =====
This is formed by adding a -/dɐχ/ or -/dɜχ/.

==== Conditional moods ====
There are realis and irrealis conditionals.

===== Realis =====
This is marked with -/dɜ(n)/.

===== Irrealis =====
This is marked with -/bɜ/.

==== Interrogative moods ====
Open questions are marked with -/ɕ/ and closed questions are marked with -/j/.

=== Copulas of Existence ===
| Singular | | Plural | | Meaning |
| static | dynamic | static | dynamic | Meaning |
|---|---|---|---|---|
| /sɨ/ | /w(ɨ)s/ | /ʒʷɜ/ | /kʲʼɜʒʷɜ/ | to be in a sitting position; to be (of smaller objects) |
| /tʷɨ/ | /w(ɨ)tʷ/ | /xɜ/ | /wɨxɜ/ or /kʲʼɜxɜ/ | to be in a standing position; to be (of larger objects) |
| /ʁɨ/ | /wʁʷɜ/ | /ʁʲɜ/ | | to be suspended, to be handing |
| /ɬɨ/ | /wɨɬ/ | /ɬɜ/ | /kʲʼɜɬɜ/ | to be lying |

=== Converbs ===
Ubykh has a liberal usage of converbs to convey complex sentences.

| Converb | Meaning |
|---|---|
| /ɡʲɨ/ ~ /j(ɨ)/ | Momentary action with the primary verb. |
| /ɕɜ/ | Ongoing or continuing action with the primary verb. |
| /msɜ/ | Similar to /ɕɜ/ but implies that the verb is continuing or prolonged in nature. |
| /ɡʲɨmsɜ/ ~ /j(ɨ)msɜ/ | Instrumental-like connotations such as 'by means of'. |
| /ʃɜ/ | Exclusively used with /ʁʷɜ/ ('to want') to mark that the verb is what is wanted. |
| /n(ɨ)/ ~ /n(ɜʁʷɜdɜ(n)/ | Similar to the absolutive marker and has a sense of "X and then Y". Verbs are usually not marked with a tense when this is used. |
| /mɜ/ | Forms a conditional or slight imperative force. Usually accompanies with Future I and Future II tenses. |
| /tɐlɜ/ | Always accompanies Future I. Extremely rare so its nuance isn't known. |
| /ɐdʷɜn/ | Has a sense of goal and implies that the verb it marks is required but the task was unfulfilled and has been completed. |
