= Vera Michelena =

American actress

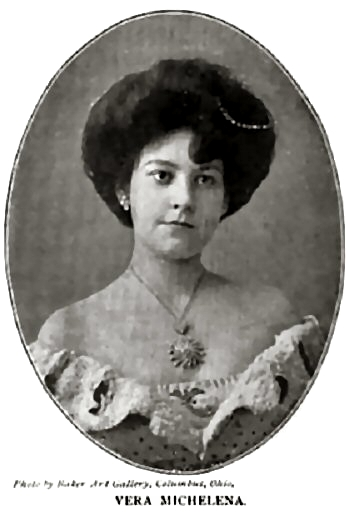
- Vera Michelena c. 1904
- Born: June 16, 1885; New York, New York
- Died: August 28, 1961 (aged 76); Queens, New York
- Occupations: Actor, singer and dancer
- Spouses: Paul Schindler (divorced 1917); Harry Spingler (m. 1918; div. 1921) Fred Hillebrand (m. 1922)
- Relatives: Beatriz Michelena (sister); Donna Barrell (half-sister)

Vera Michelena (June 16, 1885 – August 28, 1961) was an American actress, contralto prima donna and dancer who appeared in light opera, musical comedy, vaudeville and silent film. She was perhaps best remembered for her starring roles in the musicals The Princess Chic, Flo Flo and The Waltz Dream, her rendition of the vampire dance in the musical Take It from Me and as a Ziegfeld Follies performer.

== Early life ==
Vera was born in New York City, the daughter of Fernando Michelena (1858–1921), a noted Venezuelan lyric tenor, and Frances Lenord (1867–1912), an operatic soprano and pianist. Her father was the son of Spanish parents who settled in Caracas, Venezuela, where he was born. Over much of her childhood, Michelena's parents toured with the Emma Abbott Grand Opera Company. As did her sister Beatriz Michelena, a famous actress during the silent film era, Vera received her musical education from her father. Her half-sister, Teresa Michelena, was also an actress known as Donna Borrell. Vera Michelena attended school at a convent in San Miguel, California.

Both Vera and Beatriz were trained by their father in classical voice and drama studies, and they followed in his footsteps by beginning singing careers of their own. By mid-1904, with Vera busy pursuing her career in New York, Fernando Michelena settled in San Francisco, California to teach voice. There, he raised Beatriz and continued to train her, a soprano, in operatic vocal techniques. He passed his stage experience to his daughter: the way to move as another person, the way to make simple but authoritative gestures, and the way to build intensity over the span of a performance. Her father in later life taught music and worked as a vocal coach, and at the time of his death, was serving as president of Arrillaga Musical College, San Francisco. Maria Antonia Field, a Californian writer, would later chronicle her time as a student of Michelena's father in her book, Five Years of Vocal Study under Fernando Michelena.

== Theatre ==
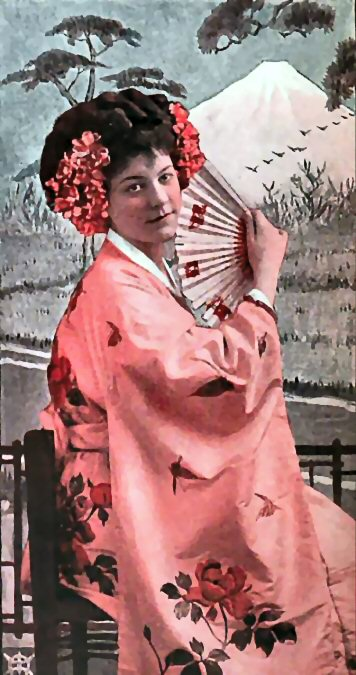
Vera Michelena in Funabashi, 1908

Michelena made her professional theatrical debut in the fall of 1902 playing a minor role in a national tour of the Kirke La Shelle comic opera, The Princess Chic. On January 19, 1903, at the Columbia Theatre, San Francisco, she assumed the title role, The Princess Chic of Normandy, and continued in this capacity for the remainder of the season and throughout the next. During the 1904–05 season, Michelena starred as Zaidee in the Harry B. Smith musical comedy, The Jewel of Asia. She spent the following season in two road productions: The School Girl, an Edwardian musical comedy by Henry Hamilton, Paul Meredith Potter and Charles H. Taylor in which she played Lillian Leigh, and The Yankee Consul, a musical comedy by Alfred George Robyn and Henry Blossom in which she played the role of Bonita.

Michelena made her New York debut in August 1906 at the Majestic Theatre, playing Princess Cholulu in the R.H. Burnside and Gustave Kerker musical comedy The Tourist. At the time, Michelena's popular rendition of the play's song "They Lived to Be Loved in Vain" drew special mention from a New York Times reviewer. Early in 1907 she appeared in Boston and Philadelphia as Ariella in The Snow Man. a musical comedy by Reginald De Koven and Hugh Stanislaus Stange that found little success when it opened on Broadway in November 1907 under the title The Girls of Holland.

On January 13, 1908, Michelena opened at the Casino Theatre in Funabashi, a musical comedy by Irvin S. Cobb and Safford Water that was inspired by a recent trip to Asia by the then American Secretary of War William H. Taft. Shortly after Funabashi closed in early February after 32 performances, Michelena replaced Magda Dahl as Princess Helena in the operetta The Waltz Dream. Adapted for the English stage by Joseph W. Herbert from the original Viennese production by Felix Dörmann and Leopold Jacobson, The Waltz Dream was staged at the old Broadway Theatre on West 41st Street and closed on May 2, 1908, after 111 performances.

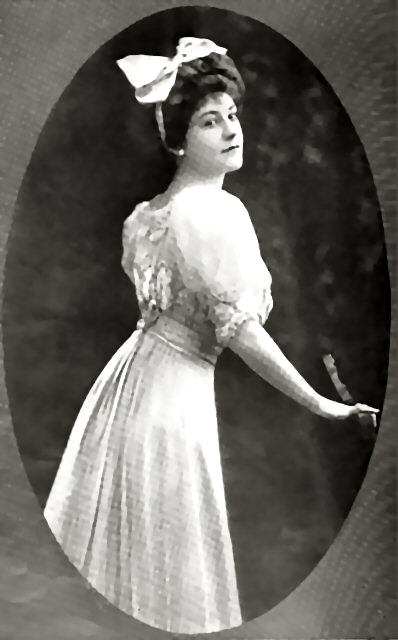
Vera Michelena, who was assigned to the role of the princess in A Waltz Dream shortly after the New York opening, Munsey Magazine, April 1908

On June 11, 1908, Michelena sailed for England aboard the steamship Blücher for an engagement at London's Palace Theatre and a later side trip to France. She returned early that September after enduring a storm-plagued Atlantic crossing aboard the ocean liner New York, to prepare for a fall road tour with the Harry B. Smith and Maurice Lévy (music) hit Broadway musical comedy, The Soul Kiss In the spring of 1910, Michelena played to record-breaking audiences at Chicago's LaSalle Theatre in the Mortimer Henry Singer farce musical The Flirting Princess. In the play, she first performed The Vampire Dance with the dancer Joseph Smith, whose choreography drew its inspiration from the works of Philip Burne-Jones and Rudyard Kipling.

On September 4, 1910, she appeared at the Grand Theatre, Chicago, in George Broadhurst's musical comedy, The Girl and the Drummer. The next month at New York's Globe Theatre, she shared top billing with Sallie Fisher and Frank Daniels in The Girl on the Train, a musical comedy by Harry B. Smith from the original by Viktor Léon and Leo Fall. Michelena remained with the musical until it closed out its run at Boston's Colonial Theatre late in April 1911. On November 2, 1911, Michelena starred in Alma, Where Do You Live?, the first production to play at the newly remodeled Bucklen Theatre in Elkhart, Indiana. Alma, Where Do You Live? by George V. Hobart and Jean Briquet had been one of the more popular Broadway musicals over the 1910–11 season. Michelena remained with Alma into the spring of 1912, and then she toured with Lew Fields' popular vaudeville extravaganza Hanky Panky.

Michelena was among the principal performers with the Ziegfeld Follies of 1914 during the musical revue's June to September run at the New Amsterdam Theatre, New York. She played the title role in the Fred de Gresac and Silvio Hein 1917–18 hit musical comedy, Flo-Flo, over a six-month run at Broadway's Cort Theatre. In the spring of 1919, she appeared at the 44th Street Theatre for a run of almost 100 performances of Take It from Me, a musical comedy by Will R. Anderson and Will B. Johnstone. In the play, she played Queenie LaBelle, a cinema vampire, who in one popular scene performs "The Vampire Dance" with Vernon "Soup" Van Dyke (Fred Hildebrand). That November at Boston's Shubert Theatre, she began an eight-week run in the title role of Betty Be Good, a musical comedy from Harry B. Smith and Hugo Riesenfeld. Michelena's last major Broadway appearance was as a principal performer with the Ziegfeld Follies of 1921.

Michelena began the 1922 fall season starring opposite Fred Hillebrand in a vaudeville musical revue called Hello Miss Radio and in 1924 they toured together in a vaudeville skit entitled All for Vera. In 1927, the two shared top billing touring in Listen Dearie, a musical comedy by Harold Atteridge and Gertrude Purcell.

== Film ==
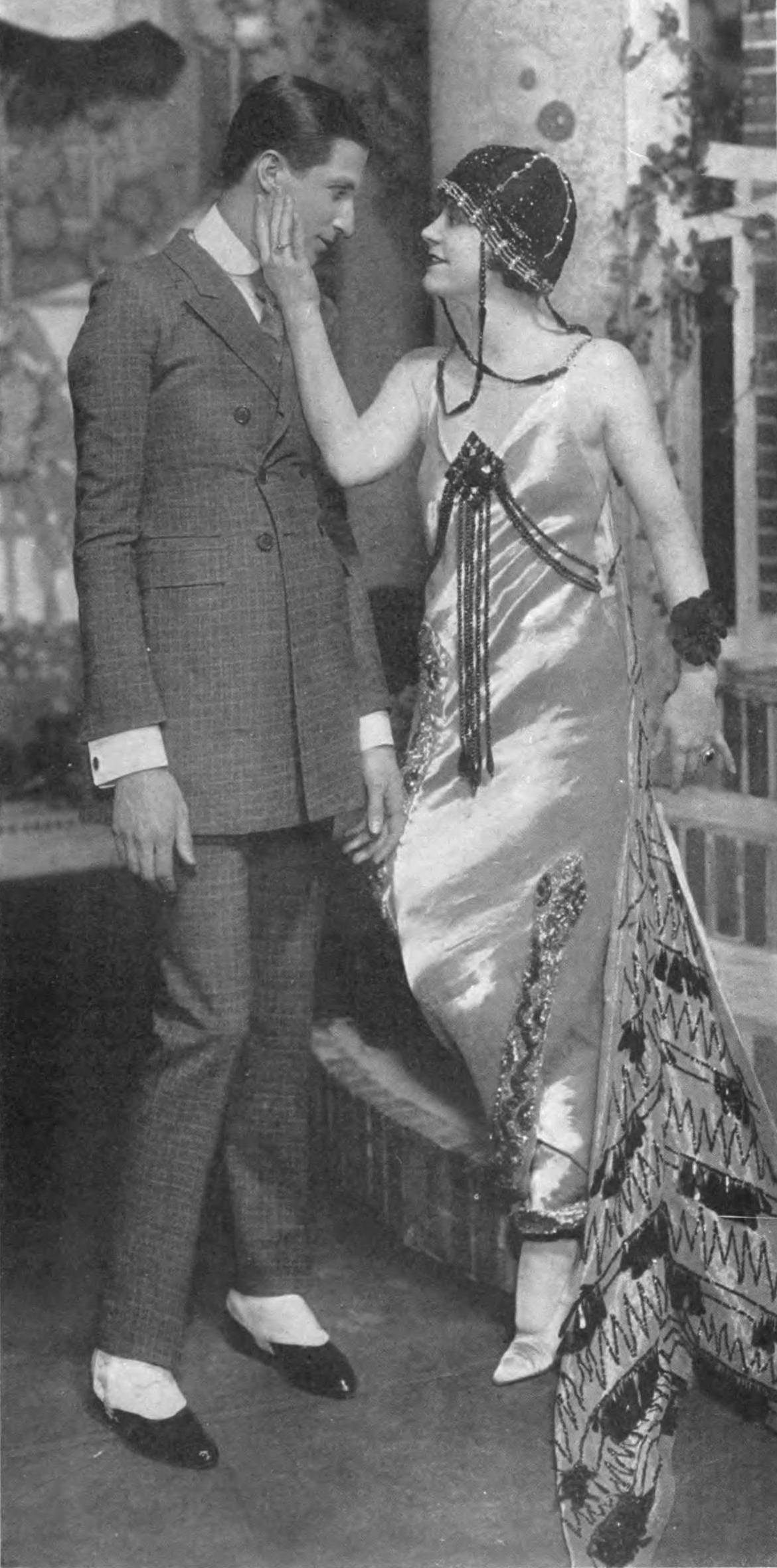
Vera Michelena with Fred Hillebrand in Take It from Me, c. 1919

She starred in at least two silent films, both opposite her then husband Harry Spingler. Michelena played Helen Warner in Driftwood, a family drama produced in March 1916 by the Ocean Film Corporation. The film was adapted from the 1911 Owen Davis play by Anthony Paul Kelly and directed by Marshall Farnum, brother of Dustin Farnum. Michelena next appeared in The Devil's Playground, a social drama produced by Monmouth Films in 1917. The Devil's Playground was directed by Harry McRae Webster, who also shared the writing credits with Dallas Tyler.

== Personal life ==
Michelena first married Paul Schindler, a composer and orchestra director who composed music for such shows as Tiger Lilly, The Geezer of Geck, The Wizard of Oz and The Isle of Spice. Michelena divorced Schindler on May 16, 1917, over alleged statutory offences. On April 30, 1918, she married stage and film actor Harry Spingler in a ceremony held in Queens, New York. This union ended after Michelena sued for divorce in Los Angeles in February 1921 on the grounds of desertion. On August 12, 1922, in Manhattan, Michelena married Fred Hillebrand, her leading man over much of her latter career. They remained together until Michelena's death in 1961 at their residence in Queens, New York.

== See also ==
- Myrtle Gonzalez
- List of Hispanic and Latino American actors
