= María de Baratta =

Salvadoran ethnomusicologist and composer (1890–1978)

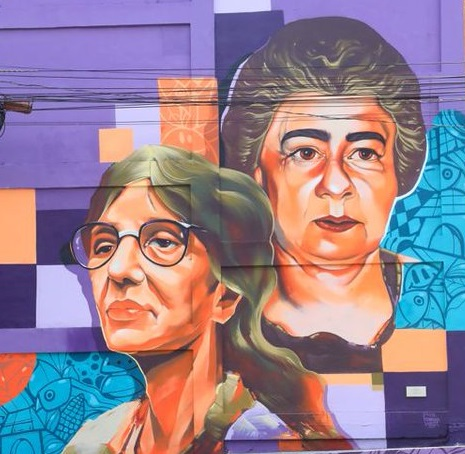
- Mural dedicated to Baratta (right) and Alcira Alonso (left)
- Born: María Mendoza García; 27 February 1890; San Salvador, El Salvador
- Died: 10 June 1978 (aged 88); San Salvador, El Salvador
- Education: Conservatorio de Música de El Salvador; Bologna Conservatory; Arrillaga Musical College
- Occupations: Ethnomusicologist; composer; pianist; folklorist
- Spouse: Augusto César Baratta del Vecchio (m. 1916; died 1971)
- Children: 3
- Musical career
- Also known as: Yara Maya

María Mendoza de Baratta (27 February 1890 – 10 June 1978), also known by the pseudonym Yara Maya, was a Salvadoran ethnomusicologist, composer, pianist, folklorist and advocate for the preservation of Indigenous heritage. Baratta published the first ethnomusicological study of indigenous music of El Salvador.

== Early life and education ==
Baratta was born María Mendoza García on 27 February 1890 in San Salvador to José Ángel Mendoza, a physician and lecturer at the University of El Salvador, and María García de Mendoza, a classically trained pianist.

Baratta first studied piano with her mother and, from the age of six, solfège with Agustín Solórzano. Enrolling at the Conservatorio de Música de El Salvador, Baratta studied under Maria Zimmerman and Antonio Gianoli. Baratta continued her studies in Italy at the Bologna Conservatory, and in the United States at Arrillaga Musical College under Vicente de Arrillaga.

== Career ==
Between 1926 and 1938 Baratta engaged in an active performing career; she also represented the country at various folkloric congresses. During her career she was a member of the Athenaeum of El Salvador, the Salvadoran Academy of History, and the Union of American Women. In 1962 she was elected a Woman of the Americas. She composed a handful of works during her career, only a few of which were published; they include the ballet El Teocalli, Canto al Sol, Ofrenda de la Elegida, Los Tecomatillos, Nahualismo, Procesión Hierática, Danza del Incienso, and El Cancionero de la jarra verde.

In 1951, Baratta published Cuzcatlán típico the first ethnomusicological study of indigenous music of El Salvador. The two volume includes transcriptions of the music traditions of the Poqomam, Pipil and Lenca peoples.

== Personal life ==
In 1916, Baratta married Augusto César Baratta del Vecchio, an Italian architect. The couple had three children.

On 10 June 1978 Baratta died in San Salvador, aged 88.

== Publications ==
- Baratta, María de (1951). Cuzcatlán típico: ensayo sobre etnofonía de El Salvador : folklore, folkwisa y folkway. Primera parte. San Salvador: Publicaciones del Ministerio de Cultura.
- Baratta, María de (1951). Cuzcatlán típico: ensayo sobre etnofonía de El Salvador : folklore, folkwisa y folkway. Segunda parte. San Salvador: Publicaciones del Ministerio de Cultura.
