= Arrillaga Musical College =

Former American music college (1887–1940s)

- Type: Music college
- Active: 1877–1940s
- Founder: Santiago Arrillaga
- Location: 2315 Jackson Street, San Francisco, California, United States; 37.79254°N 122.43328°W

Arrillaga Musical College was an American music college in San Francisco. Established in the 1877 by Santiago Arrillaga, Arrillaga Musical College remained in operation until the 1940s.

== History ==
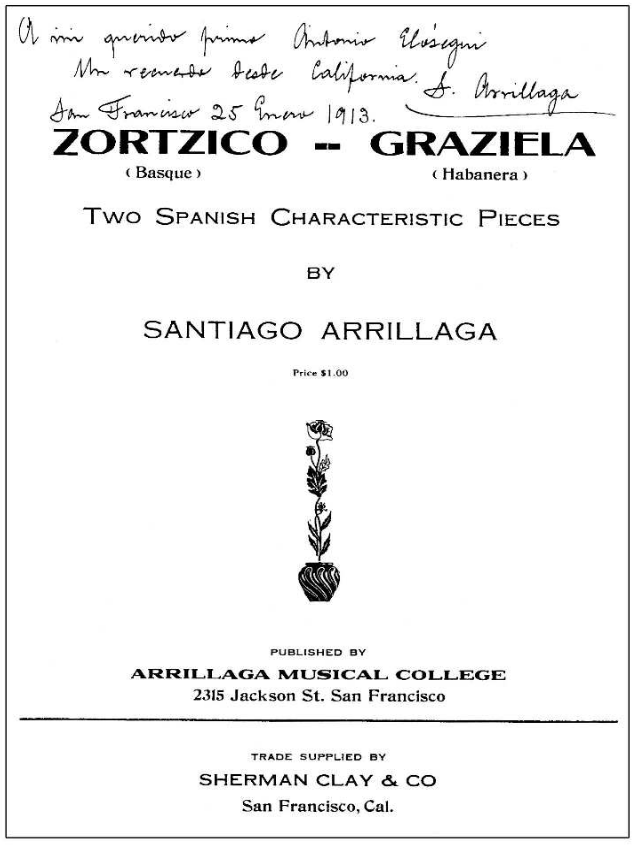
Music by Santiago Arrillaga (1912) published by Arrillaga Musical College

Arrillaga Musical College was founded in 1877 by Santiago Arrillaga (1847–1915), a Basque pianist and composer. Based at 2315 Jackson Street, the college later expanded across Jackson and Fillmore Street. In 1911, the college was incorporated by Santiago Arrillaga and his son Vincent de Arrillaga (1879–1958), an organist and music teacher.

A recital hall with a Johnson organ was installed in 1914. Following Arrillage's death in 1915, the dictatorship of the college was passed to Vincent de Arrillaga. Fernando Michelena (1858–1921), a Venezuelan born tenor and the father of Vera Michelena and Beatriz Michelena, served as the college's president.

Between 1924 and 1925, a second organ was installed. The Great Depression caused the college financially hardship, and was the administration of the college was eventually taken over by the Works Progress Administration. During this period Vincent Arrillaga remained as the college's nominal director. The College was subsequently liquidated during the 1940s.

== Notable alumni ==
- María de Baratta, Salvadoran composer, pianist, musicologist, and folklorist

== Notable faculty ==
- Adolph Rosenbecker, conductor and violinist
- Howard E. Couper, academic of music literature
