= Augusto César Baratta del Vecchio =

Italian architect active in San Salvador (1887–1971)

Augusto César Baratta del Vecchio (8 August 1887 – 1971) was an Italian architect active in El Salvador.

== Biography ==
Baratta was born on 8 August 1887 (Note: Also cited as 1882.) in Carrara, Kingdom of Italy (present-day Italy) to Ferdinando Baratta and Anna Elisa del Vecchio. Baratta studied architecture, decoration, and ornamental drawing at the Accademia Carrara, graduating in 1910.

In 1910, the Mexican architect Guillermo Heredia arrived in Carrara in order to purchase and seek advice on the installation of Carrara marble for the Benito Juárez Hemicycle. Heredia offered Baratta work as a drafter, and Baratta subsequently arrived in Mexico. Following the outbreak of the Mexican Revolution, Baratta relocated to Guatemala. In 1913, Baratta was invited to El Salvador by President Manuel Enrique Araujo, and was tasked by the government to design and build educational buildings, homes and churches. Baratta later earned a reputation as a good builder due to the minimal damage his buildings suffered during the 1917 San Salvador earthquake.

Baratta was awarded the Order of St. Sylvester for his work designing and building churches.

== Personal life ==
In 1916, Baratta married the Salvadoran ethnomusicologist and composer María de Baratta. The couple had three children.

Baratta died in 1971 in San Salvador.

== Notable works ==
- Iglesia El Calvario, San Salvador
- Iglesia de Santa Lucía (known as Iglesia del Cristo Negro de Juayúa), Juayúa
- Basílica Nuestra Señora de Guadalupe, Antiguo Cuscatlán, San Salvador
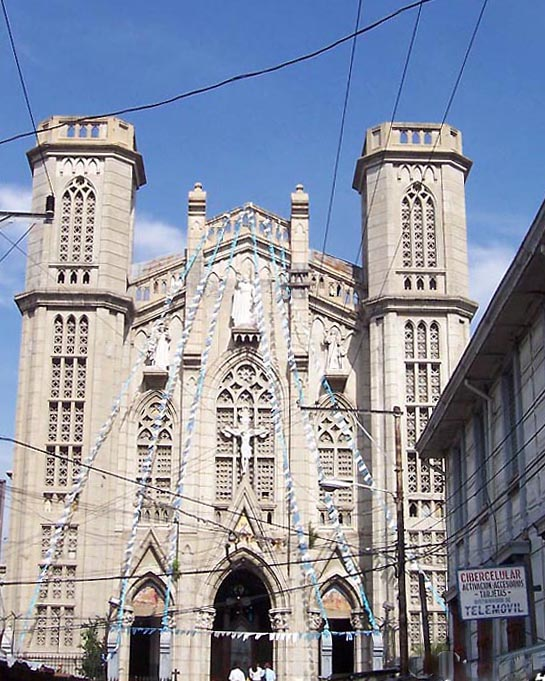
Iglesia El Calvario

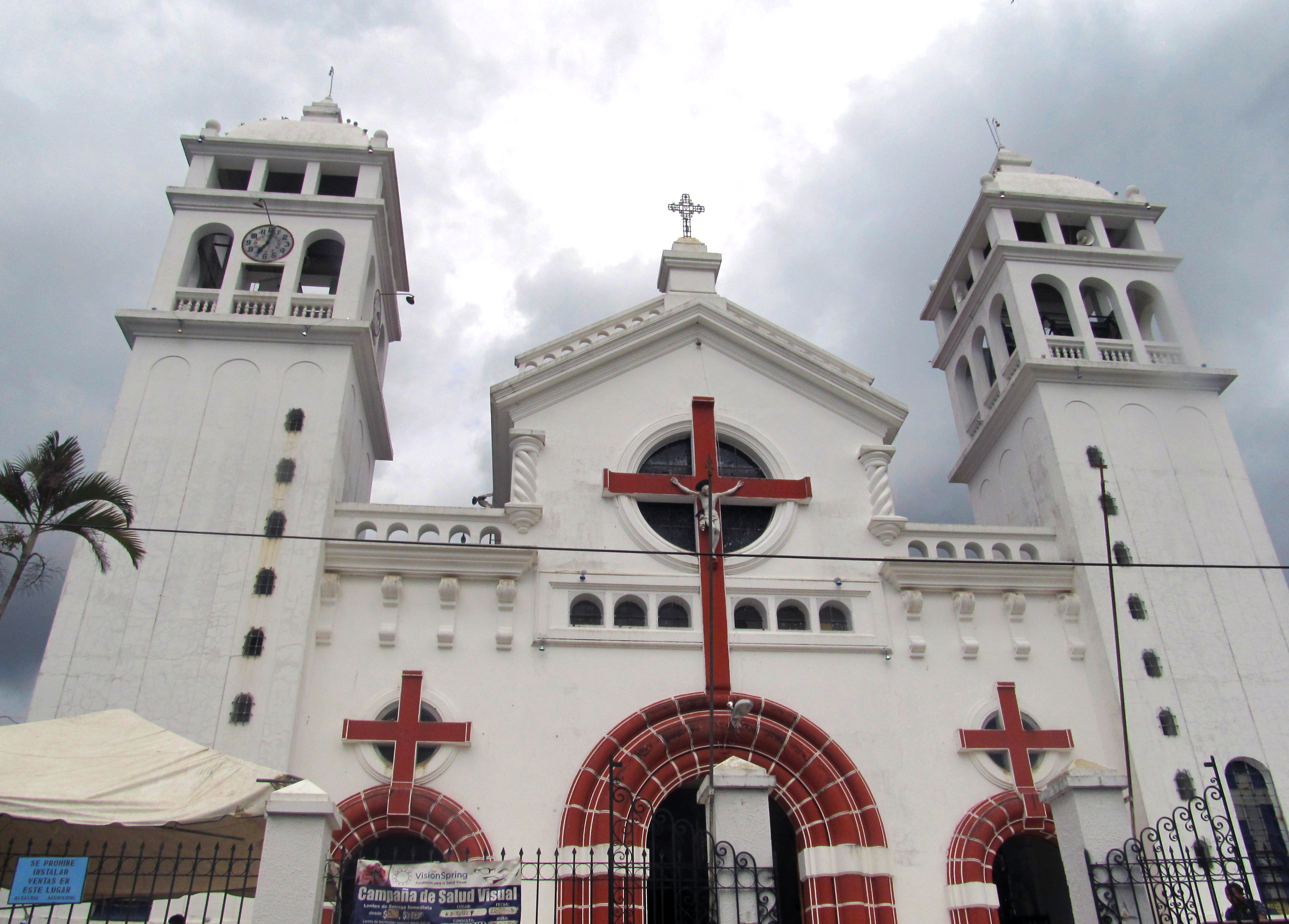
Iglesia de Santa Lucía
