= Donna Barrell =

American screenwriter

- Born: Teresa Luisa Michelena; June 26, 1889; Detroit, Michigan, U.S.
- Died: April 5, 1941 (aged 51); Los Angeles, California, U.S.
- Other names: Mrs. Walter Hitchcock
- Occupations: Screenwriter, actress
- Spouses: Walter Hitchcock (died 1917); Joseph Barrell (died)
- Relatives: Beatriz Michelena; Vera Michelena (half-sisters)

Donna Barrell (born Teresa Luisa Michelena, June 26, 1889 – April 5, 1941) was an American screenwriter and actress active primarily during the silent era.

== Biography ==
Donna was born in Detroit, Michigan, to opera singers Fernando Michelena and Catherine Maddock; her father was from Venezuela, and her mother was from England. Her parents split when she was young, and her father had two daughters, actresses Vera Michelena and Beatriz Michelena, from his marriage to the soprano Francis Lenord (1867–1912). She grew up primarily with her mother and stepfather.

As a young woman, she developed an interest in acting, and she married fellow actor Walter Hitchcock; the two began working in the early motion picture industry on the East Coast before Hitchcock died of an illness in 1917. She wrote films like The Love Master and A Certain Young Man during the 1920s under the name Donna Barrell; she also made uncredited appearances in a number of films. She died in Los Angeles in 1941; she had no children with Hitchcock or her second husband, Joseph Barrell.

== Selected filmography ==
As screenwriter:

- Merrily Yours (1933)
- A Certain Young Man (1928)
- The Love Master (1924)
- Captain Jinks' Cure (1917)

As actress:

- The Love Master (1924)
- Life's Shop Window (1914)
- Uncle Tom's Cabin (1914)
