= Rigo Nova =

Honduran-born American actor and writer

- Born: Rigoberto Nova Matute; December 12, 1979 (age 46); San Pedro Sula, Honduras
- Occupations: IT, Actor

Rigo Nova (born December 12, 1979), born Rigoberto Nova Matute, is a Honduran-born American actor and writer. His background is Engineering, Mathematics, and Acting. He and his mother (Amanda Matute) founded "Light for Honduras" - a non-profit organization geared to help those of need in Honduras.
