= History of psychosurgery =

Psychosurgery, also called neurosurgery for mental disorder or functional neurosurgery, is surgery in which brain tissue is destroyed with the aim of alleviating the symptoms of mental disorder. It was first used in modern times by Gottlieb Burckhardt in 1891, but only in a few isolated instances, not becoming more widely used until the 1930s following the work of Portuguese neurologist António Egas Moniz. The 1940s was the decade when psychosurgery was most popular, largely due to the efforts of American neurologist Walter Freeman; its use has been declining since then. Freeman's particular form of psychosurgery, the lobotomy, was last used in the 1970s, but other forms of psychosurgery, such as the cingulotomy and capsulotomy have survived.

== Early history ==
Trepanning, the practice of drilling holes in the skull, was performed from prehistoric times to the early Middle Ages and then again during the Renaissance. There is speculation that some of these operations were carried out on people who had mental disorders or epilepsy. Trepanation was depicted in prints, woodblocks, and paintings, including the allegorical painting by Hieronymus Bosch, The Extraction of the Stone of Madness, which depicts the extraction of a "brain stone".

In 1891 Gottlieb Burckhardt, the superintendent of a psychiatric hospital in Switzerland, published the results of an operation on the brains of six patients. The operation was a topectomy, in which parts of the frontal, parietal and temporal cortex were excised. Other psychiatrists were not enthusiastic about his work and he abandoned his operations. The Estonian neurosurgeon Ludvig Puusepp also operated on psychiatric patients in St Petersburg in 1910.

== 1930s ==
It was the work of the Portuguese neurologist António Egas Moniz in the 1930s that led to a wider use of psychosurgery. Moniz, working with neurosurgeon Pedro Almeida Lima, started operating on patients in late 1935. The first operations involved injections of alcohol into the frontal lobes of patients to destroy white matter; Moniz then devised an instrument he called a leucotome to remove small cores of white matter. He coined the terms leucotomy and psychosurgery. Moniz's methods were taken up in the United States by the neurological team headed by Walter Freeman and the neurosurgeon James Watts, who, in the words of American psychiatrist Victor Swayze, "did more to promote the use of psychosurgery than anyone else in the world". At first they used the same technique as Moniz, but then they devised their own technique which more completely severed the connections between the frontal lobes and deeper structures. They coined the term lobotomy for the operation, and it became known as the standard prefrontal lobotomy or leucotomy of Freeman and Watts. Freeman and Watts eventually performed 600 of these standard operations; in the United Kingdom neurosurgeon Wylie McKissock performed over 1,400.

The two foremost promoters of psychosurgery in the 1930s, Moniz in Portugal and Freeman in the US, were both neurologists. Psychiatrists were later found amongst both the supporters and critics of psychosurgery. José de Matos Sobral Cid, who had initially allowed Moniz to operate on patients from his asylum, became a critic of the procedure. Freeman was at first not allowed to operate on patients at the hospital where he was director of laboratories, St. Elizabeth's, Washington, as the superintendent William Alanson White was opposed to the operation. White's successor, Winfred Overholser, cautiously allowed Freeman to operate at the hospital. British psychiatrist William Sargant, on a visit to Washington in 1939, met Freeman and was sufficiently impressed with the results of his operation on three patients to introduce it into the United Kingdom and to remain a lifelong advocate of psychosurgery. Until Freeman introduced the technique of transorbital lobotomy, psychosurgery required the skills of a surgeon.

The standard lobotomy/leucotomy involved drilling burr holes in the skull on the side of the head and inserting a cutting instrument; it was thus a "closed" operation, with the surgeon unable to see exactly what he was cutting. In 1937 J.G. Lyerly at the Florida State Hospital developed a similar operation but reached the brain via larger holes in the forehead and was thus able to see what he was cutting. Some neurosurgeons preferred this "open" technique to Freeman and Watts' closed technique as it was less likely to damage blood vessels; it became the most widely used standard lobotomy/leucotomy in the United States.

== 1940s ==
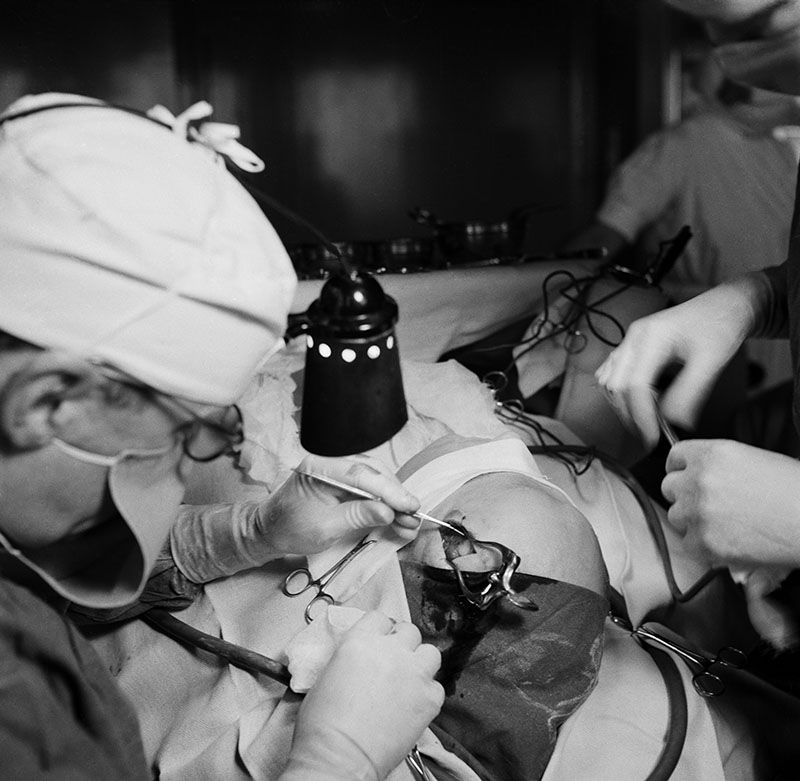
Lobotomy (Sweden, 1949)

The use of psychosurgery increased during the 1940s, and there was a proliferation of the techniques used for the operation. In 1946 Freeman developed the transorbital lobotomy, based on a technique first reported by Italian psychiatrist Amarro Fiamberti. In this operation an ice-pick like instrument was inserted through the roof of the orbit (eye socket), driven in with a mallet, and swung to and fro to cut through the white matter. Freeman used electroconvulsive therapy in the place of a normal anaesthetic and carried out the operation without the aid of a neurosurgeon. This led to a rift with Watts. Freeman performed over 4,000 of these transorbital operations.

During the 1940s neurosurgeons devised other methods of psychosurgery in the hope of avoiding the undesirable effects of the standard operation that were becoming increasingly apparent as long-term follow-up studies were conducted. William Beecher Scoville, of Hartford Hospital and Yale Medical School, developed a method of cortical undercutting. Two of the techniques still in use today date from this period: Jean Talaraich in France developed the capsulotomy, while at Oxford in England Hugh Cairns performed the first cingulotomies in the late 1940s. The 1940s also saw the introduction of the stereotactic frame, which would allow surgeons to find their bearings more accurately when doing closed operations.

Many countries started to use psychosurgery during this decade. In 1939 Freeman had given a talk at the International Congress in Neurology in Copenhagen and, although initially met with scepticism by Scandinavian psychiatrists, they were soon using psychosurgery on patients, especially those diagnosed as schizophrenic. In Sweden and Denmark operations were performed in neurosurgical wards; in Norway they were more often carried out by visiting orthopaedic surgeons in psychiatric hospitals. Norway was also the only Scandinavian country to use transorbital lobotomy.

In Britain, the first psychosurgical operations were carried out in Bristol in late 1940 and early 1941. By 1947 the Board of Control was able to publish a report entitled Pre-frontal leucotomy in 1,000 cases. Psychosurgery was also introduced into British East Africa. In 1946 twenty prefrontal leucotomies were performed, mostly on African women, in Bulawayo. The next year a further 70 were performed, but the number declined after that.

In 1949 Moniz shared the Nobel Prize in Physiology or Medicine because of his "discovery of the therapeutic value of leucotomy in certain psychoses". He had already been nominated three times for his work on radiology. A further nomination in 1943, this time by Walter Freeman for psychosurgery, had led to an evaluation of the operation by Erik Essen-Möller, a professor of psychiatry. His report to the Nobel Committee pointed out that Moniz had paid too little attention to the side-effects of psychosurgery and had not done any in-depth observations. Essen-Möller also studied the published literature on psychosurgery; he found a mortality rate of about 3.5 per cent, with other patients left in the state of "a surgically induced childhood". He also noted the lack of comparison with other treatments and concluded that it was a mutilating treatment with a "negative side yet to be heard", and did not deserve the prize. Moniz received nine nominations in 1949 (five from Lisbon, three from Brazil and one from Copenhagen) and this led to a special report by the neurosurgeon Herbert Olivecrona, who deemed that Moniz's hypothesis "that emotional tension could be eliminated by leucotomy" had been proven. He opined that the personality changes following surgery were of subordinate importance and that the death rate, which he put at one or two per cent by then, was "not worth mentioning". Accordingly, Moniz was awarded the prize.

== 1950s and 1960s ==
In spite of the award of the Nobel Prize to Moniz, the popularity of psychosurgery decreased during the 1950s. This has been attributed to "an increased awareness of the negative changes of personality in addition to the introduction of new anti-psychotic medication". In the United States the use of psychosurgery probably peaked at an estimated 5,000 or so operations annually.

In Britain in the mid-1950s, about three-quarters of psychosurgical operations were standard pre-frontal leucotomies. By the end of the decade, some 500 operations were carried out every year. The standard operation was on its way out, but still accounted for about one-fifth of operations.

From 1940 to 1960, Scandinavia used psychosurgery at a rate of about two-and-a-half times the rate of the United States. Gaustad in Norway became a particular centre for psychosurgery in the mid-1950s, with money from the United States.

In the United States in the 1960s up until the early 70s, Harvard Medical School, Neurosurgeon Vernon H. Mark at Boston City Hospital, and his associate, Professor of Psychiatry Dr Frank R. Ervin, carried out research on electroencephalographic recordings on the skull (EEG), cerebral surface, as well as deep structures of the brain. They studied patients with EEG abnormalities and overt seizure disorders associated with uncontrolled aggression and found that many of these patients had abnormalities of the brain causing their temporal lobe epilepsy or psychomotor seizures. Their treatment was stimulation or ablation of the amygdala, unilaterally or bilaterally. Approximately 20 amygdalotomies were performed, with many patients improved but not necessarily cured. This work in psychosurgery became highly controversial and as the debate on psychosurgery heated up in the 70s it was abandoned.

Innovations in surgical techniques continued apace. In Britain in 1964 Geoffrey Knight developed the subcaudate tractotomy, implanting radioactive seeds in the brain to destroy tissue. This was to become the most widely used type of psychosurgery in Britain, until it was abandoned some thirty years later. In Tulane in the United States, Robert Heath and colleagues in the 1950s began experimenting with deep brain stimulation as a treatment for psychiatric disorders. The Tulane programme would continue until the 1970s.

== 1970s to the 1980s ==
The 1970s was a decade of ethical debate about psychosurgery. In the United States this debate followed the publication of a book entitled Violence and the Brain, in which the authors advocated psychosurgery as a way to prevent violence, and then a landmark legal case (Kaimowitz v the Department of Mental Health) which concerned a prisoner's ability to consent to psychosurgery. Psychosurgery was criticized in the US in the late 1960s and 1970s by psychiatrist Peter Breggin who identified all psychosurgery with the lobotomy as a rhetorical device. As a result of this controversy, the National Commission for the Protection of Human Subjects of Biomedical and Behavioral Research held hearings on psychosurgery. Its report was favourable and concluded that research on psychosurgery should continue.

In the United Kingdom, a survey found that in the mid-1970s about 150 people a year were undergoing psychosurgery. A few people underwent the standard pre-frontal leucotomy; the most commonly used operation was subcaudate tractotomy. Methods used to destroy tissue included thermocoagulation, suction, radioisotopes and leucotomes. By far the most common diagnosis of those undergoing psychosurgery was depression, followed by anxiety, violence, obsessive-compulsive disorder, and schizophrenia. The Mental Health Act 1983 legislated for the use of psychosurgery. Section 57 stipulated that it could only be used on patients who had consented to it, and when a psychiatrist from the Mental Health Act Commission had authorised it and the psychiatrist and two non-medical people from the commission considered that the consent was valid. By the end of the 1980s about 20 patients a year were undergoing psychosurgery in the United Kingdom.

== 1990s to the present ==
There are four different psychosurgical techniques that have been in common use in recent years: anterior cingulotomy, subcaudate tractotomy, limbic leucotomy and anterior capsulotomy.

In the United Kingdom, psychosurgery continued during the 1990s at the rate of fewer than 30 operations a year. In 1999 there were eight operations - one in London, three in Cardiff and three in Dundee, all for depression, anxiety and obsessive-compulsive disorder. In Australia and New Zealand there were two operations a year in the 1990s, down from ten to twenty in the early 1980s. The use of psychosurgery in the United States is difficult to estimate but continues at one centre at least in Massachusetts. Other countries where it continues to be used include Korea, Taiwan, Mexico, Spain, and some South American and Eastern European countries.

Psychosurgery had been prohibited by the Minister of Health in the USSR. In the late 1990s the Institute of the Human Brain in St Petersburg developed a programme of cingulotomy for the treatment of addiction.

Deep brain stimulation is now being used as an alternative to ablative psychosurgery. There is debate about whether or not, for legislative purposes, it should be considered as psychosurgery.

== Effects ==
The purpose of psychosurgery is to reduce the symptoms of mental disorder, and it was recognised that with standard pre-frontal leucotomies this was accomplished at the expense of a person's personality and intellect. British psychiatrist Maurice Partridge, who conducted a follow-up study of 300 patients who had undergone pre-frontal leucotomy, said that the treatment achieved its effects by "reducing the complexity of psychic life". The operation left people with a restricted intellectual range; spontaneity, responsiveness, self-awareness and self-control were reduced, and activity was replaced by inertia.

The degree to which people were damaged by these early operations varied greatly. A few people managed to return to responsible work, while at the other extreme people were left with severe and disabling impairments. Most people fell into an intermediate group, left with some improvement of their symptoms but also with emotional and intellectual deficits to which they had to adjust, for better or worse. On average, there was a mortality of rate of approximately 5 per cent during the 1940s.

Freeman coined the term "surgically induced childhood" and used it constantly to refer the results of lobotomy. The operation left people with an "infantile personality"; a period of maturation would then, according to Freeman, lead to recovery. In an unpublished memoir he described how the "personality of the patient was changed in some way in the hope of rendering him more amenable to the social pressures under which he is supposed to exist". He described one 29-year-old woman as being, following lobotomy, a "smiling, lazy and satisfactory patient with the personality of an oyster" who couldn't remember Freeman's name and endlessly poured coffee from an empty pot. When her parents had difficulty dealing with her behaviour, Freeman advised a system of rewards (ice-cream) and punishment (smacks).

The risks of psychosurgery have been greatly reduced by modern stereotactic techniques, where more discrete lesions are made in the brain. Adverse effects of capsulotomy and cingulotomy include seizures, fatigue and personality changes. The risk of death or vascular injury is extremely small.

Success rates for anterior capsulotomy, anterior cingulotomy, subcaudate tractotomy, and limbic leucotomy in treating depression and OCD have been reported as between 25 and 70 per cent. There remain concerns however about the poor quality of studies and the lack of systematic reviews and meta-analyses.

== Ethics ==
Psychosurgery has always been a controversial treatment, and ethical concerns about its use were raised early in its history. Psychoanalyst Donald Winnicott wrote to The Lancet in 1943 about the "special objection that is easily felt to the treatment of mental disorder by any method that leaves a permanent physical deficiency or deformity of the brain", even if favourable results could sometimes be shown to follow. In the 1950s, Winnicott continued to explore the ethics of psychosurgery, arguing that it altered "the seat of the self", "put a premium on the relief of suffering" and created teams of neurosurgeons with vested interests that could affect evaluation of the operation. By this time, he pointed out, there were many people in the community who had been left with distressing effects of psychosurgery, even though they may have originally had had illnesses that were not without hope of remission.

By the late 1970s, when modified techniques with less devastating consequences had replaced lobotomies, and the number of operations carried out had dropped considerably, ethical concerns revolved around consent. A report in 1977 by the US Department of Health, Education and Welfare highlighted the fact that psychosurgery was an irreversible procedure and that the data regarding its effects were unsatisfactory. There were concerns about consent, especially when the patients were children, prisoners, or detained. There were also concerns about particular uses of psychosurgery, for example in the treatment of aggression or violence, or as a treatment for children.

In England in 1980 lawyer Larry Gostin called for psychosurgery to be subject to "the strictest legal and ethical scrutiny". He identified a number of problems with the newer forms of psychosurgery: the lack of any reliable theoretical position relating to psychosurgery, with different forms of surgery used in similar cases, and similar surgery used for a wide range of psychiatric conditions; the absence of controlled trials; the difficulty in assessing changes in character caused by the surgery; and the irreversible nature of surgery on brain tissue that appeared to be structurally normal. In spite of these ethical concerns, he noted, there had never been in the UK any "guidelines, controls, regulations or monitoring arrangements relating to its use". Gostin argued that psychosurgery should only be given with the consent of the patient and approval of an independent body comprising a multi-disciplinary legal and lay element. His proposals were largely incorporated into the Mental Health Act 1983, and led to a significant fall in the use of psychosurgery in England and Wales.

Ethical debate relating to psychosurgery in the twenty-first century still revolves around questions about benefit, risks, consent and the lack of a rationale for the operation.

== See also ==
- History of psychosurgery in the United Kingdom
- Eternal Sunshine of the Spotless Mind
