= Outline of abnormal psychology =

Overview of and topical guide to abnormal psychology

The following outline is provided as an overview of and topical guide to abnormal psychology:

Abnormal psychology – is the scientific study of abnormal behavior in order to describe, predict, explain, and change abnormal patterns of functioning. Abnormal psychology in clinical psychology studies the nature of psychopathology, its causes, and its treatments. Of course, the definition of what constitutes 'abnormal' has varied across time and across cultures. Individuals also vary in what they regard as normal or abnormal behavior. Additionally, many current theories and approaches are held by psychologists, including biological, psychological, behavioral, humanistic, existential, and sociocultural. In general, abnormal psychology can be described as an area of psychology that studies people who are consistently unable to adapt and function effectively in a variety of conditions. The main contributing factors to how well an individual is able to adapt include their genetic makeup, physical condition, learning and reasoning, and socialization.

== Nature of abnormal psychology ==
Abnormal psychology can be described as all of the following:

- An academic discipline – focused study in one academic field or profession. A discipline incorporates expertise, people, projects, communities, challenges, studies, inquiry, and research areas that are strongly associated with a given discipline.
- One of the social sciences – concerned with society and the relationships among individuals within a society.
  - A branch of psychology – study of mind and behavior.
- An applied science – discipline of science that applies existing scientific knowledge to develop more practical applications, like treating the mentally ill.

=== Essence of abnormal psychology ===
- Abnormality
- Mental disorder
- Psychology
- Psychopathology

== Approaches of abnormal psychology ==
- Somatogenic – abnormality is seen as a result of biological disorders in the brain. This approach has led to the development of radical biological treatments, e.g. lobotomy.
- Psychogenic – abnormality is caused by psychological problems. Psychoanalytic (Freud), Cathartic, Hypnotic and Humanistic Psychology (Carl Rogers, Abraham Maslow) treatments were all derived from this paradigm.

== Mental disorders ==
Mental disorder

- List of mental disorders – examples of mental disorders include:
  - Anxiety disorder
  - Bipolar disorder
  - Delusional disorder
  - Impulse control disorder
    - Kleptomania
    - Pyromania
  - Personality disorder
    - Obsessive–compulsive personality disorder
  - Schizoaffective disorder
  - Schizophrenia
  - Substance use disorder
    - Substance abuse
    - Substance dependence
  - Thought disorder
- Treatment of mental disorders
  - Psychological evaluation
  - Psychotherapy
  - Psychiatric medication

== Mental health professions ==
Mental health profession

- Psychiatry
- Clinical psychology
- Psychiatric rehabilitation
- School psychology
- Clinical social work

== Mental health professionals ==
Mental health professional

- Psychiatrist
- Clinical psychologist
- School psychologist
- Mental health counselor

== History of abnormal psychology ==
History of mental disorders

- History of mental disorders, by type
  - History of anxiety disorders
    - History of posttraumatic stress disorder
  - History of bipolar disorder
  - History of depression
    - History of major depressive disorder
  - History of neurodevelopmental disorders
    - History of autism
    - History of Asperger syndrome
  - History of obsessive–compulsive disorder
  - History of personality disorders
    - History of psychopathy
  - History of schizophrenia
- History of the treatment of mental disorders
  - History of clinical psychology
  - History of electroconvulsive therapy
    - History of electroconvulsive therapy in the United Kingdom
  - History of psychiatry
  - History of psychiatric institutions
  - History of psychosurgery
    - History of psychosurgery in the United Kingdom
    - Lobotomy – consists of cutting or scraping away most of the connections to and from the prefrontal cortex, the anterior part of the frontal lobes of the brain. The purpose of the operation was to reduce the symptoms of mental disorder, and it was recognized that this was accomplished at the expense of the patient's personality and intellect! By the late 1970s, the practice of lobotomy had generally ceased.
  - History of psychotherapy

== Abnormal psychology organizations ==
- American Psychological Association (APA) – largest organization of psychologists in the United States.
- National Institute of Mental Health (NIMH) – part of the U.S. Department of Health and Human Services, it specializes in mental illness research.
- National Alliance on Mental Illness (NAMI) – provides support, education, and advocacy for people affected by mental illness.

== Abnormal psychology publications ==
=== Journals ===
- Behavior Genetics
- British Journal of Clinical Psychology
- Communication Disorders Quarterly
- Journal of Abnormal Child Psychology
- Journal of Abnormal Psychology
- Journal of Clinical Psychology
- Journal of Consulting and Clinical Psychology
- Molecular Psychiatry
- Psychological Medicine
- Psychology of Addictive Behaviors
- Psychology of Violence
- Psychosis (journal)

== Persons influential in abnormal psychology ==
- Sigmund Freud
- Jacques Lacan
- B.F. Skinner
- Deirdre Barrett
- Kay Redfield Jamison
- Theodore Millon

== See also ==
- Outline of psychology
