= History of psychosurgery in the United Kingdom =

Psychosurgery is a surgical operation that destroys brain tissue in order to alleviate the symptoms of mental disorder. The lesions are usually, but not always, made in the frontal lobes. Tissue may be destroyed by cutting, burning, freezing, electric current or radiation. The first systematic attempt at psychosurgery is commonly attributed to the Swiss psychiatrist Gottlieb Burckhardt who operated on six patients in 1888. In 1889 Thomas Claye Shaw reported mental improvement in a case of General Paralysis of the Insane after a neurosurgical intervention. This led to a lively debate in the British Medical Journal on the usefulness of neurosurgery for the treatment of insanity. In the 1930s the Portuguese neurologist Egas Moniz developed a surgical technique for the treatment of mental illness and called it "leucotomy" or "psychosurgery". Moniz' technique was adapted and promoted by American neurologist Walter Freeman and his neurosurgeon colleague James W. Watts. They called their operation, where burr holes are drilled in the side of the skull and the white matter is sliced through in order to sever the connections between the frontal lobes and deeper structures in the brain, lobotomy. In the United Kingdom it became known as the standard Freeman-Watts prefrontal leucotomy. British psychiatrist William Sargant met Freeman on a visit to the United States and on his return to England encouraged doctors at the Burden Neurological Institute in Bristol.

The first British psychosurgical operation was performed in Bristol in December 1940, and by the end of 1944 about 1,000 operations had been carried out in the United Kingdom. By 1954 that figure had risen to about 12,000 with use peaking in 1949.

Beginning in the 1940s doctors devised "modified operations" with less extensive cuts or more specific targets (for example, rostral leucotomy and cingulotomy) in an attempt to reduce the damage done by the surgery. During the 1950s the number of operations declined by more than half, in spite of the fact that Moniz had received a Nobel Prize for psychosurgery in 1949. Reasons for this decline included increasing concern about the deaths and damage caused by the operation, the introduction of neuroleptic drugs, and changing ideas about the nature and treatment of mental illness. By the mid-1970s the use of psychosurgery had declined still further to about 100–150 operations a year, and nearly all were of the modified type. The Mental Health Act 1983 specified that psychosurgery could only be carried out on consenting patients, and then only with the approval of the Mental Health Act Commission. The decline in psychosurgery has continued to 2007, with the latest figures from the Mental Health Act Commission showing that 5 operations were authorised in Wales in the 2-year period 2005–2007. A few operations every year are also performed in Dundee, Scotland. No psychosurgical operations were performed in England between 1999 and 2009; one operation was performed in 2010 in Bristol.

In total, over 20,000 people have undergone psychosurgical operations in the United Kingdom. Women have outnumbered men (by about three to two in the early days, and by even more in recent years). The vast majority of operations have been carried out on young and middle-aged adults, although some older people and, in the past, a very small number of children and teenagers have been operated on. Nowadays the operation is used in the treatment of depression, anxiety and obsessive–compulsive disorder. In the past it was also used in the treatment of schizophrenia and a wide variety of other disorders; some patients had been in a mental hospital for years before operation, others only briefly or not at all.

== Pioneers of psychosurgery in the UK ==
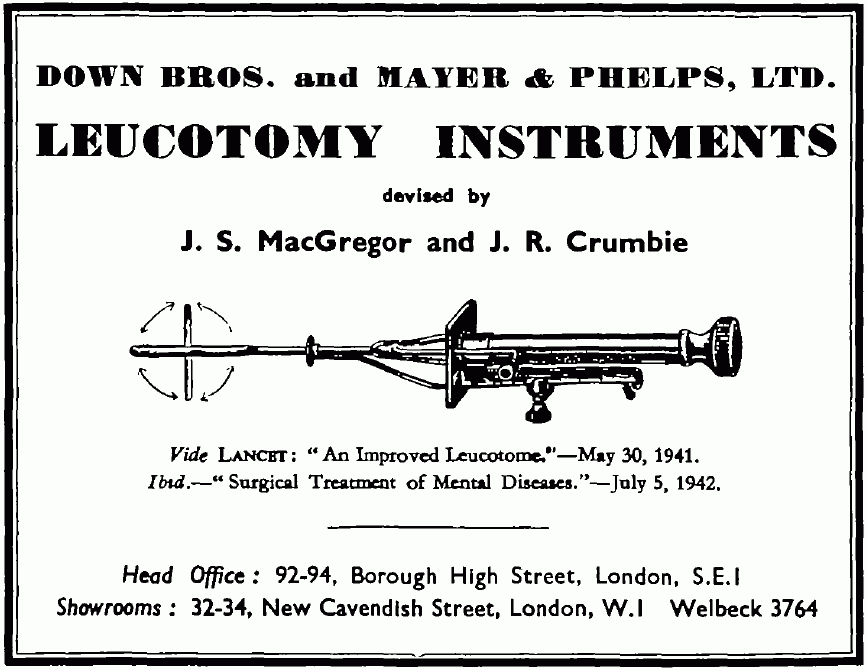
Leucotome, a tool for performing Leucotomies

The first leucotomies in the UK were carried out at the Burden Neurological Institute in Bristol and were a collaboration between Frederick Golla, director of the Burden Neurological Institute, Effie Hutton, clinical director of the Burden Neurological Institute, surgeon F. Wilfred Willway, and the medical superintendents of Barnwood House in Gloucester and Brislington House in Bristol, who volunteered their patients as guinea pigs. Frederick Golla was persuaded to undertake the surgery by psychiatrist William Sargant who had seen three of Freeman's patients in the US and tried to introduce leucotomy at the Belmont Hospital in London, only to be refused permission by London County Council.

The first operation was carried out in December 1940, a further eight over the next four months – all of them on detained patients. The operations were done with a paper knife, using the standard Freeman-Watts technique. Some were performed under local anaesthesia, some under general.

After nine operations the psychiatrists presented the results of the first eight operations in an article in The Lancet in July 1941, omitting the ninth case where a blood vessel was cut and the patient, a 27-year-old woman, died. Of the eight, one died of a heart attack two days after the operation, three were discharged (two of them still suffering from incontinence) and four remained in hospital. One of the discharged patients, a veteran of World War I who had broken down during the bombing raids on Bristol and had been diagnosed as neurotic, was operated on after just 4 days in hospital. These results were considered sufficiently encouraging for the leucotomy programme to continue at the Burden Neurological Institute, and for Sargant to gain permission to introduce leucotomy at the Belmont Hospital in London.

Warlingham Park Hospital, Croydon, Surrey, started to experiment with psychosurgery soon after the Burden Neurological Institute and published the results of their first four operations in the same issue of The Lancet. One patient died. Surgeon John Crumbie designed his own leucotome (instrument for cutting the white matter in the brain) which was constructed by Warlingham's assistant clerk of works, and referred to by Wylie McKissock, who operated with a Cushing brain needle, as a "mechanical egg-whisk". If the patients resisted the surgery they were given electroconvulsive shocks before being anaesthetised.

After the results of at the Burden Neurological Institute and Warlingham Park were published, mental hospitals throughout Great Britain began to use psychosurgery. Pioneering hospitals included:

Crichton Royal Hospital, Dumfries, Scotland: 142 patients had undergone surgery by the end of 1945. Most of them were judged to be "hopeless, chronic invalids" and were selected for surgery on account of being prone to aggressive, destructive and impulsive behaviour.

Graylingwell Hospital, Chichester, West Sussex: 345 patients were operated on between 1942 and 1947.

Belmont Hospital, Sutton, Surrey: mainly neurotic patients who had never been in a mental hospital were treated under the direction of Sargant for disorders such as dermatitis, battle neurosis, anorexia and depression.

Runwell Hospital, Essex: psychiatrist Rolf Strom-Olsen and surgeon Geoffrey Knight formed a psychosurgery partnership that was to last for thirty years. 116 operations had been carried out by the end of 1945, with six deaths. The first few patients had been selected for what Knight called their "low potential", so that harmful effects could be studied before the operation was used in cases of "higher potentiality".

Bexley Hospital, Kent: 48 leucotomies, with 3 deaths, had been performed by McKissock by mid 1945. McKissock developed a peripatetic psychosurgery service, visiting hospitals all over the south of England (except for part of Kent, which was the territory of Knight) and Wales on Saturdays and performing thousands of leucotomies.

The North Wales Hospital, Denbigh: Leucotomy was introduced in 1942. The first series of 24 patients operated on 1942–1944 were selected for their failure to respond to other treatments (usually electroconvulsive therapy) and, in at least half the cases, the demands they made on nursing staff. Operations were done by a local GP/general surgeon. One patient died.

Netherne Hospital, Coulsdon, Surrey: in 1942 Eric Cunningham Dax, medical superintendent of Netherne Hospital, called in surgeon Eric Radley Smith to operate on patients. Before the year was out, fifty patients had undergone surgery, and in April 1943 the results were published in the Journal of Mental Science. Cunningham Dax described how he selected patients:

"The operation was carried out with the primary object of relieving the most disturbed patients in the hospital quite independently of their poor prognosis. They formed a large proportion of the most violent, hostile, noisy, excited, destructive or obscene cases in the hospital; the type who distress their relatives, upset the other patients and consume the time and energy which could be put to so much better purpose by the staff".

Two died of cerebral haemorrhage, two were discharged (of whom one relapsed); of those remaining in hospital two-thirds had shown at least some improvement, needing less staff time and supervision.

St Lawrence's Hospital, Caterham, Surrey: in March 1944 a programme of leucotomy was begun on "mental defectives". Crumbie operated on one patient, McKissock and his assistant, McCall, on a further 43 (nine of them under the age of 21). There were five deaths and the majority of patients showed little or no improvement, with twelve of them becoming worse. Doctors at St Lawrence's Hospital decided to abandon the experiment. Rampton Hospital, another mental deficiency institution, began using psychosurgery in January 1947. Twenty patients including a fourteen-year-old underwent surgery in little over a year. One patient died. Superintendent George Mackay found the results sufficiently encouraging to extend the programme to include "a wider group of clinical types". One young woman who underwent a leucotomy turned out to have been detained illegally for eighteen years.

By the end of 1944 about 1,000 psychosurgical operations had been performed in Great Britain, and the Board of Control published the results of a survey in a 30-page booklet. They described the operation in the following terms:

Crudely described the purpose of the operation is to break the connection between the patient’s thoughts and his emotions. It is to relieve the connection between the patient’s thoughts and his emotions. It is to relieve mental tension, to take the sting out of experience and thus to favour improvement or to hasten recovery from mental disorder.

Risks were listed as death due to cerebral haemorrhage or infection; epilepsy; and personality changes. A text book of the day went into more detail about personality changes, suggesting that they always occurred to greater or lesser extent and left the patient with diminished judgement, childish behaviour, carelessness, loss of ambition, and generally living at a lower level than previously. There was also the possibility of intellectual deterioration. Overall in the Board of Control survey six per cent of patients had died (half of them directly as a result of the operation); 36 per cent had left hospital and 58 per cent remained in hospital (often described as quieter or easier to nurse). Patients who were depressed and had not been ill for long were much more likely to have left hospital than those who had a schizophrenic illness and had been in hospital longer.

== Advances in surgical technique ==
Beginning in the early 1940s, psychiatrists and surgeons experimented with different techniques of psychosurgery, mainly in order to reduce the risk of death, complications and severe personality damage associated with the operation and thus extend its use to depressed and neurotic patients.

=== Transorbital leucotomy ===
Transorbital leucotomy (transorbital lobotomy in the US) was a technique invented by Italian psychiatrist Amarro Fiamberti and taken up by American neurologist Walter Freeman, with whose name it is particularly associated. Instead of holes being drilled in the skull, a sharp instrument was hammered through the roof of the eye-socket (the orbital plate) and then swung through the white matter in the frontal lobes. The advantages of the method were that the services of a neurosurgeon could be dispensed with (Freeman also dispensed with the services of an anaesthetist, as he used electroconvulsive shock to produce unconsciousness) and the restricted cut produced fewer personality changes.

On a visit to England in July 1948 Freeman read a paper on his new technique at the Burden Neurological Institute in Bristol, and in September the paper was published in The Lancet. Transorbital leucotomy did not become widely used in the UK, but a few psychiatrists experimented with it. John Walsh at Tone Vale Hospital in Somerset operated on eight women in 1949, on three occasions (including one as a demonstration at a meeting of the south-western division of the Royal Medico-Psychological Association) using electroconvulsive shock as an anaesthetic. Walsh was disappointed with the results, finding "no definite clinical improvements" in any of the patients. Psychiatrist Alan Edwards at Napsbury Hospital in Hertfordshire performed transorbital leucotomies with conventional anaesthesia on 71 patients between February 1949 and February 1950, and found it less effective than a standard leucotomy. By mid 1952, 7 deaths due to cerebral haemorrhage during transorbital leucotomy had been reported to the Board of Control.

=== Rostral leucotomy ===
Rostral leucotomy, in which holes were drilled in the top of the skull and the cut made in a downwards direction, was devised by McKissock. Although McKissock approached from the opposite direction, the cut was similar to that of Freeman's transorbital leucotomy, undercutting Brodmann's areas 9 and 10 of the frontal cortex. McKissock was scornful of transorbital operations, considering them an offence "against established aseptic principles". McKissock continued to use the standard prefrontal operation where the aim was to control the behaviour of disturbed patients. In 1957, for example, he performed 125 rostral and 19 standard leucotomies.

=== Cingulotomy ===
Cingulotomy, where part of the anterior cingulate gyrus is destroyed, was pioneered in Great Britain in 1948 by Hugh Cairns, first Nuffield Professor of Surgery at the University of Oxford. Similar operations accounted for 10 per cent of psychosurgical operations in the United Kingdom in the mid-1970s. In recent years stereotactic anterior cingulotomies have been performed by the psychosurgical unit at Ninewells Hospital, Dundee, Scotland.

=== Subcaudate tractotomy ===
In 1949 Knight at Runwell Hospital started performing the operation of orbital undercutting (called orbital leucotomy in Britain) devised by American surgeon William Beecher Scoville, in which the lower quadrants of the frontal lobes were cut via holes in the forehead. Knight later modified Scoville's operation to restrict the cut to the lower medial quadrants. Further modifications dating from 1961 included the use of a stereotactic frame and brain images to make it easier to navigate in the frontal lobes, and the use of radioactive seeds (up to 20) to destroy tissue in the subcaudate region. The operation was then called stereotactic subcaudate tractotomy and by the mid-1970s, although only used at two neurosurgical units (which by that time had replaced mental hospitals as the sites for psychosurgical operations), it accounted for 30 per cent of operations in the United Kingdom. Knight operated at the Brook Hospital in South London in collaboration with retired psychiatrist Strom-Olsen and then with psychiatrist Paul Bridges. Knight retired in the early 1970s (the unit was named the Geoffrey Knight psychosurgical unit in his honour) and was replaced by John Bartlett. In all, nearly 1300 subcaudate tractotomies were carried out at the Brook Hospital, with one death attributed wholly to the operation. During the 1980s the unit accounted for over 75 per cent of the psychosurgical operations carried out in Britain. The unit ceased operating in 1994. A team at Kings College Hospital under psychiatrist Stuart Checkley took over the work of the unit and performed 23 stereotactic subcaudate tractotomies over the next five years, using radiofrequency to destroy brain tissue.

=== Capsulotomy ===
Capsulotomy, or anterior capsulotomy, in which part of the internal capsule in the frontal lobe is destroyed, was first used in France in the late 1940s and used extensively in Sweden. Since the early 1990s stereotactic anterior capsulotomies been performed at Ninewells Hospital, Dundee, Scotland, and at the University of Wales Hospital, Cardiff, Wales.

=== Limbic leucotomy ===
Limbic leucotomy was developed in the early 1970s by surgeon Alan Richardson at Atkinson Morley's Hospital. The operation combines stereotactic subcaudate tractotomy and cingulotomy, with up to 14 cryogenic lesions made in the brain. Limbic leucotomies continued to be performed at Atkinson Morley's Hospital until 1999.

=== Multifocal electroleucoagulation ===
Multifocal electroleucoagulation, in which white matter is gradually destroyed by passing electric current through electrodes implanted in the frontal lobes, was the invention of doctors at the Burden Neurological Institute in 1959. Ten sheaths, each containing six or seven electrodes, were implanted in the brain and connected to a socket on the head. Every week direct currents of 10–20 mA were passed for about 3 minutes through 2–4 selected electrodes to make electrolytic lesions. These experiments continued throughout the 1960s and into the 1970s. In the mid-1990s there were plans to re-introduce multifocal electrocoagulation but they came to nothing.

=== Psychosurgery on the temporal lobe ===
In most psychosurgical operations the intention is to destroy tissue in the frontal lobes, but a few operations have been done on the temporal lobes. Amygdalotomy, which destroys the amygdala, has been performed on small numbers of people in Britain. A group of Scottish doctors in the early 1970s experimented with the operation in the treatment of aggressive behaviour. Their patients included one as young as eight, and several others aged under 20. In England a few hypothalamotomies, where the hypothalamus is the target, were performed for the same reason.

== Decline of psychosurgery ==
The use of psychosurgery in the United Kingdom peaked in the late 1940s and early 1950s, with nearly 1,500 operations a year. Although some mental hospitals never used psychosurgery, or abandoned it after a brief trial, only a few voices were raised against it in the medical literature. Retired professor James MacDonald reminded psychiatrists at the Royal Medico-Psychological Association's March 1943 symposium on pre-frontal leucotomy that the frontal lobes represented the highest form of evolution, that there was no rational basis for leucotomy, and that the operation was of questionable legality. Donald Winnicott in a letter to The Lancet in the early days of leucotomy suggested that those who wanted to perform destructive operations should first establish that mental disorders were actually "brain-tissue diseases". Clifford Allen questioned the ethics of operating on people to make them easier to nurse and said it was little less than criminal to operate on people who were mildly or only recently ill.

Several works published in the 1950s drew attention to the damaging and sometimes fatal effects of psychosurgery, though their authors were not opposed to the treatment. Maurice Partridge's follow-up of 300 patients operated on by McKissock revealed a higher death rate than was usually acknowledged, with six per cent of patients dying wholly or partly as a result of the surgery. The book described how many patients, even those whose surgery was considered as success by their doctors, were left with serious disabilities. Walter Maclay, president of the section of psychiatry of the Royal Society of Medicine, chose the subject of "death due to treatment" for his 1952 address. He counted 180 deaths directly resulting from leucotomy over a period of five and a half years. Also mentioned as a "possible lethal complication of leucotomy" were three murders committed by people who had undergone leucotomy. In his book Personality changes following frontal leucotomy Peter MacDonald Tow, psychiatrist at Runwell Hospital, described his search all over England for "normal subjects" – people who in spite of having been selected for leucotomy did not have severe mental illnesses. Eventually he found sixty subjects. Several died as a result of the operation, or were left too damaged to co-operate with testing. MacDonald Tow's research on the survivors demonstrated that the operation often caused serious intellectual damage.

When the Board of Control published their second survey in 1961 the use of psychosurgery had declined by more than half; the decline being attributed to an awareness of the risks of irreversible effects and the introduction in 1955 of neuroleptic drugs. By 1961 nearly half of mental hospitals in the United Kingdom were no longer carrying out leucotomies. Approximately 500 operations were performed a year, and were unevenly distributed over the country. Someone hospitalised in the North East Metropolitan region was more than 15 times more likely to undergo psychosurgery than someone hospitalised in the neighbouring East Anglian region. There were also random differences in the type of operation used and the type of illness treated. Twenty per cent of operations were still standard pre-frontal leucotomies; the rest were new operations, and a few centres used stereotactic techniques. Some hospitals still used psychosurgery to treat chronic schizophrenia, in others the only indications were depression or obsessive illness. Psychosurgery continued to decline during the 1960s and 1970s. In 1976 about 120 operations were carried out in the United Kingdom. There were still a few standard leucotomies, but by the mid-1970s stereotactic subcaudate tractotomy, cingulotomy and stereotactic limbic leucotomy accounted for more than 50 per cent of operations. Depression was the most common diagnosis; people were also operated on for anxiety, violence, obsessive-compulsive disorder, schizophrenia, anorexia and other diagnoses.

== Legislation ==
By the early 1980s the number of psychosurgical operations carried out annually in the United Kingdom had fallen to fewer than 70. Most of them were stereotactic subcaudate tractotomies performed at the Geoffrey Knight psychosurgical unit at the Brook Hospital, London. The Mental Health Act 1983 (which covers England and Wales) classified psychosurgery as a treatment that could only be carried out with a patient's consent. Under section 57 of the Act, which applies to both detained and informal patients, a panel of three people appointed by the Mental Health Act Commission has to establish that the patient is consenting. Then the psychiatrist on the panel authorises the operation if it is likely to alleviate or prevent deterioration in the patient's condition. In Scotland, under section 234 of the Mental Health (Care and Treatment) (Scotland) Act 2003, psychosurgery can only be carried out on consenting patients if a panel from the Mental Welfare Commission confirms that the patient's consent is valid and that the operation is in their best interests. It may also be carried out on incapable patients, as long as they are not objecting, with Court of Session approval. Since the law came into force, no non-consenting patients have undergone psychosurgery.

Since the introduction of the Mental Health Act 1983 no more than 28 psychosurgical operations have been carried out in the United Kingdom in any year. No operations were performed in England between 1999 and 2009; Frenchay Hospital, Bristol, performed one anterior cingulotomy in 2010. A few stereotactic anterior capsulotomies are performed every year at the University of Wales Hospital, Cardiff. Stereotactic anterior cingulotomies are performed at the Dundee Royal Infirmary in collaboration with the psychiatric unit at Ninewells Hospital. The Cardiff and Dundee units introduced psychosurgery programmes in the early 1990s and have used psychosurgery in the treatment of depression, obsessive-compulsive disorder and anxiety.

== Well-known people who have undergone psychosurgery in the UK ==
- Josef Hassid (1923–1950), Polish violinist, came to Britain aged 14 with his father in 1938 to give concert performances and recitals in London, and make recordings for HMV. The outbreak of World War II prevented their return to Poland. In 1941 Hassid had a breakdown and was admitted to St Andrew's Hospital, Northampton, where he was given insulin coma therapy and electroconvulsive therapy. He was later detained in Long Grove Hospital, Epsom, and underwent a leucotomy there in 1950. He died 17 days later of a brain infection.
- Ronald Senator, Pulitzer Prize nominated British composer, underwent a leucotomy in St Andrew's Hospital, Northampton, in 1950. He described the experience in his book Requiem Letters (Marion Boyers Publishers, 1996).
- Lena Zavaroni (1963–1999), Scottish child star and singer who had suffered from anorexia and depression for many years, underwent a stereotactic anterior capsulotomy at the University of Wales Hospital in Cardiff in 1999. She died three weeks later from pneumonia (which her doctors considered was not related to the surgery).
- The 13th Earl of Galloway was diagnosed as schizophrenic when young and underwent psychosurgery at St Mary's Hospital in London in 1952. His story is told in Louise Carpenter's book An Unlikely Countess: Lily Budge and the 13th Earl of Galloway. (HarperCollins, 2004).

== Note on terminology ==
Egas Moniz coined two terms to describe his operation: leucotomy (cutting of the white matter of the brain) and psychosurgery (surgery for psychiatric disorder). The American neurologist Walter Freeman and neurosurgeon James Watts adapted Moniz's techniques and coined a new term: lobotomy (cutting of the lobe). In the United Kingdom, psychiatrists used the Freeman-Watts surgical technique but retained the terminology of Moniz – leucotomy and psychosurgery. In the 1940s, 1950s and 1960s the term leucotomy was used as a generic term with writers distinguishing between the standard, pre-frontal, or Freeman-Watts leucotomy on the one hand and modified leucotomies, such as rostral leucotomy, cingulotomy, etc., on the other. In the 1970s the term psychosurgery became more popular as a generic term, with individual operations being named according to the part of the brain in which tissue is destroyed, for example, cingulotomy, capsulotomy, subcaudate tractotomy, amygdalotomy, etc. The term leucotomy is still used to refer to the standard prefrontal leucotomies of the 1940s, 1950s, 1960s and 1970s, and is occasionally used as a generic term for psychosurgical operations. Some doctors prefer the term neurosurgery for mental disorder (NMD) to psychosurgery.

The American term lobotomy has never been used by medical writers in the UK to describe a psychosurgical operation on the frontal lobe. The standard Freeman-Watts operation, called a lobotomy in the US, was called a leucotomy in the UK. Freeman later developed a psychosurgical technique in which an instrument is inserted through the eye-socket. It became known as a transorbital lobotomy in the US and a transorbital leucotomy in the UK (where it was less popular). However the term lobotomy is occasionally used by British journalists synonymously with leucotomy, either to describe the standard operations of former decades or occasionally as a generic term for all psychosurgical operations.
