= History of health care =

History of health care may refer to

- History of medicine
- History of hospitals
- History of nursing
- History of public health in the United Kingdom
- history of public health in the United States
- History of public health in Australia
- History of surgery
- History of pathology
- History of pharmacy
- History of psychiatric institutions
- History of hygiene
- History of water supply and sanitation
- History of universal health care
- Timeline of nursing history
- History of mental disorders
- Timeline of medicine and medical technology
- History of psychology
- History of psychiatry
- History of psychosurgery
- History of nutrition
- History of veterinary medicine
- Timeline of history of environmentalism
- History of health care reform in the United States
