= Wolfson Neurorehabilitation Centre =

Medical Institution

The Wolfson Neurorehabilitation Centre, also better known simply as The Wolfson, was a specialist neurorehabilitation centre based in Wimbledon, south west London. The services provided at the centre are now provided at St George's Hospital in Tooting and Queen Mary's Hospital in Roehampton.

== History ==
The Wolfson Neurorehabilitation Centre was opened in 1967 by Princess Marina, the Duchess of Kent. Construction was made possible by a grant of £250,000 from the Wolfson Foundation. Wylie McKissock, Consultant Neurological Surgeon to St George's Hospital from 1944, transformed Atkinson Morley Hospital from a convalescent hospital into a neurological services unit which included neurosurgery, neurology, psychiatry and specialist support services.

The Wolfson Neurorehabilitation Centre was opened to provide rehabilitation services for Atkinson Morley's Hospital and remained in Wimbledon after the transfer of acute neuroscience services from Atkinson Morley's to St George's Hospital in Tooting.

As well as the neurorehabilitation service, the Wolfson is the location of the south west London branch of Headway, the brain injury association.

In 2012 following a consultation into neurorehabilitation services across southwest London the services provided at the Wolfson Neurorehabilitation Centre were moved into St George's Hospital in Tooting and Queen Mary's Hospital in Roehampton.

== Operations ==
The WNRC provides individual and group rehabilitation programmes for patients. The aim is to help patients make the transition from requiring assistance with activities of daily living to becoming sufficiently independent for discharge. Patients receive a weekly timetable that shows their daily scheduled activities.

Day services include a day patient programme, Wolfson Cognitive Assessment Programme (WCAP), Vocational Rehabilitation Programme, Cognitive Group and Pain Management Programme.

In the first few weeks after admission, patients are assessed with regard to their goals and the support required to achieve those goals. Each patient has an allocated "Chair" (keyworker) who oversees their progress through the goal-oriented rehabilitation programme. Within the first two weeks patients should attend a Goal Planning Meeting, where the MDT and the patient, and when appropriate the family, work together to set goals to be attained by the end of their stay in the WNRC. These long-term goals are then broken down into smaller short-term goals. Review meetings are held every 2–3 weeks to review progress.

=== Standards of care ===
The WNRC works within the South Thames Brain Injury Standards for Post Acute Brain Injury Rehabilitation

== Multidisciplinary team ==
MDT members at the WNRC include:

- Occupational therapists
- Clinical Psychologists: including Consultants in Neuropsychology and Pain.
- Physiotherapists
- Speech and language therapists
- Nurses
- Medical staff: including Consultants in Rehabilitation Medicine, Neuropsychiatry and Neurology; Consultants in Pain Management; Consultant specialising in Stroke; Specialist Registrar in Rehabilitation Medicine; clinical assistant.
- Social workers

Other healthcare professionals include:

- Chiropodist
- Dietitian
- Healthcare assistant
- Orthotist
- Pharmacist
- Volunteers
- Students

== Patient population ==
Patients at the WNRC are recovering from an illness or injury of the brain or spine. For example, they may have a stroke, head injury, multiple sclerosis, tumour or other acquired neurological condition. Patients usually have non-progressive conditions and one criterion of admission is that they require input from more than one discipline. The WNRC also has specialist medical and non-medical services for patients suffering from chronic pain.

== See also ==
- Healthcare in London
