= Amarro Fiamberti =

Italian psychiatrist (1894–1970)

Adamo Mario Fiamberti
- Born: 10 September 1894; Stradella, Kingdom of Italy
- Died: 31 August 1970 (aged 75); Feltre, Italy
- Education: University of Turin
- Known for: Transorbital lobotomy Psychosurgery
- Scientific career
- Fields: Psychiatry

Adamo Mario "Amarro" Fiamberti (10 September 1894 – 31 August 1970) was an Italian psychiatrist who was the first to perform a transorbital lobotomy (by accessing the frontal lobe of the brain through the orbits) in 1937. The technique was widely applied by Fiamberti in Italy and by Walter Freeman in the United States, with different tools. Fiamberti was later named Director of the Psychiatric Hospital of Varese, when it was opened in 1964.

== Biography ==
Fiamberti was born in Stradella, Lombardy in 1894. In 1914, he enrolled in the University of Turin's medical and surgical degree program. He enlisted at the start of World War I and served almost continuously, also as an operative, until his discharge on 24 May 1920. In July 1918, he was awarded the Cross of Merit, and the following year, before being dismissed, he had the opportunity to attend the University of Turin, where he graduated on 20 July 1920. Following his natural inclination for the clinic, he was soon appointed effective assistant in the Turin university's human anatomy institute, headed by G. Levi, but he soon turned to the study of nervous and mental diseases and to a career as a doctor. In fact, he was admitted to E. Medea's neuropathology school at the clinical training institutes in Milan in 1921. At the beginning of his career Fiamberti took care both to acquire a good practical experience, and to complete his scientific training: in August 1921, in fact, he took service as an internal doctor in the provincial psychiatric hospital of Brescia and attended advanced courses, necessary, at that time, to allow a qualified access to medical activity in mental hospitals. Between 1921 and 1926, at the University of Turin, he obtained the diplomas of health officer and expert hygienist and attended the clinical and prophylactic course on tuberculosis directed by F. Micheli, followed in Milan the course of radiology in the school of F. Perussia and that of immunology and serodiagnostics at the Institute directed by S. Belfanti. Appointed, following a public competition, section doctor in the provincial psychiatric hospital of Brescia, he continued to serve in the following years, except for a short period between 1927 and 1928, when, after winning the competition, he held the position of head physician in the provincial psychiatric hospital of Verona.

In the meantime, he deepened the study of neuropsychiatric pathology: after having attended in Paris in 1926 the lessons of pathological anatomy of the nervous system held by I. Bertand at the clinic of Salpetrière and those of neuropsychiatry at the clinic of mental diseases and the encephalon directed by H. Claude, he studied the semeiotics of nervous diseases at the school of Medea and attended the clinics of nervous and mental diseases of Pavia and Milan directed respectively by O. Rossi and C. Besta. In addition, to enrich his experience in the field of neurology and neurosurgery, also attended the Civil Hospital of Brescia.

As of 1932, Fiamberti was director of the Psychiatric Hospital of Sondrio; between 1935 and 1937, he moved to Vercelli and was appointed director of the new psychiatric hospital, which was still under construction at the time. He drew up the regulations for the structure's future operation, in addition to overseeing its final completion. He moved to Varese in 1937 to take over the management of the new Bizzozzero Provincial Psychiatric Hospital. He was the director of that hospital until 1964, when he retired. He was given the title of director emeritus in 1970. After leaving the hospital's medical directorship, he was elected to the position of provincial councilor on the Italian Liberal Party's list in 1964, continuing to deal with psychiatric matters in a political capacity.

He died in Feltre (Belluno) on 31 August 1970, after being widowed by Alfonsina Mondino. He had designated the Municipality of Canneto Pavese and the Stradella Hospital as his main heirs, and he had left his book collection to the library of the Varese Neuropsychiatric Hospital.

== Acetylcholinotherapy ==
Fiamberti's proposal for using acetylcholinic acid to treat schizophrenia was part of a larger framework of confident time adherence to shock therapies. Fiamberti had joined the debate after having had experiences with acetylcholine epileptic in nature, and had adhered to the recommendations of these biological therapy practices for psychosis.

Fiamberti considered the following facts:

1) The existence of objectively controlled vascular disturbances in patients with schizophrenia; the presence of vascular alterations observed histologically in necropsied early demented patients and in experimentally catatonized animals.

2) The common factor to all existing methods for the treatment of schizophrenia would be constituted by the violent and profound vascular modifications provoked by several means.

3) The parallelism observed by several authors between the vascular modifications and those of the psychic state.

Fiamberti assumes that the "vascular storm" is caused by an active and violent condition that occurs in vessels activated by choline derivatives, altering the vascular changes seen in precocious dementia, which can be influenced by toxin-infectious causes.

He also claims that the "vascular storm," is a general element in all convulsive processes that work by restoring natural vascular irrigation.

Fiamberti concludes that, while with other methods, the physical or chemical stimulus must achieve the provocation of convulsive phenomena in order to verify the vascular changes that follow, with acetylcholine, it will not be necessary to achieve the provocation of convulsions. In his studies on patients diagnosed with psychological disorders, he used intravenous acetylcholine produced by the pharmaceutical company Roche. Fiamberti's approach ultimately proved to be less aggressive than other forms of shock, both in terms of duration and intensity of the spasms caused, resulting in clear improvements and even recovery of the patients' clinical conditions in several cases, according to Fiamberti himself. The below are Fiamberti's statistical findings for 120 people with schizophrenia treated with acetylcholine: 18 of the 23 patients with schizophrenia, who had been in the hospital for less than a year, were able to leave cured; in three, the recovery was significant; in one, the improvement was only temporary; and one patient remained resistant to therapy. Fiamberti's approach faded rapidly due to the fragility of its theoretical foundations after a brief period of diffusion and application in the 1950s.

== Transorbital lobotomy ==
A lobotomy, also known as a lobectomy or leucotomy, was a neurosurgery approach. It entailed severing the connections between the prefrontal cortex and the rest of the brain. It could be done in two ways: directly removing them or destroying them. The most common side effect was a drastic and permanent change in personality. In the past, lobotomy was used to treat a variety of psychiatric disorders, including schizophrenia, depression, manic-depressive psychosis, and anxiety-related disorders.

Fiamberti's suggestion of leucotomy with the method of the transorbital path yielded the best results and recognition in the international scene. In 1935, Antonio Egas Moniz, a Portuguese physician, performed the first surgery on the oval center of the prefrontal lobe. Starting with the hypothesis that the role of the bonds formed by the connecting fibers, defined as "established connections," in some psychic patients' symptomatology, Moniz proposed to induce limited destruction of those fibers, either with alcohol injections or a special leucotomy, accessing the brain through trepanation holes in the skull. The theoretical foundations of Moniz' operation were immediately debated in Italy, with a reasonable amount of skepticism.

Psychosurgery was the name given to the new discipline, which grew in popularity despite many debates throughout the 1940s and 1950s before being abandoned in the following decades. Fiamberti was in charge of the hospital in Sondrio at the time, which was a long way from the main centers and lacked any neurosurgical collaborations or adequate facilities.

In order to be able to apply the new leucotomy techniques on his hospital's patients, the psychiatrist explored a less invasive intervention than Moniz's trepanation. The idea was suggested to him by a technique that he had seen practiced, for some years, by Achille Mario Dogliotti for cerebral ventriculography, performed with a transorbital puncture. The needle was introduced into the frontal horn of the ventricle passing through the oval center of the prefrontal lobe and Fiamberti thought of using the same instruments for his operative purpose. He inserted a guide needle into the cranial theca, sliding into the space between the supraorbital arch and the eyeball with a strong upward and backward obliquity, perforating the orbital vault about one centimeter behind the superciliary margin. Once the bone's resistance was overcome, he removed the guide needle's stylet and replaced it with a long, thin needle from a blunt tip brain puncture. He treated about ten serious patients, all of whom tolerated the intervention well, and reported his findings in 1937, with a presentation to the scientific community in October 1938. Because the transorbital intervention method did not require a skull trepanation, it had the significant benefit of being able to be used in any psychiatric facility and mastered by all psychiatrists, not just surgeons. Fiamberti was aware of the intervention's theoretical flaws, but he valued the experience of positive outcomes above all else, especially given the paucity of the psychiatric therapeutic arsenal at the time. He stated that leucotomy could not be considered a true treatment for mental illnesses and that the indications had to be limited to chronic cases that were considered irreversible by other means, but he maintained the usefulness of the effects in several patients, in whom he believed he had achieved a positive modification of particularly troubling symptoms such as impulsivity and aggression.

The leucotomy was also well received on the international stage. It was presented at the seventh Réunion des Oto-Neuro-Ophtalmologues et Neuro-Chirurgiens de la Suisse Romande, and Fiamberti recognised his own autonomous placement among the most recommendable mental illness treatment strategies. The American neurologist Walter Freeman, improved the surgical technique, initially by using ice picks (hence the name "ice pick lobotomy") and later by employing more refined equipment. Many people saw these methods as the triumphal path towards successful intervention in mental diseases during those years, to the point where the Italian Society of Psychiatry chose psychosurgery as the first theme of the national congress report in Taormina in 1951. Egas Moniz, the inventor of lobotomy, was awarded the Nobel Prize for Medicine in 1949. However, these methods failed to produce practical results. Lobotomy, already denounced by many doctors as a cruel practice at the height of its success, fell into disrepute and disuse with the advent of Chlorpromazine, a neuroleptic drug. The first country to ban lobotomy was the Soviet Union in 1950 as it was considered a practice that violated all forms of human rights. By the 1970s most nations had banned the procedure. A "light" version of Lobotomy, still used today on patients with drug-resistant epilepsy, is called an anterior temporal leucotomy.

== Others ==
"Il preteso corpo" is a hospital documentary about the testing of the drug (acetylcholine) produced by a well-known pharmaceutical company (Roche) on people considered psychiatrically calibrated that caused a "vascular storm" with horrible seizures. Patients were discharged when they were able to make the fascist salute. Found at the Senigallia Fair market in Milan, signed by Alberto Grifi as a ready-made.

Year: 1977; Format: 16 mm; silent, B&W Duration: 19'

== See also ==
- Gottlieb Burckhardt - Swiss psychiatrist
- António Egas Moniz – Portuguese neurologist (1874–1955)
- James W. Watts - American neurosurgeon
