= Walter Jackson Freeman II =

American physician (1895–1972)

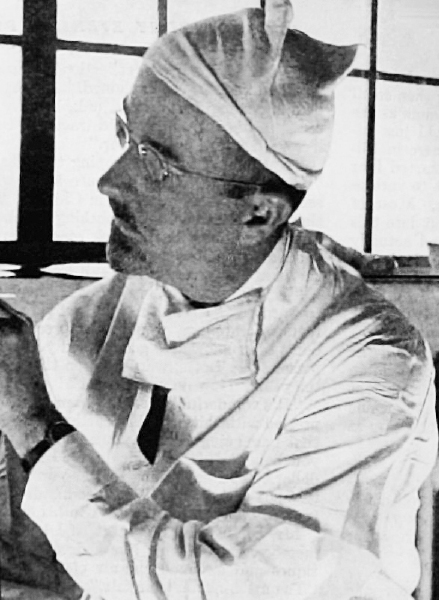
- Walter Jackson Freeman II in 1941
- Born: November 14, 1895; Philadelphia, Pennsylvania, U.S.
- Died: May 31, 1972 (aged 76); San Francisco, California, U.S.
- Education: Yale University; University of Pennsylvania Medical School
- Occupations: Physician; neurologist; psychosurgeon
- Known for: Popularizing lobotomy; Invention of transorbital lobotomy
- Children: Walter Jackson Freeman III
- Relatives: William Williams Keen (maternal grandfather)

Walter Jackson Freeman II (November 14, 1895 – May 31, 1972) was an American neurologist who claimed that he specialized in lobotomy. Freeman popularized the transorbital lobotomy, often referred to as the “ice-pick” lobotomy to make the procedure faster, cheaper, and accessible for use in overcrowded psychiatric hospitals, where there were often no operating rooms, surgeons, or anesthesia and limited budgets. The transorbital approach involved placing an orbitoclast (an instrument resembling an ice pick) under the eyelid and against the top of the eye socket; a mallet was then used to drive the orbitoclast through the thin layer of bone and into the brain. Freeman's transorbital lobotomy method did not require a neurosurgeon and could be performed outside of an operating room, often by untrained psychiatrists without the use of anesthesia by using electroconvulsive therapy to induce seizure and unconsciousness. In 1947, Freeman's partner James W. Watts ended their partnership because Watts was disgusted by Freeman's modification of the lobotomy from a surgical operation into a simple "office" procedure.

Freeman and his procedure played a major role in popularizing lobotomy and spreading it around the world; he later traveled across the United States visiting mental institutions. After four decades Freeman had personally performed possibly as many as 4,000 lobotomies on patients as young as 12, despite having no surgical training. As many as 100 of his patients died of cerebral hemorrhage, and he was banned from performing surgery in 1967.

== Early years ==
Walter J. Freeman was born on November 14, 1895, and raised in Philadelphia, Pennsylvania, by his parents. Freeman's grandfather, William Williams Keen, was well known as a surgeon in the Civil War. His father was also a very successful doctor. Freeman attended Yale University beginning in 1912, and graduated in 1916. He then moved on to study neurology at the University of Pennsylvania Medical School. While attending medical school, he studied the work of William Spiller and idolized his groundbreaking work in the new field of the neurological sciences. Freeman applied for a coveted position working alongside Spiller in his home town of Philadelphia, but was rejected.

Shortly afterward, in 1924, Freeman relocated to Washington, D.C., and started practicing as the first neurologist in the city. Upon his arrival in Washington, Freeman began work directing laboratories at St. Elizabeths Hospital. Working at the hospital and witnessing the pain and distress suffered by the patients encouraged him to continue his education in the field. Freeman earned his PhD in neuropathology within the following few years and secured a position at George Washington University in Washington, D.C., as head of the neurology department.

In 1932, his mother died at the Philadelphia Orthopedic Hospital in Philadelphia.

== Medical practice ==
The first systematic attempt at human psychosurgery – performed in the 1880s–1890s – is commonly attributed to the Swiss psychiatrist Gottlieb Burckhardt. Burckhardt's experimental surgical forays were largely condemned at the time and in the subsequent decades psychosurgery was attempted only intermittently. On November 12, 1935, a new psychosurgery procedure was performed in Portugal under the direction of the neurologist and physician Egas Moniz. His new "leucotomy" procedure, intended to treat mental illness, took small corings of the patient's frontal lobes. Moniz became a mentor and idol for Freeman who modified the procedure and renamed it the "lobotomy". Instead of taking corings from the frontal lobes, Freeman's procedure severed the connection between the frontal lobes and the thalamus. Because Freeman was a neurologist and not a neurosurgeon, he enlisted the help of neurosurgeon James Watts.

One year after the first leucotomy, on September 14, 1936, Freeman directed Watts through the very first prefrontal lobotomy in the United States on housewife Alice Hood Hammatt of Topeka, Kansas, who suffered from anxiety, insomnia, and depression. By November, only two months after performing their first lobotomy surgery, Freeman and Watts had already worked on 20 cases including several follow-up operations. By 1942, the duo had performed over 200 lobotomy procedures and had published results claiming 63% of patients had improved, 23% were reported to be unchanged and 14% were worse after surgery. In his own retrospective published in 1957, Freeman himself tallied 625 prefrontal lobotomy patients operated upon between September 1936 and May 1948.

Freeman then "developed a transorbital approach" based on the work of an Italian doctor, Amarro Fiamberti, who operated on the brain through his patients' eye sockets, allowing him to access the brain without drilling through the skull. In 1937, Fiamberti, the medical director of a psychiatric institution in Varese, first devised the transorbital procedure whereby the frontal lobes were accessed through the eye sockets. After experimenting with novel ways of performing these brain surgeries, Freeman formulated a new procedure called the transorbital lobotomy. His new procedure allowed him to perform lobotomies without the use of anesthesia, because he used electroconvulsive therapy to induce seizure: "[Freeman] used a mallet to tap an orbitoclast (a slender rod shaped like an icepick) through the orbital roof. Following penetration of the orbital roof, Freeman would sweep the orbitoclast laterally to obliterate frontal lobe tissue. Additionally, he was able to perform the procedure in an office setting because he anesthetized patients with a portable electroshock machine." He performed the transorbital lobotomy surgery for the first time in Washington, D.C., on a housewife named Sallie Ellen Ionesco. In 1950, Walter Freeman's long-time partner James Watts left their practice and split from Freeman due to his opposition to the transorbital lobotomy. In his 1957 retrospective, Freeman tallied 628 patients operated upon between 1946 and 1954.

Freeman travelled cross the country visiting mental institutions, performing lobotomies and spreading his views and methods to institution staff. He travelled in a customised camper van dubbed the "lobotomobile". Most of these operations Freeman performed for free as demonstrations. After four decades Freeman had personally performed possibly as many as 4,000 lobotomy surgeries in 23 states, of which 2,500 used his ice-pick procedure, despite the fact that he had no formal surgical training.

Freeman's use of lobotomy had a number of documented failures and ethical lapses. A well known case was the prefrontal lobotomy performed with Watts on Rosemary Kennedy which left her permanently disabled. A memoir written by former patient Howard Dully, called My Lobotomy, documented his experiences with Freeman and his long recovery after undergoing a transorbital lobotomy at 12 years of age.

Freeman usually wore neither gloves nor mask during these procedures. His patients often had to be retaught how to eat and use the bathroom. Relapses were common, some never recovered, and about 15% died from the procedure. In 1951, one patient at Iowa's Cherokee Mental Health Institute died when Freeman stopped and stepped back to take a photo of the patient with the leucotome, as was his usual practice, and the surgical instrument accidentally penetrated too far into the patient's brain.

Freeman often stayed in contact with his former patients and his families, and would check on their condition during his trips. In a 1957 retrospective of his work, Freeman boasted that, "The receipt of a wedding or a pink or blue baby card from a former patient arouses a certain pleasurable reaction in the recipient." At 57 years old, Freeman retired from his position at George Washington University and opened up a modest practice in California.

In February 1967, Freeman performed his final surgery on Helen Mortensen, a long-term patient who was receiving her third lobotomy from Freeman. She died of a cerebral hemorrhage, as had as many as 100 of his other patients, and he was finally banned from performing surgery.

He continued to be published in peer-reviewed journals including the American Journal of Psychiatry and British Journal of Psychiatry through the 1960s and 1970s. In 1972 he lamented the growing use of antipsychotic medications for schizophrenia, contending that lobotomy was more effective at reducing antisocial behavior in patients.

An extensive collection of Freeman's papers were donated to The George Washington University in 1980. The collection largely deals with the work that Freeman and James W. Watts did on psychosurgery over the course of their medical careers. The collection is currently under the care of GWU's Special Collections Research Center, located in the Estelle and Melvin Gelman Library.

Freeman was known for his eccentricities and he complemented his theatrical approach to demonstrating surgery by sporting a cane, goatee, and narrow-brimmed hat.

== Death ==
Freeman died of complications arising from an operation for cancer on May 31, 1972.

He was survived by four sons. The eldest, Walter III, became a professor of neurobiology at the University of California, Berkeley.

== Contributions to psychiatry ==
Walter Freeman nominated his mentor António Egas Moniz for a Nobel Prize, and in 1949 Moniz won the Nobel Prize in Physiology and Medicine. He pioneered and helped open up the psychiatric world to the idea of what would become psychosurgery. At the time, it was seen as a possible treatment for severe mental illness, but "within a few years, lobotomy was labeled one of the most barbaric mistakes of modern medicine." He also helped to demonstrate the idea that mental events have a physiological basis. Despite his interest in the mind, Freeman was "uninterested in animal experiments or understanding what was happening in the brain". Freeman was also co-founder and president of the American Board of Psychiatry and Neurology from 1946 to 1947 and a contributor and member of the American Psychiatric Association.

== Legacy in popular culture ==
Six years after his death, William Arnold's bestselling 1978 memoir Shadowland speculated that Freeman might have secretly given the ex-film star Frances Farmer a transorbital lobotomy while she was committed to the violent ward of a public mental institution in Washington State which he visited twice to experiment with the procedure. Frances, the 1982 film version of that book, depicted a Freeman-like psychosurgeon actually performing the operation on Farmer; and Martin Scorsese's 2010 thriller Shutter Island, seemingly inspired by the earlier film, also used the transorbital lobotomy and a Freeman-style doctor as an element of cinematic horror.

Joyce Carol Oates's 1995 novel Zombie includes a verbatim extract of Freeman and Watts's 1942 treatise Psychosurgery describing leucotomy. The antihero Quentin reads this passage and similar descriptions of lobotomy. Fantasizing about a zombified sexual partner, Quentin copies Freeman's icepick technique on several victims. While Jeffrey Dahmer was Oates's inspiration for the character of Quentin, Dahmer did not use Freeman's technique; Dahmer instead drilled into his victims' skulls and poured acid.

Both Jack El-Hai's 2005 book The Lobotomist and the 2008 PBS documentary adapted from it explored Freeman in more balanced depth but further presented him as an arrogant and irresponsible "maverick" whose chief contribution to science was a medical atrocity. Another negative account of Freeman's career appeared Sam Kean's 2021 popular science book, The Icepick Doctor: Murder, Fraud, Sabotage, Piracy, and Other Dastardly Deeds Perpetrated in the Name of Science.

== Works ==
- Freeman, Walter; Watts, James W. (1942), Prefrontal lobotomy in the treatment of mental disorders, Psychological Cinema Register, archived from the original on 2026-07-23 – via United States National Library of Medicine
- Freeman, Walter; Watts, James W.; Hunt, Thelma (1942). Psychosurgery: Intelligence, Emotion and Social Behavior Following Prefrontal Lobotomy for Mental Disorder. Springfield, Illinois: Charles C. Thomas.
- Freeman, Walter; Watts, JamesW (1946-06-29). "Pain of Organic Disease Relieved by Prefrontal Lobotomy". The Lancet. 247 (6409): 953–955. doi:10.1016/S0140-6736(46)91713-8. ISSN 0140-6736. PMID 20990051.
- Freeman, Walter; Watts, James W. (1947). "Retrograde degeneration of the thalamus following prefrontal lobotomy". Journal of Comparative Neurology. 86 (1): 65–93. doi:10.1002/cne.900860104. ISSN 1096-9861. PMID 20285735.
- Freeman, Walter (1948-09-04). "Transorbital Leucotomy". The Lancet. 252 (6523): 371–373. doi:10.1016/S0140-6736(48)90947-7. ISSN 0140-6736. PMID 18881546.
- Freeman, Walter (April 1949). "Transorbital Lobotomy". American Journal of Psychiatry. 105 (10): 734–740. doi:10.1176/ajp.105.10.734. ISSN 0002-953X. PMID 18114324.
- FREEMAN, WALTER (July 1954). "Frontal Lobes and Schizophrenia. Second Lobotomy Project of Boston Psychopathic Hospital". American Journal of Psychiatry. 111: 70–a. doi:10.1176/ajp.111.1.70-a.
- FREEMAN, WALTER (January 1956). "Psychosurgery". American Journal of Psychiatry. 112 (7): 529–531. doi:10.1176/ajp.112.7.529. PMID 13283138.
- FREEMAN, WALTER (March 1956). "Macroscopical Investigations of Twenty-Nine Brains Subjected to Frontal Leucotomy, with Some Observations on Clinico-pathological Correlations". American Journal of Psychiatry. 112 (9): 763. doi:10.1176/ajp.112.9.763.
- CHENG, SYLVIA; TAIT, H. SINCLAIR; FREEMAN, WALTER (July 1956). "Transorbital lobotomy versus electroconvulsive therapy in the treatment of mentally ill tuberculous patients". American Journal of Psychiatry. 113: 32–35. doi:10.1176/ajp.113.1.32. PMID 13327068.
- FREEMAN, WALTER (April 1957). "Frontal lobotomy 1936-1956 a follow-up study of 3000 patients from one to twenty years". American Journal of Psychiatry. 113 (10): 877–886. doi:10.1176/ajp.113.10.877. PMID 13402981.
- Freeman, Walter (1967). "Psychiatrists Who Kill Themselves: A Study in Suicide". American Journal of Psychiatry. 124 (6): 846–847. doi:10.1176/ajp.124.6.846. PMID 6061273.
- Freeman, Walter (December 1971). "Frontal Lobotomy in Early Schizophrenia Long Follow-up in 415 Cases". The British Journal of Psychiatry. 119 (553): 621–624. doi:10.1192/bjp.119.553.621. ISSN 0007-1250. PMID 5143660.
- Freeman, W. (April 1972). "Lobotomy in limbo?". The American Journal of Psychiatry. 128 (10): 1315–1316. doi:10.1176/ajp.128.10.1315. ISSN 0002-953X. PMID 5013753.
