= Bilateral cingulotomy =

Neurosurgical procedure for treating depression, OCD, and chronic pain

- ICD-9-CM: 01.32

Bilateral cingulotomy is a form of psychosurgery, introduced in 1948 as an alternative to lobotomy. Today, it is mainly used in the treatment of depression and obsessive-compulsive disorder. In the early years of the twenty-first century, it was used in Russia to treat addiction. It is also used in the treatment of chronic pain. The objective of this procedure is the severing of the supracallosal fibres of the cingulum bundle, which pass through the anterior cingulate gyrus.

== History ==
Cingulotomy was introduced in the 1940s as an alternative to standard pre-frontal leucotomy/lobotomy in the hope of alleviating symptoms of mental illness whilst reducing the undesirable effects of the standard operation (personality changes, etc.). It was suggested by American physiologist John Farquhar Fulton who, at a meeting of the Society of British Neurosurgeons in 1947, said "were it feasible, cingulotomy in man would seem an appropriate place for limited leucotomy". This was derived from the hypothesis of James Papez who thought that the cingulum was a major component of an anatomic circuit believed to play a significant role in emotion. The first reports of the use of cingulotomy on psychiatric patients came from J le Beau in Paris, Hugh Cairns in Oxford, and Kenneth Livingston in Oregon.

== Target ==
Bilateral cingulotomy targets the anterior cingulate cortex, which is a part of the limbic system. This system is responsible for the integration of feelings and emotion in the human cortex. It consists of the cingulate gyrus, parahippocampal gyrus, amygdala, and the hippocampal formation.

Studies in patients who were subject to bilateral cingulotomy, involving fMRI analyses, showed that the anterior cingulate cortex has a key role in cognitive control and is highly likely to be involved in the control of attentional response, whereas the dorsal part of that region of the brain was not identified to be involved in such a process, although this is still under dispute. The function of the dorsal part of the cingulate cortex was connected to the sorting out and processing of conflicting information signals. In addition, neuroimaging studies also indicated that the anterior cingulate cortex participates in the modulation of cortical regions that are of higher order, as well as sensory processing areas.

These findings have also been confirmed by stereotactic microelectrode analysis of single cortical neurons in a study, which involved nine patients undergoing bilateral cingulotomy. The study investigated the effect of performing attention demanding tasks on the activity of 36 neurons located in the anterior cingulate cortex. Upon analyzing the results of the study, it was concluded that the anterior cingulate cortex is indeed involved in the modification of cognitive tasks that require attention, based on the fact that there was a change in the basal firing rate of neurons in that region during simulation of such tasks.

Neuroimaging also uncovered different sub-regions in the anterior cingulate cortex itself, based on their function. These studies showed that the caudal part of the anterior cingulate cortex plays a more important function in cognitive activities that involve attention, salience, interference and response competition. These results, combined with electrophysiological investigation of the function of neurons in the anterior cingulate cortex, have provided insights that can be used in the improvement of cingulotomy performed on patients treated for obsessive–compulsive disorder (OCD). The basis behind this idea is the fact that a variation of certain tasks, emotional Stroop tasks (ES), which have been particularly identified as exerting effects in OCD patients, activate neurons in the more rostral part of the anterior cingulate cortex. Thus, theoretically, if bilateral cingulotomy is performed in such a patient in the rostral anterior cingulate cortex, better results should be obtained.

Moreover, OCD has been associated with a malformation of the basal ganglia. The function of this part of the human brain has been mapped to be composed of fiber tracks associated with numerous parallel cortico-striato-thalamocortical circuits (CSTC), which are involved in sensorimotor, motor, oculomotor as well as the cognitive processes that are manifested by the limbic system. This pathway involves GABAergic inhibitory projections that serve as one of the means of communication between the different structures involved. It has been hypothesized that some forms of OCD are a result of disinhibition of one or several of the circuits that operate in the CSTC. This is also indicated by a finding that showed a significant decrease in intracortical inhibition in OCD patients. Thus, lesions in the anterior cingulate cortex might contribute to the lessening of the disinhibition effect. This hypothesis has been confirmed by another study, which assessed the cortical inhibitory and excitatory mechanisms in OCD. The study measured the excitability of the motor cortex, as well as intracortical inhibition in OCD patients and a control group of healthy individuals. The results showed a significant decrease in intracortical inhibition, which resulted in a slowdown of interstimulus intervals by 3 ms. In addition to its proximity to and association with the limbic system and the amygdala in particular, which plays a key role in emotional experience, the anterior cingulate cortex shares afferent and efferent pathways with a number of thalamic nuclei as well as the posterior cingulate and part of some parietal, frontal and supplementary motor cortex.

Functional MRI analyses of the anterior cingulate cortex have also led to the introduction of bilateral cingulotomy for the treatment of chronic pain. Such application was introduced since the anterior cingulate cortex has been found to be related to the processing of nociceptive information input. In particular, the role of the anterior cingulate cortex is in the interpretation of how a stimulus affects a person rather than its actual physical intensity.

== Procedure ==
A book published in 1992 described how the operation was carried out at that time. In most cases the procedure started with the medical team taking a number of CT scan X-ray images of the brain of the patient. This step ensured that the exact target, the cingulate cortex, was mapped out, so that the surgeon could identify it. Burr holes were then created in the patient's skull using a drill. Lesions at the targeted tissue were made with the help of fine electrodes inserted at the right angle into the subject's brain based on plotting charts and making sure important arteries and blood vessels were intact. The electrode was placed in a probe, or a holder, with only its tip projecting. Upon the correct insertion of the holder into the brain tissue, air was injected and more scan images were taken. Then, after the medical team had made sure they were on the right track, the tip of the electrode was advanced to the plane of the cingulate where it was heated to 75–90 °C (167–194 °F). Once the first lesion was created it served as a center around which several other lesions were created. In order to confirm whether lesions are made at the right place, scan images were taken postoperatively and analyzed.

Recent technological advances, however, have made bilateral cingulotomy a more precise operation. For example, nowadays a neurosurgical team that performs the procedure can use an MRI to identify the location of the anterior and posterior commissures. This approach allows neurosurgeons to obtain a number of coronal images, which are then used to calculate the stereotactic coordinates of the target in the anterior cingulate cortex, where lesions need to be made. Moreover, the MRI enables more precise differentiation of the cell composition, and thus easily permits the identification of the grey matter in that region. This can then be further confirmed with the help of microelectrode recordings.

== Side effects ==
Patients usually recover from this operation over a period of four days. However, there are cases of subjects being released from hospital after as little as 48 hours after the operation. The mild shorter postoperative complications that are most commonly related to bilateral cingulotomy are typical of head interventions and include but are not limited to nausea, vomiting, and headaches. However, in some cases, patients exhibit seizures that sometimes appear up to two months after the surgical intervention. It has been questioned whether this is relevant and can be attributed to cingulotomy because such seizures were observed in patients who already had a history of this condition.

== Case studies ==
A 2002 study conducted at the Massachusetts General Hospital analyzed the outcome of bilateral cingulotomy in 44 patients for the treatment of OCD in the period between 1965 and 1986. Patients were followed up over a long term and evaluated based on several criteria: 1) how many of them were responders (Note: Here, "responder" refers to a clinical trial patient who saw a 35% or greater reduction in their Yale–Brown Obsessive Compulsive Scale metric as well as self-reported OCD symptoms, depression, or anxiety as either "moderately" or "much better" as a result of a cingulotomy. The study also considers "partial responders", or individuals who saw clinical noted improvement in just one metric or were able to attribute their health outcomes to another procedure or intervention.) after a period of six months, 2) how many cingulotomies a patient had undergone before the examination of the effectiveness of the procedure, 3) whether the patient showed any significant change after the most recent procedure, and 4) what the side effects related to the procedure were.

The follow-up of the patients produced contradictory results, which indicated that bilateral cingulotomy is not the optimal treatment for OCD. Of the 44 patients, only 32% both fit the "responder" criteria and showed significant improvement compared to the other subjects. Another 14% exhibited some signs of improvement. Multiple cingulotomies correlated with a higher likelihood of continuing to respond to follow-up inquiries (6% more often fit the full "responder" criteria, 11% more often fit the partial "responder" criteria). However, the side effects associated with the procedure were numerous. Among the complaints that patients had after the surgery were apathy and deficits in memory, although these were rarely reported. In addition, some subjects complained of some form of urinary disturbance, ranging from urinary retention to incontinence. Hydrocephalus (2%) and seizures (2%) were also observed.

Bilateral cingulotomy has also been used in the treatment of chronic refractory pain. A systematic review of 11 studies encompassing 224 patients found that anterior cingulotomy led to significant pain relief in greater than 60% of patients post-operatively as well as at one year following the procedure. Of the included studies, one clinical study investigated the effect of bilateral cingulotomy for the treatment of refractory chronic pain. In this case, 23 patients who were subject to 28 cingulotomies in total were followed up. The analyses aimed at determining how much the pain of each individual was affected after the procedure with the help of a questionnaire. In addition, the examiners tried to evaluate the impacts on social and family relations of the participants in the study. Based on the data obtained, cingulotomy for treatment of chronic pain showed promising results. 72% reported improvement in the level of pain experienced, and 50% indicated that they no longer required painkillers after cingulotomy. More than half of the patients also claimed that the surgical procedure was beneficial and contributed to the improvement of their social interactions.

== See also ==
- Lobotomy
- Bioethics and medical ethics
- Frontal lobe disorder
- Frontal lobe injury
- Psychosurgery
- History of psychosurgery in the United Kingdom
