= Erik Essen-Möller =

Swedish psychiatric geneticist

Erik Essen-Möller (February 4, 1901 – November 12, 1992) was a Swedish psychiatrist who served as Professor of Psychiatry at the University of Lund. He was one of the pioneers of research in the field of psychiatric genetics, along with Ernst Rüdin in Munich, Germany, Franz Kallmann in New York City, New York, United States, and Eliot Slater in London, England. Irving Gottesman described him as one of the "founding fathers of modern, scientific psychiatric genetics".
