= Atkinson Morley Hospital =

Coordinates: 51°25′04″N 0°14′15″W

- St George's University Hospitals NHS Foundation Trust
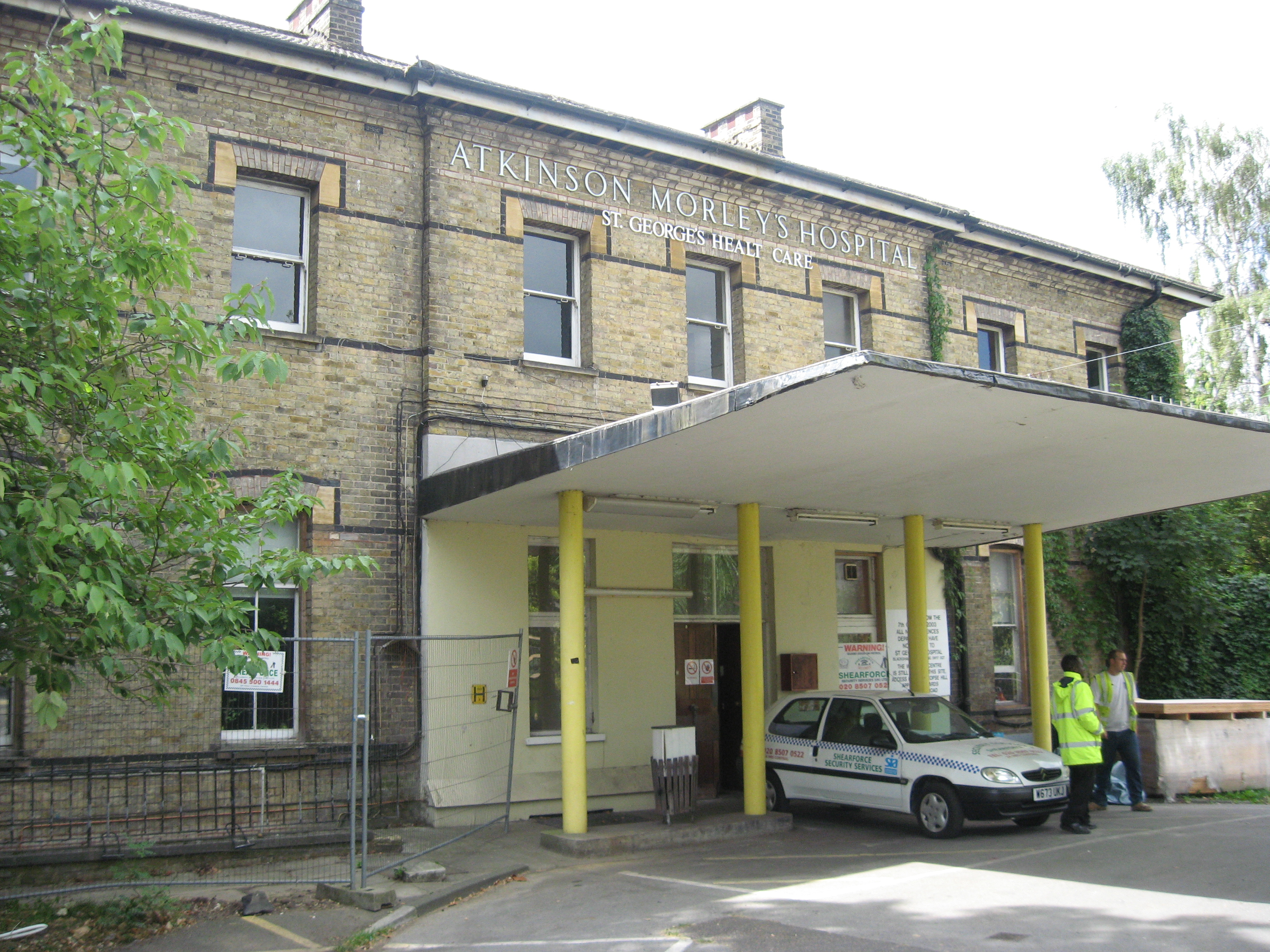
- Atkinson Morley Hospital

Geography
- Location: Copse Hill, England

Organisation
- Care system: NHS England
- Type: Neurosurgery
- Affiliated university: St George's, University of London

Services
- Emergency department: No

History
- Founded: 1869
- Closed: 2003

Links
- Website: www.stgeorges.nhs.uk
- Lists: Hospitals in England
- Other links: St George's University Hospitals NHS Foundation Trust

Atkinson Morley Hospital (AMH) was located at 31 Copse Hill near Wimbledon, southwest London, England from 1869 until 2003. Initially a convalescent hospital, it became one of the most advanced brain surgery centres in the world, and was involved in the development of the CT scanner. Following its closure, neuroscience services were relocated to the new Atkinson Morley Wing of St George's Hospital, Tooting.

== History ==
The hospital was opened in 1869 following a donation of £100,000 by Atkinson Morley, a wealthy hotelier and landowner, to St George's Hospital "for receiving, maintaining, and generally assisting convalescent poor patients". Morley had been a medical student at St George's Hospital circa 1800 when it was located at Hyde Park Corner. 28 acres (11 ha) of land from the Duke of Wellington's old estate in Wimbledon was bought and a building was constructed in the Second Empire style. It opened on 14 July 1869.

The hospital remained a convalescent home until 1939. During the Second World War, when the Bolingbroke and St. George's acted as emergency hospitals for war casualties, the Neurosurgery Unit was established at the AMH by the neurosurgeon Sir Wylie McKissock. He was by far the most prolific lobotomist in the country, performing lobotomies at Atkinson Morley and across the south of England.

As the Regional Neurosciences Unit for southwest London, the hospital even had its own helicopter landing facility. Next door was the Wolfson Neurorehabilitation Centre.

A form of lobotomy known as limbic leucotomy was developed in the early 1970s by surgeon Alan Richardson at Atkinson Morley Hospital. The operation combines stereotactic subcaudate tractotomy and cingulotomy, with up to 14 cryogenic lesions made in the brain. Limbic leucotomies continued to be performed at Atkinson Morley Hospital until 1999.

The hospital remained open until 2003 when neurology services were relocated to a purpose-built wing of the main St George's Hospital site, which had by then moved to Tooting. The Wolfson Neurorehabilitation Centre was closed in 2012 after providing a rehabilitation service to patients of the new Atkinson Morley Wing at St George's Hospital and throughout southwest London. The building and grounds were converted into apartments and renamed Wimbledon Hill Park.

== Development of the CT scanner ==
In 1967 an electronics engineer from EMI, Godfrey Hounsfield, visited consultant radiologist Jamie Ambrose to discuss a new method of using X-rays to image the brain. Although Hounsfield had been dismissed as a crank by a neuroradiologist at the National Hospital for Neurology and Neurosurgery, Ambrose and other staff thought the proposal was interesting. Ambrose gave him a bottled brain tumour sample to see if he could make good on his claim that "I can do better" than their state-of-the-art X-ray and ultrasound images. When Hounsfield returned five weeks later with a detailed image of the tumour, Ambrose was convinced and he encouraged the Department of Health to fund the building of a prototype scanner. Hospital staff were sworn to secrecy while the first tomographic scanner to produce computed tomographic images of a live patient's brain was constructed and tested.

On 1 October 1971 the first patient was scanned and the data sent off for analysis. The resulting images were examined by the hospital's neuroradiologists, neurologists and neurosurgeons who immediately appreciated their value. There was international media interest and hundreds of clinicians visited the hospital to see the new scanner. Hounsfield shared the 1979 Nobel Prize in Physiology or Medicine with the physicist Allan M. Cormack "for the development of computer assisted tomography".

== References and sources ==
Sources

- Gould, Terry; Uttley, David (2000). A History of the Atkinson Morley's Hospital 1869-1995. London: Athlone. ISBN 978-0-567-63304-0.
- Milward, Richard. (1989) Historic Wimbledon: Caesar's Camp to Centre Court. Wimbledon: Fielder's.
