= Wylie McKissock =

British neurosurgeon

Sir Wylie McKissock, OBE (27 October 1906 – 3 May 1994) was a British neurosurgeon. He set up the neurosurgical unit at the Atkinson Morley Hospital, was Britain's most prolific leucotomist (lobotomist), and president of the Society of British Neurological Surgeons.

McKissock was born in Staines, Surrey. His parents were Alexander Cathie McKissock and Rae Wylie. His father, originally from Lanarkshire, was a manager in a linoleum factory who wrote crime fiction under the name of Alan Graham and invented a machine for cutting sheets of material. McKissock went to the City of London School and studied medicine at King's College London and St George's Hospital Medical School in London, qualifying in 1930. His first positions were at St George's Hospital, Maida Vale Hospital for Nervous Diseases (where he began his neurosurgical career) and Great Ormond Street Hospital. In 1936 McKissock visited Stockholm to study Swedish neurosurgeon Herbert Olivecrona's work, and then spent a year (1937-1938) on a Rockefeller Foundation Fellowship in the United States and Canada. By this time he had a young family, having married Rachel Jones in 1934. The couple had two daughters and a son.

In 1939, at the outbreak of World War II, McKissock tried unsuccessfully to join the army as a neurosurgeon and instead was appointed to the neurosurgical unit at Leavesden Hospital. The unit later moved to the Atkinson Morley Hospital, Wimbledon, London, and for a time in 1944 was evacuated to Bath, Somerset. McKissock was appointed an OBE in 1946 for his neurosurgical work on casualties with brain injuries during the war. He became a consultant at St George's Hospital and was also given an appointment at the National Hospital for Neurology and Neurosurgery in Queen Square, London, which was merged with University College Hospital in the 1990s. Thus at the Atkinson Morley Hospital, which he was to run until his retirement in 1971, he operated on patients from St George's Hospital, Maida Vale Hospital, Great Ormond Street, Queen Square and University College Hospital, as well as accepting referrals from other hospitals.

While at the Atkinson Morley Hospital, McKissock developed an extensive practice of psychosurgery, travelling to psychiatric hospitals all over the south of England, Wales and the Midlands. In the 1940s he favoured the standard Freeman-Watts leucotomy where holes were drilled in the side of the head and an instrument swept through the white matter to sever connections between the frontal lobes and the deeper structures in the brain. Here he describes the Freeman-Watts leucotomy and the speed at which he operated:

"This is not a time-consuming operation. A competent team in a well-organised mental hospital can do four such operations in 2-2½ hours. The actual bilateral prefrontal leucotomy can be done by a properly trained neurosurgeon in six minutes and seldom take more than ten minutes."

In 1948, in an attempt to reduce the risks and damaging effects of leucotomy, he developed a technique of his own, the rostral leucotomy, where the frontal lobes were approached from the top of the head. He still used the standard Freeman-Watts technique on some patients. By the late 1950s, he had performed about 3,000 leucotomies.

In 1966, McKissock became president of the Society of British Neurological Surgeons. He was awarded a knighthood on his retirement in 1971, after which he went to live in Scotland. Following the death of his wife in 1992, Wylie relocated to Brighton to live with his eldest daughter.

== See also ==
- History of psychosurgery in the United Kingdom
