= Communication Disorders Quarterly =

- Discipline: Communication disorders
- Language: English
- Edited by: Judy Montgomery

Publication details
- Former names: Journal of Children's Communication Development, CDQA Journal of Childhood Communication Disorders
- History: 1976-present
- Publisher: SAGE Publications (United States)
- Frequency: Quarterly
- Impact factor: 0.66 (2017)

Standard abbreviations
- ISO 4: Commun. Disord. Q.

Indexing
- ISSN: 1525-7401 (print); 1538-4837 (web)
- LCCN: 99008820
- OCLC no.: 61168830

Links
- Journal homepage; Online archive

Communication Disorders Quarterly is a quarterly peer-reviewed academic journal that covers research on typical and atypical communication, from oral language development to literacy in clinical and educational settings. The editor-in-chief is Judy Montgomery (Chapman University). It was established in 1976 and is currently published by SAGE Publications in association with the Hammill Institute on Disabilities.

== Abstracting and indexing ==
Communications Disorders Quarterly is abstracted and indexed in:

- CINAHL
- Contents Pages in Education
- Educational Research Abstracts Online
- Linguistics and Language Behavior Abstracts
- PsycINFO
- Scopus

According to the Journal Citation Reports, its 2014 impact factor is 0.66, ranking it 63 out of 69 journals in the category Rehabilitation.
