= William Beecher Scoville =

American physician (1906–1984)

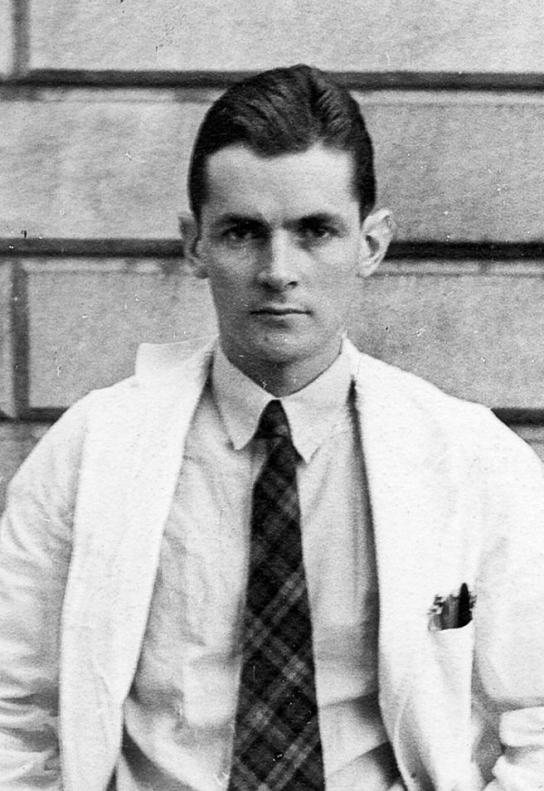
William Beecher Scoville

William Beecher Scoville (January 13, 1906 – February 25, 1984) was an American neurosurgeon at Hartford Hospital in Hartford, Connecticut. Scoville established the Department of Neurosurgery at Connecticut's Hartford Hospital in 1939. He performed surgery on Henry Gustav Molaison in 1953 to relieve epilepsy that damaged the hippocampus of both the right and left temporal lobes of Molaison's brain and left him with a memory disorder.

== Biography ==
Scoville was born in Philadelphia, Pennsylvania, on January 13, 1906. Although he had a strong interest in automobiles throughout his life, his father pushed William toward a career in medicine. After completing his undergraduate degree at Yale (B.A., 1928), he attended and graduated from the University of Pennsylvania School of Medicine in 1932. In 1941, he became board certified in neurosurgery. Also, in 1941 he started the first neurosurgical residency training program in Connecticut.

In 1953 Scoville offered Henry Gustav Molaison, the patient now widely known as H. M., a chance to cure Molaison's epilepsy through a pioneered experimental procedure. With the approval of the patient and his family, Scoville was to perform an experimental resection of several portions of the temporal lobes, a procedure which he had previously performed in psychotic patients. Scoville had a "hunch" that the hippocampus was responsible, and based on this erroneous guess, removed both of Molaison's hippocampi – sucking them out using a medical tool which comprises a cauterizing blade and suction vacuum, while the anesthetized but conscious Molaison sat in the operating chair. Later, the hippocampus became known to be crucial in the formation of memories – which is why Molaison was rendered unable to form new memories for the rest of his life. Scoville consulted with a leading Canadian surgeon, Wilder Penfield at McGill University in Montreal, who, with psychologist Brenda Milner, had previously reported on two other patients’ memory deficits. As a result of this work (her PhD thesis) Milner has become one of the most famous neuropsychologists in the world.

Scoville contributed to the development of the aneurysm clip. His modification was to place a coiled spring with an axis parallel to the plane of clip closure. Over the course of his life Scoville trained a total of 63 neurosurgeons, 46 from the U.S. and 17 foreign.

Scoville died in a car crash on February 25, 1984.

William Scoville' s grandson Luke Dittrich wrote a book about "Patient H.M." and his grandfather. In the book, in reference to Dr. Scoville removing both hippocampi without evidence they were the cause of H.M.'s epilepsy, the author quotes his grandfather as saying "I prefer action to thought, which is why I am a surgeon. I like to see results." (p. 214)
