= Gottlieb Burckhardt =

Swiss psychiatrist (1836–1907)

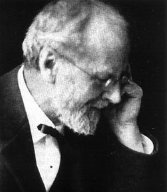
- Born: 24 December 1836; Basel, Switzerland
- Died: 6 February 1907 (aged 70); Basel, Switzerland
- Education: University of Basel; University of Göttingen; University of Berlin; M.D. (1860); habilitation in internal medicine (1862)
- Years active: 1860–1907
- Known for: The first physician to perform modern psychosurgery
- Medical career
- Profession: Physician
- Institutions: G.P., Basel (1860–1862); Physician, Waldau Psychiatric Clinic University of Bern (1875–1882); Privatdozent in Psychiatry and Neurology at the University of Berne (1876–1882); Medical Director of the Préfargier Asylum, Marin, Canton of Neuchâtel (1882–1896); Medical Director Sonnenhalde Clinic, Riehen (1900–1904); Consulting Physician Sonnenhalde Clinic, Riehen (1904–1907)
- Sub-specialties: Psychiatry, neurology
- Research: Epithelium of the urinary tract, psychosurgery, electrotherapy, aphasia, functional centers of the brain, traumatic hysteria, syphilis

Johann Gottlieb Burckhardt (24 December 1836 – 6 February 1907) was a Swiss psychiatrist and the medical director of a small mental hospital in the Swiss canton of Neuchâtel. He is commonly regarded as having performed the first modern psychosurgical operation. Born in Basel, Switzerland, he trained as doctor at the Universities of Basel, Göttingen and Berlin, receiving his medical doctorate in 1860. In the same year he took up a teaching post in the University of Basel and established a private practice in his hometown. He married in 1863 but the following year he was diagnosed with tuberculosis and gave up his practice and relocated to a region south of the Pyrenees in search of a cure. By 1866 he had made a full recovery and returned to Basel with the intention of devoting himself to the study of nervous diseases and their treatment. In 1875, he attained a post at the Waldau University Psychiatric Clinic in Bern, and from 1876 he lectured on mental diseases at the University of Bern. Beginning in this period, he published widely on his psychiatric and neurological research findings in the medical press, developing the thesis that mental illnesses had their origins in specific regions of the brain.

In 1882, he was appointed the medical director of a small, modern, and privately run psychiatric clinic at Marin, in the canton of Neuchâtel, where he was provided with a laboratory to continue his research. In 1888, he pioneered modern psychosurgery when he excised various brain regions from six psychiatric patients under his care. Aimed at relieving symptoms rather than effecting a cure, the theoretical basis of the procedure rested on his belief that psychiatric illnesses were the result of specific brain lesions. He reported the results at a Berlin medical conference in 1889, but the reception of his medical peers was decidedly negative and he was ridiculed. Burckhardt subsequently discontinued his research activities. Following the death of his wife in 1896, Burckhardt returned to Basel, where he established a sanatorium in 1900. He died seven years later from pneumonia.

== Early life and education ==
Gottlieb Burckhardt was born on 24 December 1836 into a well-known family, the Burckhardt, living in the Swiss city of Basel. His father, August Burckhardt (1809–1894), was a physician. His mother was Katharina Jacot (1810–1843) from Montbéliard in France. Burckhardt's parents were married in 1833 and his mother gave birth to seven children prior to her death in 1843. Gottlieb Burckhardt was the third eldest child. (Note: The children from this marriage were: Rudolf Burckhardt (1833–1862), a doctor of philosophy; August Burckhardt (1835–1916); Johann Gottlieb Burckhardt (1836–1907); Susanna Emilia Burckhardt (1838–1918); Anna Barbara Burckhardt (1839–1917); Maria Elisabeth Burckhardt (1841–1904); and Jakob Heinrich Burckhardt (1842–1915).) In 1844 his father married Henrietta Maria Dick (1813–1871). She had five pregnancies and three surviving children. (Note: The children from this marriage were: Karl Burckhardt (1845–1908), an engineer; William Friedrich Burckhardt (1851–1914), a musician; and Albrecht Eduard Burckhardt (1853–1921), a physician and professor of hygiene.) Burckhardt attended secondary school in Basel. His medical studies were conducted at the Universities of at Basel, Göttingen and Berlin. In 1860 he was conferred with a doctorate in medicine from the University of Basel. His doctoral thesis was on the epithelium of the urinary tract. As a student, he was described as popular, outgoing and musically talented.

== Career ==
=== Early career, 1860–1888 ===
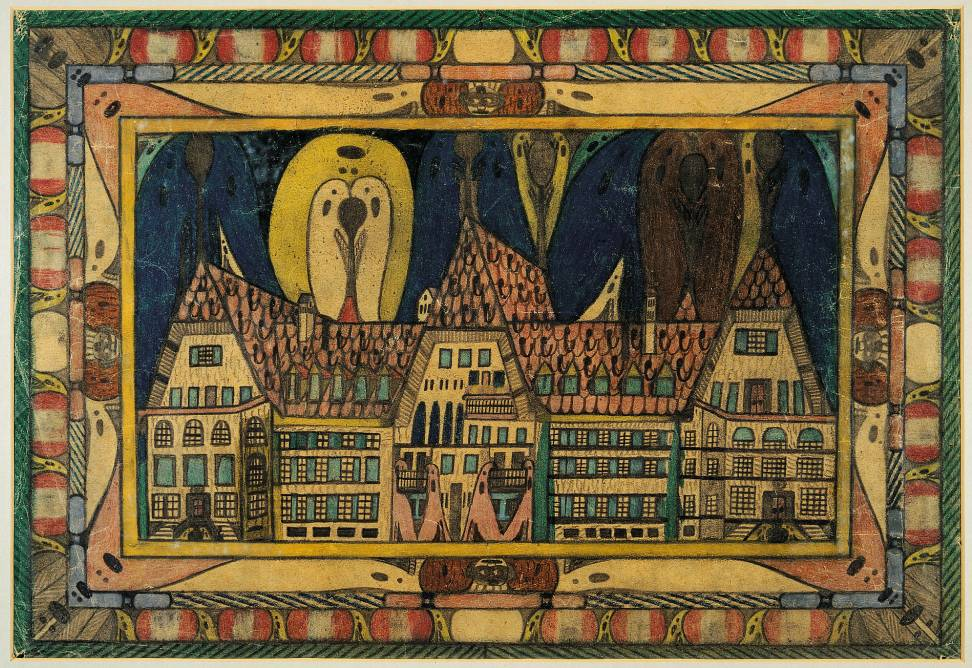
Painting of the Waldau Clinic, Berne (1921) by Adolf Wölfli who was a patient there from 1895 until his death in 1930. Burckhardt worked as physician at the Waldau from 1873 until 1882.

By 1860 Burckhardt had established a private medical practice in Basel. In 1862 he completed a post-doctoral habilitation in internal medicine and was granted the position of Privatdozent at the University of Basel. The following year he married Elisabeth Heusler (1840–1896) and they had eight children together. (Note: These were: Helena K. Burckhardt (1864–1942); August Burckhardt (1867–1924), President of the Swiss National Bank; Otto Burckhardt (1868–1956), a Professor of Gynaecology; Walter Burckhardt (1871–1939), a Professor of International and Constitutional Law at the University of Berne and a member of the Hague Tribunal; Wilhelm Burckhardt (1873–1895); Luise M. Burckhardt (1875–1945); Paul Eduard Burckhardt (1884–1976), a doctor of philosophy and a missionary.) In 1864, due to a diagnosis of pulmonary tuberculosis, Burckhardt was forced to give up his practice and he relocated to a southern locale near the Pyrenees. He recovered fully and published a study of climatic conditions in the region.

In 1866 Burckhardt returned to Basel and resolved to study the diseases of the nervous system and their treatment with the new electrotherapies. His interest in this field had been fostered by Karl Ewald Hasse, a noted physician and friend of the Burckhardt family. In 1873 he was elected to the presidency of the Basel Medical Society. Two years later, in 1875, he received a post as a physician to the Waldau Psychiatric University Clinic in Berne; (Note: There is confusion in the secondary sources as to whether Burckhardt took up this post in 1873 or 1875. Ultimately these dates are derived from two obituary notices for Burckhardt. In the English language literature which deals with this topic 1873 has generally been the preferred date. This has been the one advanced by Berrios in a variety of texts. Stone cites the same sources as Berrios, namely the two obituary notices, yet he favours 1875 as the correct year. However, Stone's treatment of Burckhardt's career and general biography is certainly the more detailed, precise and recent than that of Berrios. For these reasons 1875 has been the date preferred in this article.) later that year he also published Die physiologische Diagnostik der Nervenkrankheiten (Physiological Diagnostics of Nervous Diseases), a 284-page monograph which detailed the results of his research on the use of electrotherapy for nervous disorders and the conductivity of the nervous system.

In 1876 he became a Privatdozent at the University of Bern, where he lectured on nervous and mental diseases. This marks a highly productive period in his career as he became a regular contributor to several medical publications including the Swiss periodical Korrespondenzblatt für Schweizer Ärtze and produced articles on a variety of psychiatric and neurological topics. In 1877 he published a historical treatment of psychiatric and psychological theories of the functional regions of the brain. In this article he proposed that there were "cortical dispersion centres" which were "rooted in physiology and anatomy in the brain" and that these played a crucial role in the development of mental illness. Burckhardt drew inspiration for his hypothesis from recent advances which had shown the localisation of language faculties in the brain and he believed that mental diseases were also traceable to specific cortical centres. In the application of internal medicine to psychiatry, his research activities extended to an exploration of the relationship between mental illness and bodily temperature, blood pressure and pulse. In 1881 he published on the relationship between cerebral blood flow and oxygen consumption and posited a connection between cerebral oxygen deprivation, pathological brain circulation and mental illness. While at Bern he also successfully submitted articles on the histological preparation of brain cells, sensory aphasia ("word deafness"), the anatomy of the brain and cerebral localisation and forensic psychiatry. From 1881 until his departure from the Waldau Clinic in 1882, Eugen Bleuler, who coined the term schizophrenia in 1908, served as his medical intern.

In August 1882 Burckhardt was appointed as the medical director of the Préfargier, a small but modern psychiatric clinic in Marin in the Swiss Canton of Neuchâtel. Prior to his arrival a laboratory was constructed at the clinic so that Burckhardt could continue his research into neuroanatomy and psychophysiology. In February 1884 he presented at the Préfargier asylum his findings on the heredity and the surface configuration of the brain. He continued to publish on psychiatric and neurological topics such as cerebral vascular movements, brain tumours and optic chiasm, traumatic hysteria, and writing disorders.

=== Psychosurgery, 1888–1891 ===
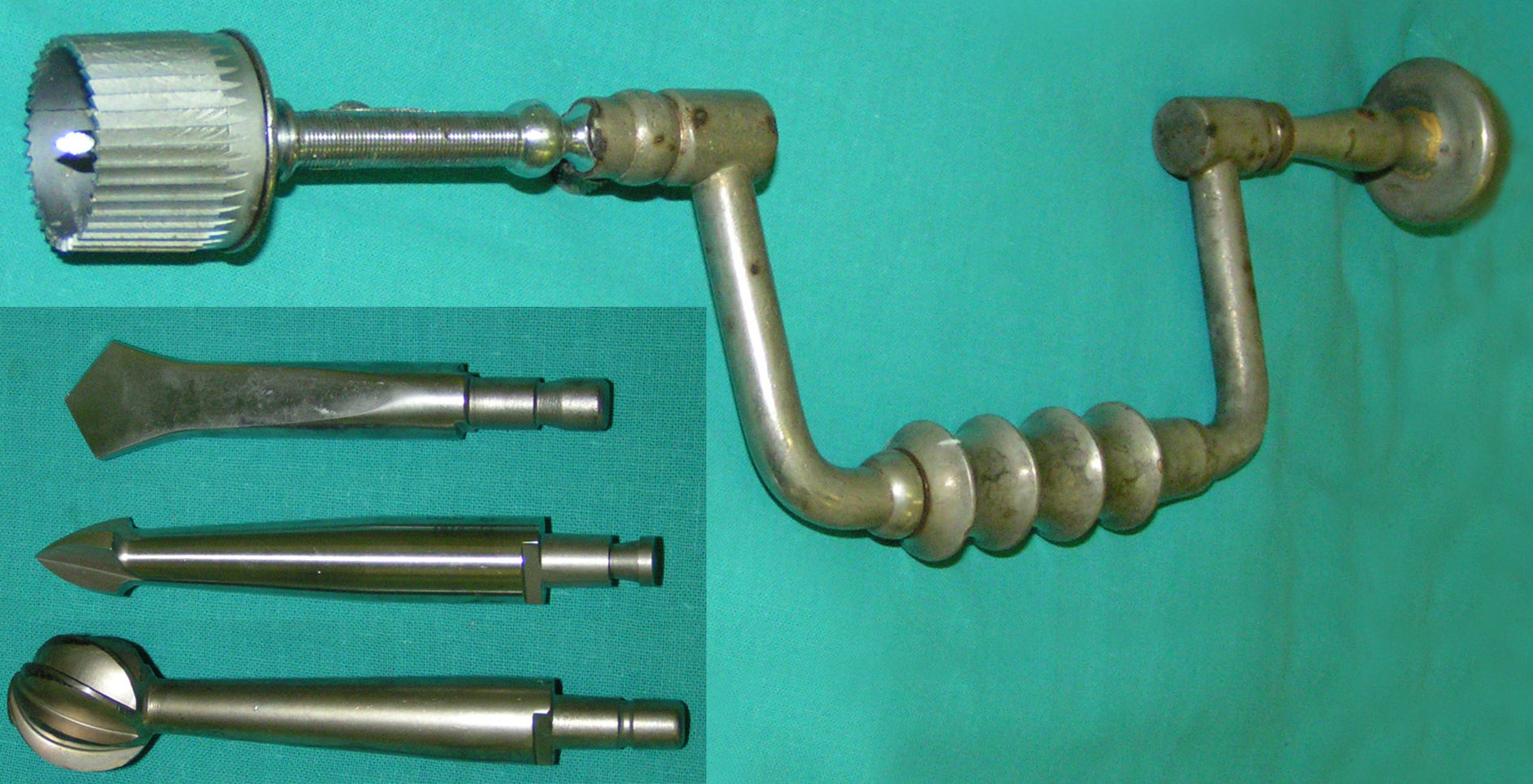
Nineteenth-century trephination set similar to that employed by Burckhardt

In December 1888 Burckhardt, who had little experience of surgery, performed what are commonly regarded as the first series of modern psychosurgical operations. (Note: Multiple sources credit Burckhardt with having performed the first psychosurgical procedure. However, Kotowicz notes a difference, irregularly observed, among medical historians and medical practitioners in their location of the origin of psychosurgery. The latter group, he contends, tend to favour beginning the narrative with Burckhardt whilst the former group favour starting with Moniz. In the context of early psychosurgery, Berrios unusually also refers to the operations performed in 1889 by a surgeon, Harrison Cripps, at the behest of the British psychiatrist Thomas Claye Shaw in which fluid was drawn from the brain of a patient diagnosed with general paralysis of the insane. While the purpose of the operation was aimed towards the alleviation of mental symptoms attendant on the condition the procedure did not aim to interfere directly with brain tissue and therefore it has been excluded from most conventional accounts of psychosurgery.) He operated on six patients under his care, two women and four men aged between 26 and 51 whose condition was deemed to be intractable. Their diagnoses were, variously, one of chronic mania, one of primary dementia and four of primäre Verrücktheit (primary paranoid psychosis). (Note: Otherwise known as "paranoia" or "primary insanity". As a diagnostic category the Berlin psychiatrist Wilhelm Sander was responsible for its reintroduction in the late 1860s and Richard von Krafft-Ebing for its popularisation as originäre Paranoia in the early 1890s. Krafft-Ebing's disease concept referred to a mental illness that was hereditary in nature, began to manifest at puberty and developed into psychosis with delusional and hallucinatory features.) This latter diagnosis was, according to the clinician-historian German E. Berrios, "a clinical category that (anachronistically) should be considered as tantamount to schizophrenia". Burckhardt's case notes recorded that the patients all exhibited serious psychiatric symptoms such as auditory hallucinations, paranoid delusions, aggression, excitement and violence. The operations excised regions of the cerebral cortex, specifically removing sections of the frontal, temporal, and temporoparietal lobes. The results were not overly encouraging as one patient died five days after the operation after experiencing epileptic convulsions, one improved but later died by suicide, another two showed no change, and the last two patients became "quieter". Complications consequent to the procedure included epilepsy (in two patients), motor weakness, "word deafness" and sensory aphasia. Only two patients are recorded as having no complications.

The theoretical basis of Burckhardt's action rested on three propositions. The first was that mental illness had a physical basis and that disordered minds were merely a reflection of disordered brains. Next, the associationist viewpoint of nerve functioning which conceived the nervous system as operating according to the following threefold division of labor: an input (or sensory or afferent) system, a connecting system which processed information and an output (or efferent or motor) system. The final assumption of Buckhardt's was that the brain was modular which meant that each mental module or mental faculty could be linked to a specific location in the brain. In accordance with such a viewpoint, Buckhardt postulated that lesions in specific areas of the brain might impact behavior in a specific manner. In other words, he thought that by cutting the connecting system, or second association state of brain's system of communication troubling symptoms might be alleviated without compromising either the nervous system's input or output systems. The procedure was aimed at relieving symptoms, not at curing a given mental disease. Thus, he wrote in 1891:

[I]f excitation and impulsive behaviour are due to the fact that from the sensory surfaces excitations abnormal in quality, quantity and intensity do arise, and do act on the motor surfaces, then an improvement could be obtained by creating an obstacle between the two surfaces. The extirpation of the motor or the sensory zone would expose us to the risk of grave functional disturbances and to technical difficulties. It would be more advantageous to practice the excision of a strip of cortex behind and on both sides of the motor zone creating thus a kind of ditch in the temporal lobe.

Burckhardt attended the Berlin Medical Conference of 1889, which was also attended by such heavyweight psychiatrists as Victor Horsley, Valentin Magnan and Emil Kraepelin, and presented a paper on his brain operations. While his findings were subsequently widely reported in the psychiatric literature, the reviews were unremittingly negative and there was much ill ease generated by the surgical procedures he had performed. He also published the results of the procedure in 1891 in the periodical Allgemeine Zeitschrift für Psychiatrie und psychischgerichtliche Medicin in an article entitled 'Uber Rindenexcisionen, als Beitrag zur operativen Therapie der Psychosen' ('Concerning cortical excision, as a contribution to the surgical treatment of psychosis'). This paper was his last significant medical publication. Kraepelin, writing in 1893, was scathing of Burckhardt's attempts, and stated that "he [Burckhardt] suggested that restless patients could be pacified by scratching away the cerebral cortex." While Giuseppe Seppilli, an Italian professor of neuropsychiatry, remarked in 1891 that Burckhardt's view of the brain as modular did not "fit in well with the view held by most [experts] that the psychoses reflect a diffuse pathology of the cerebral cortex and [ran counter to] the conception of the psyche as a unitary entity".

Burckhardt wrote in 1891 that "Doctors are different by nature. One kind adheres to the old principle: first, do no harm (primum non nocere); the other one says: it is better to do something than do nothing (melius anceps remedium quam nullum). I certainly belong to the second category". The French psychiatrist Armand Semelaigne responded that "an absence of treatment was better than a bad treatment". After the publication of his impressive 81 page monograph on the subject in 1891, Burckhardt ended his research and practice of psychosurgery due to the ridicule he received from his colleagues over the methods he had employed.

Commenting on his monograph in 1891 the British psychiatrist William Ireland concluded:

Dr. Burckhardt has a firm faith in the view that the mind is made up of a number of faculties, holding their seats in distinct portions of the brain. Where excess or irregularity of function occurs he seeks to check it by ablation of a portion of the irritated centres. He defends himself from the criticisms which are sure to be directed against his bold treatment by showing the desperate character of the prognosis of the patients upon whom the operations were performed ...

Ireland doubted that any English psychiatrist would have the "hardihood" to follow the path taken by Burckhardt.

=== Later career and death, 1891–1907 ===
Following the death of his wife and one of his sons, Burckhardt left his position at the Préfargier in 1896 and returned to Basel with the intention of setting up a sanatorium. This plan came to fruition in 1900 when the Sonnenhalde Clinic was opened in Riehen near Basel. Burckhardt served as the clinic's medical director from 1900 until 1904 and he remained a physician at the facility until his death from pneumonia on 6 February 1907. He was a marginal figure within the professional community of his psychiatric peers, attending few medical symposia and conferences in his discipline. However, he is often seen as a precursor to the Portuguese neurologist, Egas Moniz, who performed the first leucotomy, later known as lobotomy, in 1936.

== Legacy ==
Burckhardt’s work has been increasingly reexamined by modern historians of psychiatry, who note that his 1888–1891 operations represent the first systematic attempt to treat psychiatric symptoms through cortical surgery. Although sharply criticized by his contemporaries, recent scholarship emphasizes that his approach reflected the therapeutic limitations and emerging theories of cerebral localization in the late nineteenth century. His surgeries are now frequently used as a case study in the history of medical ethics, illustrating early tensions between experimental treatment and patient risk. Renewed archival interest in the late twentieth and early twenty-first centuries has helped clarify the scope of his procedures and establish his role as a precursor to later neurosurgical approaches to mental illness.

== Publications ==
- Burckhardt, Gottlieb (1875). Die Physiologische Diagnostik der Nervenkrankheiten (The Physiological Diagnosis of Nervous Diseases). Leipzig: W. Engelmann.
- Burckhardt, Gottlieb (1877). "Die lehre von den functionellen Centren des Gehirns und ihre Beziehung zur Psychologie und Psychiatrie (The doctrine of the functional centers of the brain and its relation to psychology and psychiatry)". Allgemeine Zeitschrift für Psychiatrie. 33: 434–54.
- Burckhardt, Gottlieb (1878). "Beobachtungen über die Temperaturen Geisteskranker (Observations on the temperatures of the mentally ill)". Arch für Psych und Nervenkrankheiten. 8 (2): 333–54. doi:10.1007/bf01791724. S2CID 30055718.
- Burckhardt, Gottlieb (1879). "Gemeine Rachsucht, unerlaubte Selbsthilfe oder Wahnsinn? Ein psychiatrisches Gutachten (Common revenge, madness or unauthorized self-help? A psychiatric report)". VRTLJSCHR für Gerichtl Med Berlin (1231): 235–51.
- Burckhardt, Gottlieb (1881). "Ein Fall von Brandstiftung; psychiatrisches Gutachten (A case of arson; psychiatric report)". Corresp.-Bl. Schweiz. Aerzte. 11: 577–86.
- Burckhardt, Gottlieb (1871). "Ueber die polare methode". Dtsch. Arch. Klin. Med. Bern: Dalpsche. pp. 100–115.
- Burckhardt, Gottlieb (1882). "Ein Fall von Worttaubheit (A case of word deafness)". Corresp.-Bl. Schweiz. Aerzte. 12: 673–82.
- Burckhardt, Gottlieb (1886). "Contribution à l'étude de l'hystérie traumatique (Contribution to the study of traumatic hysteria)". Rev Méd de la Suisse Rom Genève. 6: 735–46.
- Burckhardt, Gottlieb (1888). "Un cas de tumeur de la couche optique et du lobe temporal (A case of tumor of the optic thalamus and temporal lobe)". Rev Méd de la Suisse Rom Genève. 8: 727–40.
- Burckhardt, Gottlieb (1888–89). "Weitere Mittheilungen über Gefassbewegungen. Theoretisches und Praktisches (Other communications on vascular movements. Theoretical and Practical)". Arch für Psychiat Berl. 20 (3): 605–27. doi:10.1007/bf01790970. S2CID 34630466.
- Burckhardt, Gottlieb (1891). "Ueber Rindenexcisionen, als Beitrag zur operativen Therapie der Psychosen (About cortical excision, as a contribution to surgical treatment of psychosis)". Allgemeine Zeitschift für Psychiatrie. 47: 463–548.
- Burckhardt, Gottlieb (1892). "Zur Frage der Schräg-oder Steilschrift (Zur Frage der Schräg-oder Steilschrift)". Z Orthop Chir Stuttgart. 2: 1–22.

== Notes and references ==
=== Bibliography ===
- Akert, Konrad (1996). Swiss contributions to the neurosciences in four hundred years: from the Renaissance to the present. VDF Hochschulverlag AG. ISBN 978-3-7281-2362-6.
- Berrios, German E. (1991). "Psychosurgery in Britain and elsewhere: a conceptual history". In Berrios, German E.; Freeman, Hugh (eds.). 150 Years of British psychiatry, 1841–1991. London: Gaskell. pp. 180–196. ISBN 978-0-902241-36-7.
- Berrios, German E. (1997). "The origins of psychosurgery: Shaw, Burckhardt and Moniz". History of Psychiatry. 8 (1): 61–81. doi:10.1177/0957154X9700802905. ISSN 0957-154X. PMID 11619209. S2CID 22225524.
- Berrios, German E. (2008). "The hidden history of psychiatric therapies". In Tyrer, Peter J.; Silk, Kenneth R. (eds.). Cambridge Textbook of Effective Treatments in Psychiatry. Cambridge: Cambridge University Press. pp. 16–46. ISBN 978-0-521-84228-0.
- Ford, Paul J.; Henderson, Jaimie M. (2006). "Functional neurosurgical intervention: neuroethics in the operating rooms". In Judy Illes (ed.). Neuroethics: defining the issues in theory, practice, and policy. Oxford University Press. pp. 213–28. ISBN 978-0-19-856721-9.
- Green, Alexander; Astradsson, A.; Stacey, R.J.; Aziz, T.Z. (2010). "Functional and epilepsy neurosurgery". In Reuben Johnson; Alexander Green (eds.). Landmark Papers in Neurosurgery. Oxford University Press. pp. 205–257. ISBN 978-0-19-959125-1.
- Hagenbach, N. (1907). "Dr. Gottlieb Burckhardt". Corresp.-Bl. Schweiz. Aerzte. 37: 257–60.
- Heller, A.C.; Amar, A.P.; Liu, C.Y; Apuzzo, M.L.J. (2006). "Surgery of the mind and mood: A mosaic of issues in time and evolution". Neurosurgery. 59 (4): 720–39. doi:10.1227/01.NEU.0000240227.72514.27. PMID 17038938. S2CID 22958424.
- Joanette, Yves; Stemmer, Brigitte; Assal, Gil; Whitaker, Harry (1993). "From theory to practice: the unconventional contribution of Gottlieb Burckhardt to psychosurgery". Brain and Language. 45 (4): 572–587. doi:10.1006/brln.1993.1061. PMID 8118674. S2CID 25067671.
- Kotowicz, Zbigniew (2005). "Gottlieb Burckhardt and Egas Moniz–Two Beginnings of Psychosurgery". Gesnerus. 62 (1–2): 77–101. doi:10.1163/22977953-0620102004. PMID 16201322.
- Kotowicz, Zbigniew (2008). "Psychosurgery in Italy, 1936–39". History of Psychiatry. 19 (4): 479–86. doi:10.1177/0957154X07087345. ISSN 0957-154X. PMID 19397090. S2CID 33295058.
- Manjila, S.; Rengachary, S.; Xavier, A.R.; Parker, B.; Guthikonda, M. (2008). "Modern psychosurgery before Egas Moniz: a tribute to Gottlieb Burckhardt". Neurosurgical Focus. 25 (1, E9): 1–4. doi:10.3171/FOC/2008/25/7/E9. PMID 18590386. S2CID 38027761.
- Mareke, Arends; Fangerau, Heiner (2010). "Deep brain stimulation in psychiatric disorders". In Heiner Fangerau; Fegert Jörg; Arends Mareke (eds.). Implanted Minds: The Neuroethics of Intracerebral Stem Cell Transplantation and Deep Brain Stimulation. Verlag. pp. 137–151. ISBN 978-3-8376-1433-6.
- Müller, Charles R. (1960). "Gottlieb Burckhardt: Le Père de la topectomie". Reveu Médicale de la Suisse Romande. 28: 726–730.
- Nach, C. (1907). "Nekrolog Dr. G. Burckhardt". Allgemeine Zeitschrift für Psychiatrie. 64: 529–534.
- Noll, Richard (January 2007). The encyclopedia of schizophrenia and other psychotic disorders. Infobase Publishing. ISBN 978-0-8160-6405-2.
- Reevy, Gretchen; Ozer, Yvette Malamud; Ito, Yuri (2010). Encyclopedia of Emotion. Santa Barbara CA: Greenwood Publishing Group. ISBN 978-0-313-34576-0.
- Sakas, Damianos E.; Panourias, L.G.; Singounas, E.; Simpson, B.A. (2007). "Neurosurgery for psychiatric disorders: from the excision of brain tissue to the chronic electrical stimulation of neural networks". In Damianos E. Sakas; B.A. Simpson (eds.). Operative Neuromodulation. Functional Neuroprosthetic Surgery: An Introduction. Springer. pp. 365–374. ISBN 978-3-211-33078-4.
- Shorter, Edward (1990). "Mania, hysteria and gender in lower Austria, 1891–1905". History of Psychiatry. 1 (1): 3–31. doi:10.1177/0957154X9000100102. PMID 11622397. S2CID 28906069.
- Shorter, Edward (1997). A History of Psychiatry from the Era of the Asylum to the Age of Prozac. New York: Wiley. ISBN 978-0-471-15749-6. "shorter history of psychiatry."
- Steck, A.J. (2010). "Milestones in the development of neurology and psychiatry in Europe". Schweizer Archiv für Neurologie und Psychiatrie. 161 (3): 85–89. doi:10.4414/sanp.2010.02153.
- Stone, James L. (2001). "Gottlieb Burckhardt: the pioneer of psychosurgery". Journal of the History of the Neurosciences. 10 (1): 79–92. doi:10.1076/jhin.10.1.79.5634. ISSN 0964-704X. PMID 11446267. S2CID 29727830.
- Suchy, Yana (2011). Clinical Neuropsychology of Emotion. Guilford Press. ISBN 978-1-60918-072-0.
- Tierney, Ann Jane (2000). "Egas Moniz and the origins of psychosurgery: a review commemorating the 50th anniversary of Moniz's Nobel Prize". Journal of the History of the Neurosciences. 9 (1): 22–36. doi:10.1076/0964-704X(200004)9:1;1-2;FT022. ISSN 0964-704X. PMID 11232345. S2CID 12482874.
- Wepfer, J.J. (2009). "Histoire de la Société suisse de neurologie dans le contexte de l'évolution nationale et internationale de la neurologie". Schweizer Archiv für Neurologie und Psychiatrie. 160 (4): 137–150. doi:10.4414/sanp.2009.02060.
- Whitaker, H.A.; Stemmer, B.; Joanette, Y. (1996). "A psychosurgical chapter in the history of cerebral localization: the six cases of Gottlieb Burkhardt". In Christopher Code; C.-W. Wallesch; Y. Joanette; A. Roch (eds.). Classic Cases in Neuropsychology. Hove: Psychology Press. pp. 275–304. ISBN 978-0-86377-395-2.

==== Online sources ====
- Denoth, Caroline Jagella (17 February 2003). "Burckhardt, Gottlieb". Dictionairre historique de la Suisse.
- Stroux, Ulrich (15 March 2012). "Linie Theodor Burckhardt 1549–1623" (PDF). www.stroux.org.
