= Lobotomy =

Discredited neurosurgical operation

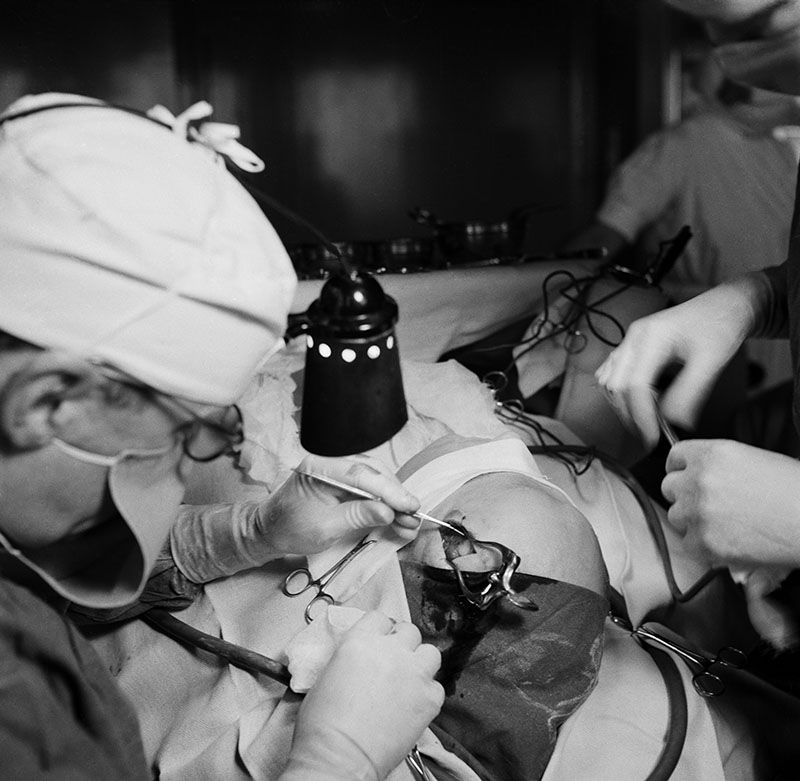
- Lobotomy underway at Södersjukhuset, Stockholm, in 1949
- Other names: Leucotomy, leukotomy
- Specialty: Psychosurgery
- ICD-9-CM: 01.32
- MeSH: D011612

A lobotomy (from Greek λοβός (lobos) 'lobe' and τομή (tomē) 'cut, slice') or leucotomy is a discredited form of neurosurgical treatment for psychiatric disorder or neurological disorder (e.g. epilepsy, depression) that involves severing nerve pathway connections in the brain's prefrontal cortex. The surgery severs most of the connections to and from the prefrontal cortex, and the anterior part of the frontal lobes to the rest of the brain.

From the 1930s until the 1970s, the treatment was used for handling psychiatric disorders as a mainstream procedure in some countries. A preoccupation with the ability to work and personal responsibility over patient well-being were contributing factors to the prevalence of lobotomies in the United States.

The originator of the procedure, Portuguese neurologist António Egas Moniz, shared the Nobel Prize for Physiology or Medicine of 1949 for the "discovery of the therapeutic value of leucotomy in certain psychoses", (Note: Walter Rudolf Hess, who was the joint winner with Moniz of the Nobel Prize in 1949 for his work on the function of the midbrain, had no involvement with leucotomy.) although the awarding of the prize has been subject to controversy.

The procedure was modified and championed by Walter Freeman, who performed the first lobotomy at a mental hospital in the United States in 1936. Its use increased dramatically from the early 1940s and into the 1950s; by 1951, almost 20,000 lobotomies had been performed in the US and proportionally more in the United Kingdom. More lobotomies were performed on women than on men: a 1951 study found that nearly 60% of American lobotomy patients were women, and limited data shows that 74% of lobotomies in Ontario from 1948 to 1952 were performed on female patients. From the 1950s onward, lobotomy began to be abandoned, first in the Soviet Union, where the procedure immediately garnered extensive criticism and was not widely employed, before being banned in December 1950, and then Europe. Derivatives of it such as stereotactic tractotomy and bilateral cingulotomy are still used.

== Medical effects ==
A 1944 film of four lobotomy patients in Bishop Clarkson Memorial Hospital in Nebraska, taken before and after surgery. The film's original abstract claims the footage shows "improvement that can result from prefrontal lobotomy in chronic psychotics". This footage was donated by the Psychological Cinema Register of Pennsylvania State College to the National LIbrary of Medicine.

Historically, patients of frontal lobotomy were, immediately following surgery, often stuporous and incontinent. Some developed an enormous appetite and gained considerable weight. Seizures were another common complication of surgery. Emphasis was put on the training of patients in the weeks and months following surgery.

The purpose of the operation was to reduce the symptoms of mental disorders, and it was recognized that this was accomplished at the expense of a person's personality and intellect. British psychiatrist Maurice Partridge, who conducted a follow-up study of 300 patients, said the treatment achieved its effects by "reducing the complexity of psychic life". Following the operation, spontaneity, responsiveness, self-awareness, and self-control were reduced. Activity was replaced by inertia, and people were mostly left emotionally blunted and restricted in their intellectual range.

The consequences of the operation have been described as "mixed". However, many lobotomy patients suffered devastating postoperative complications, including intracranial hemorrhage, epilepsy, alterations in affect and personality, brain abscess, dementia, and death. Ominous portrayals of lobotomized patients in novels, plays, and films further diminished public opinion, and the development of antipsychotic medications led to a rapid decline in lobotomy's popularity and Walter Freeman's reputation. Others could leave the hospital or become more manageable within the hospital. A precarious number of people managed to return to responsible work, while at the other extreme, people were left with severe and disabling impairments. Most people fell into an intermediate group, left with some improvement of their symptoms but also with emotional and intellectual deficits to which they made a better or worse adjustment.

On average, there was a mortality rate of approximately 5% during the 1940s. A survey of British lobotomy patients lobotomised between 1942 and 1954 found that 13% of patients were deemed to have made a full recovery and a further 28% were deemed to have made a significant recovery; for 25% lobotomy was deemed to have made no change and 4% died as a result of the surgery.

Patients after lobotomy can have a lowering and stabilising of blood pressure. They may have inertia, struggle to complete test problems, and might suffer from metabolic disorders. They may also be considered dispassionate about their feelings because they lack a strong emotional component. It is reported that the patients face less anxiety and stress, but have a constant feel of depression.

The frontal lobotomy procedure could have severe negative effects on a patient's personality and ability to function independently. Lobotomy patients often show a marked reduction in initiative and inhibition. They may also exhibit difficulty imagining themselves in the position of others because of decreased cognition and detachment from society.

Walter Freeman coined the term "surgically induced childhood" and used it constantly to refer to the results of lobotomy. The operation left people with an "infantile personality"; a period of maturation would then, according to Freeman, lead to recovery. In an unpublished memoir, he described how the "personality of the patient was changed in some way in the hope of rendering him more amenable to the social pressures under which he is supposed to exist." He described one 29-year-old woman as being, following lobotomy, a "smiling, lazy, and satisfactory patient with the personality of an oyster" who could not remember Freeman's name and endlessly poured coffee from an empty pot. When her parents had difficulty dealing with her behavior, Freeman advised a system of rewards (ice cream) and punishment (smacks). Despite these drawbacks, Freeman contended that lobotomy effectively reduced antisocial behavior in schizophrenic patients, and continued to do so after the emergence of antipsychotic medication became a preferred treatment.

== Early history ==
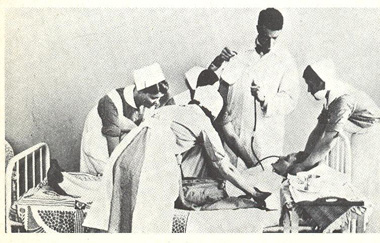
Insulin shock therapy administered in Helsinki in the 1950s

In the early 20th century, the number of patients residing in mental hospitals increased significantly (Note: A 1937 report detailed that in the United States, there were then 477 psychiatric institutions with a total population of approximately 451,672 patients, almost half of whom had been resident for five years or more. The report also observed that psychiatric patients occupied 55 percent of all hospital beds in America. Conditions within US mental hospitals became the subject of public debate as a series of exposes were published in the 1940s. A 1946 Life magazine article remarked that the nation's system of mental hospitals resembled "little more than concentration camps on the Belsen pattern"; a point the piece emphasized with documentary photography that depicted patient neglect and dilapidated material conditions within psychiatric institutions.) while little in the way of effective medical treatment was available. (Note: Ugo Cerletti, the Italian psychiatrist and joint inventor with Lucio Bini of electroconvulsive therapy, described psychiatry during the interwar period as a "funereal science". Likewise Egas Moniz, the inventor of leucotomy, referred to the "impotência terapeutica" (therapeutic impotence) of existing therapeutic remedies during the 1930s.) Lobotomy was one of a series of radical and invasive physical therapies developed in Europe at this time that signaled a break with the psychiatric culture of therapeutic nihilism which had prevailed since the mid-nineteenth century. The new "heroic" physical therapies devised during this experimental era, including malarial therapy for general paresis of the insane (1917), deep sleep therapy (1920), insulin shock therapy (1933), cardiazol shock therapy (1934), and electroconvulsive therapy (1938), served to galvanize a profession which had been both therapeutically moribund and systemically demoralized. Unlike other medical disciplines (e.g., cardiology, dermatology, orthopedics, etc.), which applied surgical and pharmacological treatments that were both apparent and measurable regarding their efficacy, psychiatry had often struggled with quantification. These novel remedial methodologies, however, meant that (at the time) modern psychiatric treatments were no longer relegated to the metaphysical or abstract, and this increased the popularity of the field among clinicians and prospective patients alike. Suddenly, conditions like insanity, psychosis, and others felt less like incurable afflictions and more like surmountable diagnoses, emboldening psychiatrists to attempt new procedures. Additionally, the relative (and quantitative) success of the shock therapies, despite the considerable risks they posed to patients, also helped to inspire doctors in the field to pioneer ever more drastic forms of medical interventions, including lobotomies.

The clinician-historian Joel Braslow argues that from malarial therapy onward to lobotomy, physical psychiatric therapies "spiral closer and closer to the interior of the brain", with this organ increasingly taking "center stage as a source of disease and site of cure". For medical historian Roy Porter, the often violent and invasive psychiatric interventions developed during the 1930s and 1940s are indicative of both the well-intentioned desire of psychiatrists to find some medical means of alleviating the suffering of the vast number of patients then in psychiatric hospitals and also the relative lack of social power of those same patients to resist the increasingly radical and even reckless interventions of asylum doctors. Many doctors, patients, and family members of the period believed that, despite potentially catastrophic consequences, the results of lobotomy were seemingly positive in many instances or were at least deemed as such when measured next to the apparent alternative of long-term institutionalisation. Lobotomy has always been controversial, but for a period of the medical mainstream, it was regarded as a legitimate last-resort remedy for categories of patients who were otherwise regarded as hopeless. Today, lobotomy has become a disparaged procedure, a byword for medical barbarism and an exemplary instance of the medical trampling of patients' rights.

=== Early psychosurgery ===
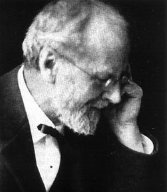
The Swiss psychiatrist Gottlieb Burckhardt (1836–1907)

Before the 1930s, individual doctors had infrequently experimented with novel surgical operations on those deemed insane. Most notably in 1888, Swiss psychiatrist Gottlieb Burckhardt initiated what is commonly considered the first systematic attempt at modern human psychosurgery. He operated on six chronic patients under his care at the Swiss Préfargier Asylum, removing sections of their cerebral cortex. Three pervasive views on the nature of mental illness and its relationship to the brain informed Burckhardt's decision to operate. First, the belief that mental illness was organic in nature, and reflected an underlying brain pathology; next, that the nervous system was organized according to an associationist model comprising an input or afferent system (a sensory center), a connecting system where information processing took place (an association center), and an output or efferent system (a motor center); and, finally, a modular conception of the brain whereby discrete mental faculties were connected to specific regions of the brain. Burckhardt hypothesized that by deliberately creating lesions in regions of the brain identified as association centers, a transformation in behaviour might ensue. According to his model, those mentally ill might experience "excitations abnormal in quality, quantity and intensity" in the sensory regions of the brain, and this abnormal stimulation would then be transmitted to the motor regions, giving rise to mental pathology. He reasoned, however, that removing material from either of the sensory or motor zones could give rise to "grave functional disturbance". Instead, by targeting the association centers and creating a "ditch" around the motor region of the temporal lobe, he hoped to break their lines of communication and thus alleviate both mental symptoms and the experience of mental distress.

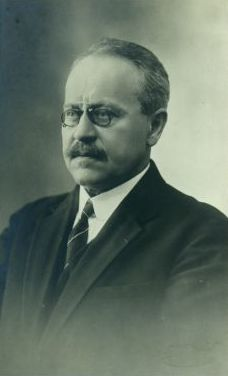
The Estonian neurosurgeon Ludvig Puusepp c. 1920

Intending to ameliorate symptoms in those with violent and intractable conditions rather than effect a cure, Burckhardt began operating on patients in December 1888, but both his surgical methods and instruments were crude and the results of the procedure were mixed at best. He operated on six patients in total and, according to his own assessment, two experienced no change, two patients became quieter, one patient experienced epileptic convulsions and died a few days after the operation, and one patient improved. (Note: The patient he thought improved subsequently committed suicide.) Complications included motor weakness, epilepsy, sensory aphasia and "word deafness". Claiming a success rate of 50 percent, he presented the results at the Berlin Medical Congress and published a report, but the response from his medical peers was hostile and he did no further operations.

In 1912, two physicians based in Saint Petersburg, the leading Russian neurologist Vladimir Bekhterev and his younger Estonian colleague, the neurosurgeon Ludvig Puusepp, published a paper reviewing a range of surgical interventions that had been performed on the mentally ill. While generally treating these endeavours favorably, in their consideration of psychosurgery they reserved unremitting scorn for Burckhardt's surgical experiments of 1888 and opined that it was extraordinary that a trained medical doctor could undertake such an unsound procedure.

We have quoted this data to show not only how groundless but also how dangerous these operations were. We are unable to explain how their author, holder of a degree in medicine, could bring himself to carry them out ...

The authors neglected to mention, however, that in 1910 Puusepp himself had performed surgery on the brains of three mentally ill patients, (Note: According to Puusepp, the three patients had manic depression or considered "epileptic equivalents".) sectioning the cortex between the frontal and parietal lobes. He had abandoned these attempts because of unsatisfactory results, and this experience probably inspired the invective that was directed at Burckhardt in the 1912 article. By 1937, Puusepp, despite his earlier criticism of Burckhardt, was increasingly persuaded that psychosurgery could be a valid medical intervention for the mentally disturbed. (Note: Puusepp admitted to his 1910 experimentation with psychosurgery in a 1937 publication. At that point he had completed a series of 14 leucotomies to relieve aggressive symptoms in patients. Convinced that the results had been positive in these cases, he felt that further research into psychosurgery was warranted.) In the late 1930s, he worked closely with the neurosurgical team of the Racconigi Hospital near Turin to establish it as an early and influential centre for the adoption of leucotomy in Italy.

=== Development ===
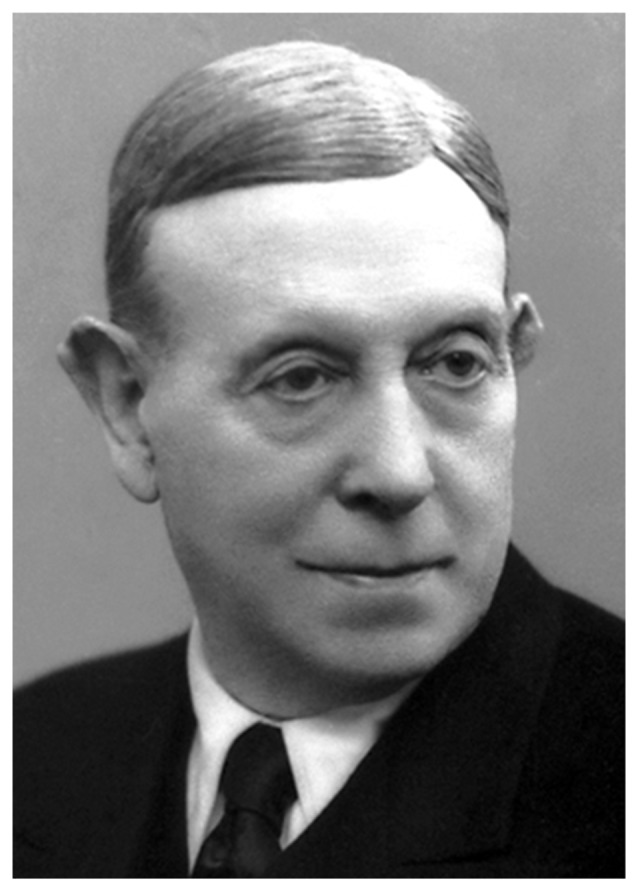
The pioneer of lobotomies, the Portuguese neurologist and Nobel Laureate António Egas Moniz

Leucotomy was first undertaken in 1935 under the direction of the Portuguese neurologist (and inventor of the term psychosurgery) António Egas Moniz. (Note: Professor of neurology at the University of Lisbon from 1911 to 1944, Moniz was also for several decades a prominent parliamentarian and diplomat. He was Portugal's ambassador to Spain during World War I and represented Portugal at the postwar Versailles Treaty negotiations, but after the Portuguese coup d'état of 1926, which ushered in the Ditadura Nacional (National Dictatorship), the Republican Moniz, then 51 years old, devoted his considerable talents and energies to neurological research entirely. Throughout his career he published on topics as diverse as neurology, sexology, historical biography, and the history of card games. For his 1927 development of cerebral angiography, which allowed routine visualisation of the brain's peripheral blood vessels for the first time, he was twice nominated, unsuccessfully, for a Nobel Prize. Some have attributed his development of leucotomy to a determination on his part to win the Nobel after these disappointments.) First developing an interest in psychiatric conditions and their somatic treatment in the early 1930s, Moniz conceived a new opportunity for recognition in the development of a surgical intervention on the brain as a treatment for mental illness.

==== Frontal lobes ====
The source of inspiration for Moniz's decision to hazard psychosurgery has been clouded by contradictory statements made on the subject by Moniz and others both contemporaneously and retrospectively. The traditional narrative addresses the question of why Moniz targeted the frontal lobes by way of reference to the work of the Yale neuroscientist John Fulton and, most dramatically, to a presentation Fulton made with his junior colleague Carlyle Jacobsen at the Second International Congress of Neurology held in London in 1935. Fulton's primary area of research was on the cortical function of primates and he had established America's first primate neurophysiology laboratory at Yale in the early 1930s. At the 1935 Congress, with Moniz in attendance, (Note: The American neuropsychiatrist Walter Freeman also attended the Congress, where he presented his research findings on cerebral ventriculography. Freeman, who would later play a central role in the popularisation and practice of leucotomy in America, also had an interest in personality changes following frontal lobe surgery.) Fulton and Jacobsen presented two chimpanzees named Becky and Lucy who had had frontal lobectomies and subsequent changes in behaviour and intellectual function. According to Fulton's account of the congress, they explained that before surgery, both animals, and especially Becky, the more emotional of the two, exhibited "frustrational behaviour" – that is, tantrums that could include rolling on the floor and defecating – if, because of their poor performance in a set of experimental tasks, they were not rewarded. Following the surgical removal of their frontal lobes, the behaviour of both primates changed markedly and Becky was pacified to such a degree that Jacobsen apparently stated it was as if she had joined a "happiness cult". During the question and answer section of the paper, Moniz, it is alleged, "startled" Fulton by inquiring if this procedure might be extended to human subjects suffering from mental illness. Fulton stated that he replied that while possible in theory, it was surely "too formidable" an intervention for use on humans.

Brain animation: left frontal lobe highlighted in red. Moniz targeted the frontal lobes in the leucotomy procedure he first conceived in 1933.

Moniz began his experiments with leucotomy just three months after the congress had reinforced the apparent cause-and-effect relationship between the Fulton and Jacobsen presentation and the Portuguese neurologist's resolve to operate on the frontal lobes. As the author of this account, Fulton, who has sometimes been claimed as the father of lobotomy, was later able to record that the technique had its true origination in his laboratory. Endorsing this version of events, in 1949, the Harvard neurologist Stanley Cobb remarked during his presidential address to the American Neurological Association that "seldom in the history of medicine has a laboratory observation been so quickly and dramatically translated into a therapeutic procedure". Fulton's report, penned ten years after the events described, is, however, without corroboration in the historical record and bears little resemblance to an earlier unpublished account he wrote of the congress. In this previous narrative, he mentioned an incidental, private exchange with Moniz, but it is likely that the official version of their public conversation he promulgated is without foundation. In fact, Moniz stated that he had conceived of the operation sometime before his journey to London in 1935, having told in confidence his junior colleague, the young neurosurgeon Pedro Almeida Lima, as early as 1933 of his psychosurgical idea. The traditional account exaggerates the importance of Fulton and Jacobsen to Moniz's decision to initiate frontal lobe surgery, and omits the fact that a detailed body of neurological research that emerged at this time suggested to Moniz and other neurologists and neurosurgeons that surgery on this part of the brain might yield significant personality changes in the mentally ill.

The frontal lobes have been the object of scientific inquiry and speculation since the late 19th century. Fulton's contribution, while it may have functioned as a source of intellectual support, is in itself unnecessary and inadequate as an explanation of Moniz's resolution to operate on this section of the brain. Under an evolutionary and hierarchical model of brain development, it had been hypothesized that those regions associated with the more recent development, such as the mammalian brain and, most especially, the frontal lobes, were responsible for more complex cognitive functions. However, this theoretical formulation found little laboratory support, as 19th-century experimentation found no significant change in animal behaviour following surgical removal or electrical stimulation of the frontal lobes. This picture of the so-called "silent lobe" changed in the period after World War I with the production of clinical reports of ex-servicemen with brain trauma. The refinement of neurosurgical techniques also facilitated increasing attempts to remove brain tumours and treat focal epilepsy in humans, and led to more precise experimental neurosurgery in animal studies. Cases were reported where mental symptoms were alleviated following the surgical removal of diseased or damaged brain tissue. The accumulation of medical case studies on behavioural changes following damage to the frontal lobes led to the formulation of the concept of Witzelsucht, which designated a neurological condition characterised by a certain hilarity and childishness in those with the condition. The picture of frontal lobe function that emerged from these studies was complicated by the observation that neurological deficits attendant on damage to a single lobe might be compensated for if the opposite lobe remained intact. In 1922, the Italian neurologist Leonardo Bianchi published a detailed report on the results of bilateral lobectomies in animals that supported the contention that the frontal lobes were both integral to intellectual function and that their removal led to the disintegration of the subject's personality. This work, while influential, was not without its critics due to deficiencies in experimental design.

The first bilateral lobectomy of a human subject was performed by the American neurosurgeon Walter Dandy in 1930. (Note: The patient had meningioma, a rare form of brain tumour arising in the meninges.) The neurologist Richard Brickner reported on this case in 1932, relating that the recipient, known as "Patient A", while experiencing a blunting of affect, had no apparent decrease in intellectual function and seemed, at least to the casual observer, perfectly normal. Brickner concluded from this evidence that "the frontal lobes are not 'centers' for the intellect". These clinical results were replicated in a similar operation undertaken in 1934 by the neurosurgeon Roy Glenwood Spurling and reported on by the neuropsychiatrist Spafford Ackerly. By the mid-1930s, interest in the function of the frontal lobes reached a high-water mark. This was reflected in the 1935 neurological congress in London, which hosted as part of its deliberations, "a remarkable symposium ... on the functions of the frontal lobes". The panel was chaired by Henri Claude, a French neuropsychiatrist, who commenced the session by reviewing the state of research on the frontal lobes, and concluded that "altering the frontal lobes profoundly modifies the personality of subjects". This parallel symposium contained numerous papers by neurologists, neurosurgeons and psychologists; amongst these was one by Brickner, which impressed Moniz greatly, that again detailed the case of "Patient A". Fulton and Jacobsen's paper, presented in another session of the conference on experimental physiology, was notable in linking animal and human studies on the function of the frontal lobes. Thus, at the time of the 1935 Congress, Moniz had available to him an increasing body of research on the role of the frontal lobes that extended well beyond the observations of Fulton and Jacobsen.

Nor was Moniz the only medical practitioner in the 1930s to have contemplated procedures directly targeting the frontal lobes. Although ultimately discounting brain surgery as carrying too much risk, physicians and neurologists such as William Mayo, Thierry de Martel, Richard Brickner, and Leo Davidoff had, before 1935, entertained the proposition. (Note: Brickner and Davidoff had planned, before Moniz's first leucotomies, to operate on the frontal lobes to relieve depression.) Inspired by Julius Wagner-Jauregg's development of malarial therapy for the treatment of general paresis of the insane, the French physician Maurice Ducosté reported in 1932 that he had injected 5 ml of malarial blood directly into the frontal lobes of over 100 paretic patients through holes drilled into the skull. He claimed that the injected paretics showed signs of "uncontestable mental and physical amelioration" and that the results for psychotic patients undergoing the procedure were also "encouraging". The experimental injection of fever-inducing malarial blood into the frontal lobes was also replicated during the 1930s in the work of Ettore Mariotti and M. Sciutti in Italy and Ferdière Coulloudon in France. In Switzerland, almost simultaneously with the commencement of Moniz's leucotomy programme, the neurosurgeon François Ody had removed the entire right frontal lobe of a catatonic schizophrenic patient. In Romania, Ody's procedure was adopted by Dimitri Bagdasar and Constantinesco working out of the Central Hospital in Bucharest. Ody, who delayed publishing his own results for several years, later rebuked Moniz for claiming to have cured patients through leucotomy without waiting to determine if there had been a "lasting remission".

==== Neurological model ====
The theoretical underpinnings of Moniz's psychosurgery were largely commensurate with the nineteenth-century ones that had informed Burckhardt's decision to excise matter from the brains of his patients. Although in his later writings, Moniz referenced both the neuron theory of Ramón y Cajal and the conditioned reflex of Ivan Pavlov, in essence he simply interpreted this new neurological research in terms of the old psychological theory of associationism. He differed significantly from Burckhardt, however in that he did not think there was any organic pathology in the brains of the mentally ill, but rather that their neural pathways were caught in fixed and destructive circuits leading to "predominant, obsessive ideas". (Note: Moniz wrote in 1948: 'sufferers from melancholia, for instance, are distressed by fixed and obsessive ideas ... and live in a permanent state of anxiety caused by a fixed idea which predominates over all their lives ... in contrast to automatic actions, these morbid ideas are deeply rooted in the synaptic complex which regulates the functioning of consciousness, stimulating it and keeping it in constant activity ... all these considerations led me to the following conclusion: it is necessary to alter these synaptic adjustments and change the paths chosen by the impulses in their constant passage so as to modify the corresponding ideas and force thoughts along different paths ...') As Moniz wrote in 1936:

[The] mental troubles must have ... a relation with the formation of cellulo-connective groupings, which become more or less fixed. The cellular bodies may remain altogether normal, their cylinders will not have any anatomical alterations; but their multiple liaisons, very variable in normal people, may have arrangements more or less fixed, which will have a relation with persistent ideas and deliria in certain morbid psychic states.

For Moniz, "to cure these patients", it was necessary to "destroy the more or less fixed arrangements of cellular connections that exist in the brain, and particularly those which are related to the frontal lobes", thus removing their fixed pathological brain circuits. Moniz believed the brain would functionally adapt to such injury. Unlike the position adopted by Burckhardt, it was unfalsifiable according to the knowledge and technology of the time, as the absence of a known correlation between physical brain pathology and mental illness could not disprove his thesis.

==== First leucotomies ====
The hypotheses underlying the procedure might be called into question; the surgical intervention might be considered very audacious; but such arguments occupy a secondary position because it can be affirmed now that these operations are not prejudicial to either physical or psychic life of the patient, and also that recovery or improvement may be obtained frequently in this way.

— Egas Moniz (1937)

On 12 November 1935 at the Hospital de Santa Marta in Lisbon, Moniz initiated the first of a series of operations on the brains of people with mental illnesses. The initial patients selected for the operation were provided by the medical director of Lisbon's Miguel Bombarda Mental Hospital, José de Matos Sobral Cid. As Moniz lacked training in neurosurgery and his hands were impaired by gout, the procedure was performed under general anaesthetic by Pedro Almeida Lima, who had previously assisted Moniz with his research on cerebral angiography. (Note: Lima described his role as that of an "instrument handled by the Master".) The intention was to remove some of the long fibres that connected the frontal lobes to other major brain centres. To this end, it was decided that Lima would trephine into the side of the skull and then inject ethanol into the "subcortical white matter of the prefrontal area" so as to destroy the connecting fibres, or association tracts, and create what Moniz termed a "frontal barrier". (Note: Before operating on live subjects, they practised the procedure on a cadaver head.) After the first operation was complete, Moniz considered it a success and, observing that the patient's depression had been relieved, he declared her "cured" although she was never, in fact, discharged from the mental hospital. Moniz and Lima persisted with this method of injecting alcohol into the frontal lobes for the next seven patients, but, after having to inject some patients on numerous occasions to elicit what they considered a favourable result, they modified the means by which they would section the frontal lobes. For the ninth patient, they introduced a surgical instrument called a leucotome; this was a cannula that was 11 centimetres (4.3 in) in length and 2 centimetres (0.79 in) in diameter. It had a retractable wire loop at one end that, when rotated, produced a 1 centimetre (0.39 in) diameter circular lesion in the white matter of the frontal lobe. Typically, six lesions were cut into each lobe, but, if they were dissatisfied with the results, Lima might perform several procedures, each producing multiple lesions in the left and right frontal lobes.

By the conclusion of this first run of leucotomies in February 1936, Moniz and Lima had operated on twenty patients with an average period of one week between each procedure; Moniz published his findings with great haste in March of the same year. The patients were aged between 27 and 62 years of age; twelve were female, and eight were male. Nine of the patients were diagnosed with depression, six with schizophrenia, two with panic disorder, and one each with mania, catatonia and manic-depression. Their most prominent symptoms were anxiety and agitation. The duration of their illness before the procedure varied from as little as four weeks to as much as 22 years, although all but four had been ill for at least one year. Patients were normally operated on the day they arrived at Moniz's clinic and returned within ten days to the Miguel Bombarda Mental Hospital. A perfunctory post-operative follow-up assessment took place anywhere from one to ten weeks following surgery. Complications were observed in each of the leucotomy patients and included: "increased temperature, vomiting, bladder and bowel incontinence, diarrhea, and ocular affections such as ptosis and nystagmus, as well as psychological effects such as apathy, akinesia, lethargy, timing, and local disorientation, kleptomania, and abnormal sensations of hunger". Moniz asserted that these effects were transitory and, according to his published assessment, the outcome for these first twenty patients was that 35%, or seven cases, improved significantly, another 35% were somewhat improved and the remaining 30% (six cases) were unchanged. There were no deaths and he did not consider that any patients had deteriorated following leucotomy.

== History after 1936 ==
Moniz rapidly disseminated his results through articles in the medical press and a monograph in 1936. Initially, however, the medical community appeared hostile to the new procedure. On 26 July 1936, one of his assistants, Diogo Furtado, gave a presentation at the Parisian meeting of the Société Médico-Psychologique on the results of the second cohort of patients leucotomised by Lima. Sobral Cid, who had supplied Moniz with the first set of patients for leucotomy from his own hospital in Lisbon, attended the meeting and denounced the technique, declaring that the patients who had been returned to his care post-operatively were "diminished" and had experienced a "degradation of personality". He also claimed that the changes Moniz observed in patients were more properly attributed to shock and brain trauma, and he derided the theoretical architecture that Moniz had constructed to support the new procedure as "cerebral mythology." At the same meeting the Parisian psychiatrist, Paul Courbon, stated he could not endorse a surgical technique that was solely supported by theoretical considerations rather than clinical observations. He also opined that the mutilation of an organ could not improve its function and that such cerebral wounds as were occasioned by leucotomy risked the later development of meningitis, epilepsy and brain abscesses. Nonetheless, Moniz's reported successful surgical treatment of 14 out of 20 patients led to the rapid adoption of the procedure on an experimental basis by individual clinicians in countries such as Brazil, Cuba, Italy, Romania and the United States during the 1930s.

=== Italian leucotomy ===
In the present state of affairs if some are critical about lack of caution in therapy, it is, on the other hand, deplorable and inexcusable to remain apathetic, with folded hands, content with learned lucubrations upon symptomatologic minutiae or upon psychopathic curiosities, or even worse, not even doing that.

— Amarro Fiamberti

Throughout the remainder of the 1930s, the number of leucotomies performed in most countries where the technique was adopted remained quite low. In Britain, which was later a major centre for leucotomy, (Note: It was estimated by William Sargant and Eliot Slater that 15,000 leucotomies had been performed in the UK by 1962.) only six operations had been undertaken before 1942. Generally, medical practitioners who attempted the procedure adopted a cautious approach, and few patients were leucotomised before the 1940s. Italian neuropsychiatrists, who were typically early and enthusiastic adopters of leucotomy, were exceptional in eschewing such a gradualist course.

Leucotomy was first reported in the Italian medical press in 1936, and Moniz published an article in Italian on the technique in the following year. In 1937, he was invited to Italy to demonstrate the procedure and for two weeks in June of that year, he visited medical centres in Trieste, Ferrara, and one close to Turin – the Racconigi Hospital – where he instructed his Italian neuropsychiatric colleagues on leucotomy and also oversaw several operations. Leucotomy was featured at two Italian psychiatric conferences in 1937 and over the next two years a score of medical articles on Moniz's psychosurgery was published by Italian clinicians based in medical institutions located in Racconigi, Trieste, Naples, Genoa, Milan, Pisa, Catania and Rovigo. The major centre for leucotomy in Italy was the Racconigi Hospital, where the experienced neurosurgeon Ludvig Puusepp provided a guiding hand. (Note: The 14 leucotomies reported by Puusepp in his 1937 paper were performed at the Racconigi Hospital.) Under the medical directorship of Emilio Rizzatti, the medical personnel at this hospital had completed at least 200 leucotomies by 1939. Reports from clinicians based at other Italian institutions detailed significantly fewer leucotomy operations.

Experimental modifications of Moniz's operation were introduced with little delay by Italian medical practitioners. Most notably, in 1937 Amarro Fiamberti, the medical director of a psychiatric institution in Varese, first devised the transorbital procedure whereby the frontal lobes were accessed through the eye sockets. Fiamberti's method was to puncture the thin layer of orbital bone at the top of the socket and then inject alcohol or formalin into the white matter of the frontal lobes through this aperture. Using this method, while sometimes substituting a leucotome for a hypodermic needle, it is estimated that he leucotomised about 100 patients in the period up to the outbreak of World War II. Fiamberti's innovation of Moniz's method would later prove inspirational for Walter Freeman's development of transorbital lobotomy.

=== American leucotomy ===
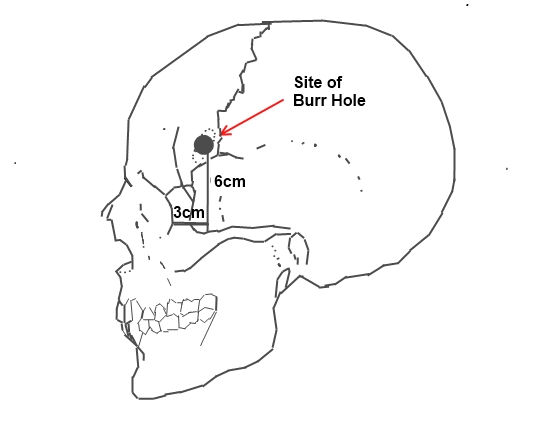
Site of borehole for the standard pre-frontal lobotomy/leucotomy operation as developed by Freeman and Watts

The first prefrontal leucotomy in the United States was performed at the George Washington University Hospital, on 14 September 1936, by the neurologist Walter Freeman, and his friend and colleague, the neurosurgeon James W. Watts. Freeman had first encountered Moniz at the London-hosted Second International Congress of Neurology in 1935, where he had presented a poster exhibit of the Portuguese neurologist's work on cerebral angiography. Fortuitously occupying a booth next to Moniz, Freeman, delighted by their chance meeting, formed a highly favourable impression of Moniz, later remarking upon his "sheer genius". According to Freeman, if they had not met in person, it is highly unlikely that he would have ventured into the domain of frontal lobe psychosurgery. Freeman's interest in psychiatry was the natural outgrowth of his appointment in 1924 as the medical director of the Research Laboratories of the Government Hospital for the Insane in Washington, known colloquially as St Elizabeth's. Freeman, who favoured an organic model of mental illness causation, spent the next several years exhaustively, yet ultimately fruitlessly, investigating a neuropathological basis for insanity. Chancing upon a preliminary communication by Moniz on leucotomy in the spring of 1936, Freeman initiated a correspondence in May of that year. Writing that he had been considering psychiatric brain surgery previously, he informed Moniz that, "having your authority I expect to go ahead". Moniz, in return, promised to send him a copy of his forthcoming monograph on leucotomy and urged him to purchase a leucotome from a French supplier.

Upon receipt of Moniz's monograph, Freeman reviewed it anonymously for the Archives of Neurology and Psychiatry. Praising the text as one whose "importance can scarcely be overestimated", he summarised Moniz's rationale for the procedure as based on the fact that while no physical abnormality of cerebral cell bodies was observable in the mentally ill, their cellular interconnections may harbour a "fixation of certain patterns of relationship among various groups of cells" and that this resulted in obsessions, delusions and mental morbidity. While recognising that Moniz's thesis was inadequate, for Freeman it had the advantage of circumventing the search for diseased brain tissue in the mentally ill by instead suggesting that the problem was a functional one of the brain's internal wiring, where relief might be obtained by severing problematic mental circuits.

In 1937, Freeman and Watts adapted Lima and Moniz's surgical procedure and created the Freeman-Watts technique, also known as the Freeman-Watts standard prefrontal lobotomy, which they styled the "precision method".

=== Transorbital lobotomy ===
The Freeman-Watts prefrontal lobotomy still required drilling holes in the skull, so surgery had to be performed in an operating room by trained neurosurgeons. Walter Freeman believed this surgery would be unavailable to those he saw as needing it most: patients in state mental hospitals that had no operating rooms, surgeons, or anesthesia, and limited budgets. Freeman wanted to simplify the procedure so that psychiatrists could carry it out in psychiatric hospitals.

Inspired by the work of Italian psychiatrist Amarro Fiamberti, Freeman at some point conceived of approaching the frontal lobes through the eye sockets instead of through drilled holes in the skull. In 1945, he took an ice pick (Note: Frank Freeman, Walter Freeman's son, stated in an interview with Howard Dully that: "He had several ice-picks that just cluttered the back of the kitchen drawer. The first ice pick came right out of our drawer. A humble ice-pick to go right into the frontal lobes. It was, from a cosmetic standpoint, diabolical. Just observing this thing was horrible, gruesome." When Dully asked Frank Freeman, then a 79-year-old security guard, whether he was proud of his father, he replied: "Oh yes, yes, yeah. He was terrific. He was really quite a remarkable pioneer lobotomist. I wish he could have gotten further.") from his own kitchen and began testing the idea on grapefruit (Note: Rodney Dully, whose son Howard Dully had had a transorbital lobotomy performed on him by Walter Freeman when he was twelve years old, stated in an interview with his son that: "I only met him [Freeman] I think the one time. He described how accurate it [transorbital lobotomy] was and that he had practised the cutting on, literally, a carload of grapefruit, getting the right move and the right turn. That's what he told me.") and cadavers.

The use of lobotomy in the United States was resisted and criticized heavily by American neurosurgeons. However, because Freeman managed to promote the success of the surgery through the media, lobotomy became touted as a miracle procedure, capturing the attention of the public and leading to an overwhelming demand for the operation. In 1945, Freeman streamlined the procedure, replacing it with transorbital lobotomy, in which a pick-like instrument was forced through the back of the eye sockets to pierce the thin bone that separates the eye sockets from the frontal lobes. The pick's point was then inserted into the frontal lobe and used to sever connections in the brain (presumably between the prefrontal cortex and thalamus). In 1946, Freeman performed this procedure for the first time on a patient, who was subdued before the operation with electroshock treatment.

The transorbital lobotomy procedure, which Freeman performed very quickly, sometimes in less than 10 minutes, was used on many patients with relatively minor mental disorders that Freeman believed did not warrant traditional lobotomy surgery, in which the skull itself was opened. A large proportion of such lobotomized patients exhibited reduced tension or agitation. Many also showed other effects, such as apathy, passivity, lack of initiative, poor concentration, and a generally decreased depth and intensity of their emotional response to life. Some died as a result of the procedure. However, those effects were not widely reported in the 1940s, and at that time, the long-term effects were largely unknown. Because the procedure met with seemingly widespread success, Moniz was awarded the 1949 Nobel Prize for Physiology or Medicine (along with Swiss physiologist Walter Rudolf Hess).

Lobotomies were performed on a wide scale during the 1940s; Freeman himself performed or supervised more than 3,500 lobotomies by the late 1960s. Freeman performed his first transorbital lobotomy on Ellen Ionesco, a woman who suffered from bouts of manic depression and suicidal ideation. Freeman utilized media coverage and penned editorials for numerous interviews promoting the procedure and achieving accolades for his work in psychiatric care.

Watts did not favor the transorbital method, and this difference of opinion contributed to the end of their partnership. Watts resisted the technique itself, Freeman's lack of sterile technique when performing it, and the idea of performing the procedure in an outpatient setting. Watts recalled that the hospital reprimanded Freeman, stating that he was "not a surgeon and if he wants to operate he'll have to apply for surgical privileges."

Freeman performed the first transorbital lobotomy on a live patient in 1946. Its simplicity suggested the possibility of carrying it out in mental hospitals lacking the surgical facilities required for the earlier, more complex procedure. (Freeman suggested that, where conventional anesthesia was unavailable, electroconvulsive therapy be used to render the patient unconscious.) In 1947, the Freeman and Watts partnership ended, as the latter was disgusted by Freeman's barbarism and neglectful modifications of the lobotomy from a surgical operation into a simple "office" procedure. Between 1940 and 1944, 684 lobotomies were performed in the United States. However, because of the fervent promotion of the technique by Freeman and Watts, those numbers increased sharply toward the end of the decade. In 1949, the peak year for lobotomies in the US, 5,074 procedures were undertaken, and by 1951 over 18,608 individuals had been lobotomized in the US.

== Prevalence ==
In the United States, approximately 40,000 people were lobotomized, and in England, 17,000 lobotomies were performed. According to one estimate, in the three Nordic countries of Denmark, Norway, and Sweden, a combined figure of approximately 9,300 lobotomies was performed. Scandinavian hospitals lobotomized 2.5 times as many people per capita as hospitals in the US. According to another estimate, Sweden lobotomized at least 4,500 people between 1944 and 1966, mainly women. This figure includes young children. And in Norway, there were 2,005 known lobotomies. In Denmark, there were 4,500 known lobotomies. The Soviet Union banned the practice in 1950 on moral grounds. In Germany, it was performed only a few times. By the late 1970s, the practice of lobotomy had generally ceased, although it continued as late as the 1980s in France. As of 2019, legality of the procedure in the United States varies according to state law, with some states restricting it heavily, while others effectively leave its regulation to laws of general applicability.

== Criticism ==
Early skepticism toward lobotomy emerged in Soviet psychiatry. As reports on leucotomy and lobotomy surfaced in Soviet medical journals between 1936 and 1937, followed by more extensive reviews of Freeman and Watts's initial studies in 1939, Soviet reviewers expressed alarm at the procedure's severe complications and a reported 5 percent mortality rate, while also questioning its efficacy, observing that symptoms like fear, depression, and agitation often resolved spontaneously without necessitating such a dramatic procedure. These reviews suggested lobotomy should not be performed in the USSR.

Later, by 1944, an author in the Journal of Nervous and Mental Disease remarked: "The history of prefrontal lobotomy has been brief and stormy. Its course has been dotted with both violent opposition and with slavish, unquestioning acceptance." Beginning in 1947 Swedish psychiatrist Snorre Wohlfahrt evaluated early trials, reporting that it is "distinctly hazardous to leucotomize schizophrenics" and that lobotomy was "still too imperfect to enable us, with its aid, to venture on a general offensive against chronic cases of mental disorder", stating further that "Psychosurgery has as yet failed to discover its precise indications and contraindications and the methods must unfortunately still be regarded as rather crude and hazardous in many respects." In 1948 Norbert Wiener, the author of Cybernetics: Or the Control and Communication in the Animal and the Machine, said: "Prefrontal lobotomy... has recently been having a certain vogue, probably not unconnected with the fact that it makes the custodial care of many patients easier. Let me remark in passing that killing them makes their custodial care still easier."

Concerns about lobotomy steadily grew. Soviet psychiatrist Vasily Gilyarovsky criticized lobotomy and the mechanistic brain localization assumption used to carry out lobotomy:

It is assumed that the transection of white substance of the frontal lobes impairs their connection with the thalamus and eliminates the possibility of receiving from it stimuli which lead to irritation and, on the whole, derange mental functions. This explanation is mechanistic and goes back to the narrow localizationism characteristic of American psychiatrists, from where leucotomy was imported to us.

The Soviet Union officially banned the procedure in 1950 on the initiative of Gilyarovsky. Doctors in the Soviet Union concluded that the procedure was "contrary to the principles of humanity" and "'through lobotomy' an insane person is changed into an idiot". By the 1970s, numerous countries had banned the procedure, as had several US states.

In 1977 after the National Research Act created the National Commission for the Protection of Human Subjects of Biomedical and Behavioral Research, the Commission investigated allegations that psychosurgery – including lobotomy techniques – were used to control minorities and restrain individual rights. Its published report did not recommend a ban on psychosurgery, but noted that the risks to patients from psychosurgery and its potential abuse required strong safeguards.

Torsten Wiesel has called the award of the Nobel Prize to Moniz an "astounding [error] of judgment ... a terrible mistake", and there have been calls for the Nobel Foundation to rescind the award.

== Notable cases ==
- Rosemary Kennedy, sister of US president John F. Kennedy, underwent a lobotomy in 1941 that left her incapacitated and institutionalized for the rest of her life.
- Howard Dully wrote a memoir of his late-life discovery that he had been lobotomized in 1960 at age 12.
- Josef Hassid, a Polish violinist and composer, was diagnosed with schizophrenia and died at the age of 26 following a lobotomy performed on him in England.
- Swedish modernist painter Sigrid Hjertén died following a lobotomy in 1948.
- American playwright Tennessee Williams's older sister Rose received a lobotomy that left her incapacitated for life; the episode is said to have inspired characters and motifs in some of his works.
- It is often said that when an iron rod was accidentally driven through the head of Phineas Gage in 1848, this constituted an "accidental lobotomy", or that this event somehow inspired the development of surgical lobotomy a century later. According to the only book-length study of Gage, careful inquiry turns up no such link.
- In 2011, Daniel Nijensohn, an Argentine-born neurosurgeon at Yale, examined X-rays of Eva Perón and concluded that she underwent a lobotomy for the treatment of pain and anxiety in the last months of her life.

== Literary and cinematic portrayals ==
Lobotomies have been featured in several literary and cinematic presentations that both reflected society's attitude toward the procedure and, at times, changed it. Writers and filmmakers have played a pivotal role in turning public sentiment against the procedure.

- Robert Penn Warren's 1946 novel All the King's Men describes a lobotomy as making "a Comanche brave look like a tyro with a scalping knife", and portrays the surgeon as a repressed man who cannot change others with love, so he instead resorts to "high-grade carpentry work".
- Tennessee Williams criticized lobotomy in his play Suddenly, Last Summer (1958) because it was sometimes inflicted on homosexuals – to render them "morally sane". In the play, a wealthy matriarch offers the local mental hospital a substantial donation if the hospital will give her niece a lobotomy, which she hopes will stop the niece's shocking revelations about her son. Warned that a lobotomy might not stop her niece's "babbling", she responds, "That may be, maybe not, but after the operation, who would believe her, Doctor?".
- In Ken Kesey's 1962 novel One Flew Over the Cuckoo's Nest and its 1975 film adaptation, lobotomy is described as "frontal-lobe castration", a form of punishment and control after which "There's nothin' in the face. Just like one of those store dummies." In one patient, "You can see by his eyes how they burned him out over there; his eyes are all smoked up and gray and deserted inside."
- In Sylvia Plath's 1963 novel The Bell Jar, the protagonist reacts with horror to the "perpetual marble calm" of a lobotomized young woman.
- Elliott Baker's 1964 novel and 1966 film version, A Fine Madness, portrays the dehumanizing lobotomy of a womanizing, quarrelsome poet who, afterward, is just as aggressive as ever. The surgeon is depicted as an inhumane crackpot.
- The 1982 biopic film Frances depicts actress Frances Farmer (the subject of the film) undergoing transorbital lobotomy (though the idea that a lobotomy was performed on Farmer, and that Freeman performed it, has been criticized as having little or no factual foundation).
- Katherine Dunn's 1989 novel Geek Love centers on a freak show whose leader founds a cult practicing amputation and lobotomy.
- Joyce Carol Oates's 1995 novel Zombie includes a verbatim extract of Freeman and Watts's 1942 treatise Psychosurgery describing leucotomy. The antihero Quentin reads this passage and similar descriptions of lobotomy. Sexually fantasizing about submissive lobotomized patients, Quentin seeks seeks to replicate Freeman's transorbital lobotomy technique on his victims using an icepick. Jeffrey Dahmer was Oates's inspiration for the character of Quentin; Dahmer did not use Freeman's technique on his victims, but rather drilled into their skulls to pour acid into them.

== See also ==
- Bilateral cingulotomy – destruction of a part of the brain
- Bioethics and medical ethics
- Frontal lobe disorder
- Frontal lobe injury
- Psychosurgery
- History of psychosurgery in the United Kingdom

== Sources ==
Print Sources

- Acharya, Hernish J (2004). "The Rise and Fall of Frontal Leucotomy". In Whitelaw, W.A. (ed.). The Proceedings of the 13th Annual History of Medicine Days (PDF). Calgary: Faculty of Medicine, University of Calgary. pp. 32–41. Archived (PDF) from the original on 1 April 2010.
- Arnold, William (1982). Shadowland. Berkley Books. ISBN 0-425-05481-0.
- Bechterev, V.; Puusepp, L. (1912). "La chirugie des aliénes" [Surgery of the Insane]. Archives Internationales de Neurologie. 34: 1–17, 69–89.
- Berrios, German E. (1997). "The Origins of Psychosurgery: Shaw, Burckhardt and Moniz". History of Psychiatry. 8 (1): 61–81. doi:10.1177/0957154X9700802905. PMID 11619209. Archived from the original on 30 December 2009.
- Bianchi, Leonardo (1922). The Mechanism of the Brain and the Function of the Frontal Lobes. translated by James Hogg MacDonald. New York & Edinburgh: William Wood & Co; E.S Livingstone.
- Bigsby, C.W.E. (1985). A Critical Introduction to Twentieth-Century American Drama: Volume 2. Cambridge University Press. ISBN 978-0-521-27717-4.
- Bragg, Lynn (2005). Myths and Mysteries of Washington (1st ed.). TwoDot. ISBN 978-0-7627-3427-6.
- Braslow, Joel T. (May 1995). "Effect of therapeutic innovation on perception of disease and the doctor-patient relationship: a history of general paralysis of the insane and malaria fever therapy, 1910–1950". American Journal of Psychiatry. 152 (2): 660–65. doi:10.1176/ajp.152.5.660. PMID 7726304.
- Braslow, Joel T. (1997). Mental Ills and Bodily Cures: Psychiatric Treatment in the First Half of the Twentieth Century. University of California. ISBN 0-520-20547-2.
- Brickner, Richard M. (1932). "An interpretation of frontal lobe function based upon the study of a case of partial bilateral frontal lobotomy". Research Publications. 13: 259–351.
- Brown, Edward M. (2000). "Why Wagner-Jauregg won the Nobel Prize for discovering malaria therapy for General Paresis of the Insane". History of Psychiatry. 11 (4): 371–82. doi:10.1177/0957154X0001104403.
- Cooper, Rachel (2014). "On deciding to have a lobotomy: either lobotomies were justified or decisions under risk should not always seek to maximise expected utility" (PDF). Medicine, Health Care and Philosophy. 17 (1): 143–54. doi:10.1007/s11019-013-9519-8. PMID 24449251.
- Cooter, Roger (2012). "Neuropatients in Historyland". In Jacyna, Stephen J.; Casper, Stephen T. (eds.). The Neurological Patient in History. Rochester, NY: University of Rochester Press. pp. 215–22. ISBN 978-1-58046-412-3.
- Day, Elizabeth (12 January 2008). "He was bad, so they put an ice pick in his brain." The Guardian.
- Department of Health, Education, and Welfare (23 May 1977). "Protection on Human Subjects: Use of Psychosurgery in Practice and Research: Report and Recommendations for Public Comment. Part 3" (PDF). Federal Register. 42 (99): 26317–32. Archived from the original on 18 June 2013.
- Deutsch, Albert (1948). Shame of the States. New York: Harcourt, Brace.
- Diefenbach, Gretchen; Diefenbach, Donald; Baumeister, Alan; West, Mark (April 1999). "Portrayal of lobotomy in the popular press: 1935–1960". Journal of the History of the Neurosciences. 8 (1): 60–69. doi:10.1076/jhin.8.1.60.1766. PMID 11624138. Archived from the original on 23 March 2010.
- Doby, T (1992). "Cerebral Angiography and Egas Moniz" (PDF). American Journal of Roentgenology. 359 (2): 364. doi:10.2214/ajr.159.2.1632357. PMID 1632357.
- El-Hai, Jack (2005). The Lobotomist: A Maverick Medical Genius and His Tragic Quest to Rid the World of Mental Illness. Wiley. ISBN 0-471-23292-0.
- Feldman, Burton (2001). The Nobel prize: a history of genius, controversy, and prestige. Arcade Publishing. ISBN 1-55970-592-2.
- Feldman, Robert P.; Goodrich, James T. (March 2001). "Psychosurgery: A Historical Overview". Neurosurgery. 48 (3): 647–57, discussion 657–59. doi:10.1097/00006123-200103000-00041. PMID 11270556.
- Finger, Stanley (2001). Origins of Neuroscience: A History of Explorations into Brain Function. Oxford: Oxford University Press. ISBN 978-0-19-514694-3.
- Ford, Paul J.; Henderson, Jaimie M. (2006). "Functional neurosurgical intervention: neuroethics in the operating rooms". In Illes, Judy (ed.). Neuroethics: defining the issues in theory, practice, and policy. Oxford University Press. ISBN 978-0-19-856721-9.
- Freberg, Laura A. (2010). Discovering Biological Psychology (2nd ed.). Belmont, California: Wadsworth. ISBN 978-0-547-17779-3.
- Freeman, Walter; Watts, James W. (1944). "Psychosurgery: An Evaluation of Two Hundred Cases over Seven Years". Journal of Mental Science. 90 (379): 532–37. doi:10.1192/bjp.90.379.532.
- Gabbard, Glen O.; Gabbard, Krin (1999). Psychiatry and the Cinema (2nd ed.). American Psychiatric Publishing, Inc. ISBN 978-0-88048-964-5.
- Gilyarovsky, Vasily (14 September 1950). "Учение Павлова – основа психиатрии" [Pavlov's teaching is the basis of psychiatry]. Медицинский работник [Health Worker] (in Russian) (37).
- Gilyarovsky, Vasily (1973). Избранные труды [Selected Works] (in Russian). Moscow: Медицина [Medicine]. p. 4.
- Goldbeck-Wood, Sandra (21 September 1996). "Norway compensates lobotomy victims". British Medical Journal. 313 (7059): 708–09. doi:10.1136/bmj.313.7059.708a. PMC 2352081. PMID 11644825.
- Green, Alexander; Astradsson, A.; Stacey, R.J.; Aziz, T.Z. (2010). "Functional and epilepsy neurosurgery". In Johnson, Reuben; Green, Alexander (eds.). Landmark Papers in Neurosurgery. Oxford University Press. ISBN 978-0-19-959125-1.
- Grenander, M.E. (1978). "Of Graver Import Than History: Psychiatry in Fiction" (PDF). Journal of Libertarian Studies. 2 (1): 29–44. PMID 11614766.
- Gross, Dominik; Schäfer, Gereon (2011). "Egas Moniz (1874–1955) and the "invention" of modern psychosurgery: a historical and ethical reanalysis under special consideration of Portuguese original sources". Neurosurgical Focus. 30 (2): 8. doi:10.3171/2010.10.FOCUS10214. PMID 21284454.
- Healy, David (January 2000). "Some continuities and discontinuities in the pharmacotherapy of nervous conditions before and after chlorpromazine and imipramine". History of Psychiatry. 11 (44): 393–412. doi:10.1177/0957154X0001104405.
- Heller, A. C.; Amar, A.P.; Liu, C.Y.; Apuzzo, M.L.J. (2006). "Surgery of the mind and mood: A mosaic of issues in time and evolution". Neurosurgery. 59 (4): 720–33, discussion 733-9. doi:10.1227/01.NEU.0000240227.72514.27. PMID 17038938.
- Hoenig, J. (1995). "Schizophrenia". In Berrios, German E.; Porter, Roy (eds.). A History of Clinical Psychiatry: The Origin and History of Psychiatric Disorders. Athlone. ISBN 0-485-24011-4.
- Joanette, Yves; Stemmer, Brigitte; Assal, Gil; Whitaker, Harry (1993). "From theory to practice: the unconventional contribution of Gottlieb Burckhardt to psychosurgery". Brain and Language. 45 (4): 572–87. doi:10.1006/brln.1993.1061. PMID 8118674.
- Kaempffert, Waldemar (24 May 1941). "Turning the Mind Inside Out". Saturday Evening Post. 213 (47): 18–19, 69–74.
- Kolin, Philip (Spring 1998). "Something Cloudy, Something Clear: Tennessee Williams's Postmodern Memory Play". Journal of Dramatic Theory and Criticism. 12 (2): 35–55.
- Kondratev, Fedor [Фёдор Кондратьев] (2010). Судьбы больных шизофренией: клинико-социальный и судебно-психиатрический аспекты [The fates of the ill with schizophrenia: clinico-social and forensico-psychiatric aspects] (PDF) (in Russian). Moscow: ЗАО Юстицинформ [Closed joint-stock company Justitsinform]. Archived (PDF) from the original on 1 February 2014.
- Kotowicz, Zbigniew (2005). "Gottlieb Burckhardt and Egas Moniz – Two Beginnings of Psychosugery" (PDF). Gesnerus. 62 (1/2): 77–101. doi:10.1163/22977953-0620102004. PMID 16201322. Archived from the original (PDF) on 15 December 2011.
- Kotowicz, Zbigniew (December 2008). "Psychosurgery in Italy, 1936–39". History of Psychiatry. 19 (4): 476–89. doi:10.1177/0957154X07087345. ISSN 0957-154X. PMID 19397090.
- Kragh, J.V. (2010). "Shock Therapy in Danish Psychiatry". Medical History. 54 (3): 341–64. doi:10.1017/S0025727300004646. PMC 2889500. PMID 20592884.
- Levin, Harvey S.; Eisenberg, Howard M. (1991). Frontal Lobe Function and Dysfunction. Oxford: Oxford University Press. ISBN 978-0-19-506284-7.
- Lichterman, B.L. (1993). "On the history of psychosurgery in Russia". Acta Neurochirurgica. 125 (1–4): 1–4. doi:10.1007/BF01401819. PMID 8122532.
- Maisel, Albert Q. (6 May 1946). "Bedlam 1946, Most U.S. Mental Hospitals are a Shame and a Disgrace". Life. Vol. 20.
- Manjila, S.; Rengachary, S.; Xavier, A. R.; Parker, B.; Guthikonda, M. (2008). "Modern psychosurgery before Egas Moniz: a tribute to Gottlieb Burckhardt". Neurosurgery Focus. 25 (1): 1–4. doi:10.3171/FOC/2008/25/7/E9. PMID 18590386.
- Macmillan, M. (2000). An Odd Kind of Fame: Stories of Phineas Gage. MIT Press. ISBN 0-262-13363-6.
- Mareke, Arends; Fangerau, Heiner (2010). "Deep brain stimulation in psychiatric disorders". In Fangerau, Heiner; Jörg, Fegert; Mareke, Arends (eds.). Implanted Minds: The Neuroethics of Intracerebral Stem Cell Transplantation and Deep Brain Stimulation. Verlag. ISBN 978-3-8376-1433-6.
- Martin, Douglas (30 January 2004). "Janet Frame, 79, Writer Who Explored Madness". The New York Times.
- Mashour, George A.; Walker, Erin E.; Martuza, Robert L. (2005). "Psychosurgery: Past, Present, and Future" (PDF). Brain Research Reviews. 48 (3): 409–19. doi:10.1016/j.brainresrev.2004.09.002. PMID 15914249. Archived from the original (PDF) on 17 January 2013.
- Meduna, L.J. (1985). "Autobiography of L.J. Meduna". Convulsive Therapy. 1 (1): 43–57. PMID 11940805.
- Moniz, Egas (1994). "PREFRONTAL LEUCOTOMY IN THE TREATMENT OF MENTAL DISORDERS (1937)". American Journal of Psychiatry 1844–1944. American Psychiatric Publishing. pp. 237–39. ISBN 978-0-89042-275-5.
- Nijensohn, DE (2012). "New evidence of prefrontal lobotomy in the last months of the illness of Eva Perón". World Neurosurgery. 77 (3–4): 582–90. doi:10.1016/j.wneu.2011.02.036. PMID 22079825.
- Noll, Richard (January 2007). The encyclopedia of schizophrenia and other psychotic disorders. Infobase Publishing. ISBN 978-0-8160-6405-2.
- Noyes, A.P.; Kolb, L.C. (1962). Modern clinical psychiatry. Philadelphia and London: W.B. Saunders.
- Ogren, K.; Sandlund, M. (2005). "Psychosurgery in Sweden 1944–1964". Journal of the History of the Neurosciences. 14 (4): 353–67. doi:10.1080/096470490897692. PMID 16338693.
- Partridge, Maurice (1950). Pre-frontal leucotomy. Oxford: Blackwell Scientific Publications.
- Pressman, Jack D. (2002). Last Resort: Psychosurgery and the Limits of Medicine. Cambridge: Cambridge University Press. ISBN 0-521-52459-8.
- Prior, Alex (6 February 2008). "Music's boy wonder: Composer, conductor, singer ... and he's only fifteen". The Independent.
- Porter, Roy (1999). The Greatest Benefit to Mankind: A Medical History of Humanity from Antiquity to the Present. Fontana Press. ISBN 0-00-637454-9.
- Puusepp, L. (1937). "Alcune considerazioni sugli interventi chirurgici nelle malattie mentali" [Some Considerations about Surgery in Mental Illness]. G Accad Med Torino. 100: 3–16.
- Raz, Mical (2009). "Psychosurgery, Industry and Personal Responsibility, 1940–1965". Social History of Medicine. 23 (1): 116–33. doi:10.1093/shm/hkp061.
- Raz, Mical (2013). The lobotomy letters: the making of American psychosurgery. University of Rochester Press. ISBN 978-1-58046-449-9.
- Reevy, Gretchen; Ozer, Yvette Malamud; Ito, Yuri (2010). Encyclopedia of Emotion. ABC-CLIO. ISBN 978-0-313-34576-0.
- Sakas, Damianos E.; Panourias, L.G.; Singounas, E.; Simpson, B.A. (2007). "Neurosurgery for psychiatric disorders: from the excision of brain tissue to the chronic electrical stimulation of neural networks". In Sakas, D.E.; Simpson, B.A. (eds.). Operative Neuromodulation. Functional Neuroprosthetic Surgery. Volume II: Neural Networks Surgery. Vol. 2. Springer. pp. 365–74. ISBN 978-3-211-33081-4.
- Shorter, Edward (1997). A History of Psychiatry: From the Era of the Asylum to the Age of Prozac. Wiley. ISBN 0-471-24531-3.
- Snyder, John; Steffen-Fluhr, Nancy (2012). Overcoming Depression Without Drugs: Mahler's Polka With Introductory Funeral March. AuthorHouse. ISBN 978-1-4685-4962-1.
- Shutts, David (1982). Lobotomy: resort to the knife. Van Nostrand Reinhold. ISBN 978-0-442-20252-1.
- Sargant, William; Slater, Elliot (1963). An Introduction to Physical Methods of Treatment in Psychiatry. Williams & Wilkins.
- Steck, A.J. (2010). "Milestones in the development of neurology and psychiatry in Europe". Schweizer Archiv für Neurologie und Psychiatrie. 161 (3): 85–89. doi:10.4414/sanp.2010.02153 (inactive 20 September 2026).
- Stone, James L. (2001). "Gottlieb Burckhardt – The Pioneer of Psychosurgery". Journal of the History of the Neurosciences. 10 (1): 79–92. doi:10.1076/jhin.10.1.79.5634. PMID 11446267.
- Suchy, Yana (2011). Clinical Neuropsychology of Emotion. Guilford Press. ISBN 978-1-60918-072-0.
- Swayze, V.W. (1995). "Frontal leukotomy and related psychosurgical procedures in the era before antipsychotics (1935–1954): a historical overview". American Journal of Psychiatry. 152 (4): 505–15. doi:10.1176/ajp.152.4.505. PMID 7900928. Archived from the original on 24 July 2008.
- Szasz, Thomas (2007). Coercion as Cure: A Critical History of Psychiatry. New Brunswick, New Jersey: Transaction. ISBN 978-0-7658-0379-5.
- Tierney, Ann Jane (April 2000). "Egas Moniz and the Origins of Psychosurgery: A Review Commemorating the 50th Anniversary of Moniz's Nobel Prize". Journal of the History of the Neurosciences. 9 (1): 22–36. doi:10.1076/0964-704X(200004)9:1;1-2;FT022. PMID 11232345.
- Tranøy, Joar (Winter 1996). "Lobotomy in Scandinavian psychiatry". The Journal of Mind and Behavior. 17 (1): 1–20. Archived from the original on 26 May 2008.
- Tranøy, Joar; Blomberg, Wenche (March 2005). "Lobotomy in Norwegian Psychiatry" (PDF). History of Psychiatry. 16 (1): 107–10. doi:10.1177/0957154X05052224. PMID 15981370. Archived from the original (PDF) on 3 December 2007.
- USSR Ministry of Health (1951). "Приказ МЗ СССР 1003 (9 декабря 1950)" [Order 1003 (9 December 1950)]. Невропатология и психиатрия [Neuropathology and Psychiatry] (in Russian). 20 (1): 17–18.
- Valenstein, Elliot S. (1990). "The Prefrontal Area and Psychosurgery". In Uylings, H.B.M.; Van Eden, C.G.; De Bruin, J.P.C.; Corner, M.A.; Feenstra, M.G.P. (eds.). The Prefrontal Cortex: Its Structure, Function and Pathology. Progress in Brain Research. Vol. 85. Amsterdam & New York: Elsevier. pp. 539–54. ISBN 978-0-444-81124-0.
- Valenstein, Elliot A. (1997). "History of Psychosurgery". In Greenblatt, Samuel H. (ed.). A History of Neurosurgery: In Its Scientific and Professional Contexts. Contributing editors Dagi, T. Forcht; Epstein, Mel H. Park Ridge, IL: The American Association of Neurological Surgeons. pp. 499–516. ISBN 978-1-879284-17-3.
- Weiss, Anthony P.; Rauch, Scott L.; Price, Bruce H. (2007). "Neurosurgical intervention for psychiatric illness: past, present and future". In Miller, Bruce L.; Cummings, Jeffrey L. (eds.). The Human Frontal Lobes: Functions and Disorders. Guilford Press. pp. 505–17. ISBN 978-1-59385-329-7.
- Whitaker, H.A.; Stemmer, B.; Joanette, Y. (1996). "A psychosurgical chapter in the history of cerebral localization: the six cases of Gottlieb Burkhardt". In Code, Christopher; Wallesch, C.-W.; Joanette Y.; Roch A. (eds.). Classic Cases in Neuropsychology. Hove: Psychology Press. pp. 275–304. ISBN 978-0-86377-395-2.
- Wiener, Norbert (1965) [First published 1948]. Cybernetics. MIT Press. ISBN 0-262-73009-X.
- Williams, Tennessee (1998). Suddenly Last Summer. Dramatists Play Service. ISBN 978-0-8222-1094-8.
- Wood, Jeffrey C.; Wood, Minnie (September 2008). Therapy 101: A Brief Look at Modern Psychotherapy Techniques & How They Can Help. New Harbinger Publications. ISBN 978-1-57224-568-6.
- Wright, Frank Leon (1947). Out of Sight, Out of Mind: A Graphic Picture of Present-day Institutional Care of the Mentally Ill in America, Based on More Than Two Thousand Eye-witness Reports. Philadelphia: Mental Health Foundation.

Online sources

- Dully, Howard (16 November 2005). ""My Lobotomy": Howard Dully's Journey" (podcast). NPR.
- Jansson, Bengt (29 October 1998). "Controversial Psychosurgery Resulted in a Nobel Prize". Nobel Media.
- Macmillan, Malcolm (1999–2012). "The Phineas Gage Information Page: Lobotomy". The Center for the History of Psychology, University of Akron, Ohio.
- "The Nobel Prize in Physiology or Medicine 1949 Walter Hess, Egas Moniz". Nobel Media. 2013.
- Sutherland, John (5 August 2004). "Should they de-Nobel Moniz?". The Guardian. Archived from the original on 10 January 2026.
