= Air fluid levels =

Air fluid levels may refer to:

- Bowel obstruction
- Hydropneumothorax, both air and liquid around the lungs
- Waters' view, a type of head X-ray that can show air fluid levels in the sinuses
