= Eugene W. Caldwell =

American engineer, radiographer and physician

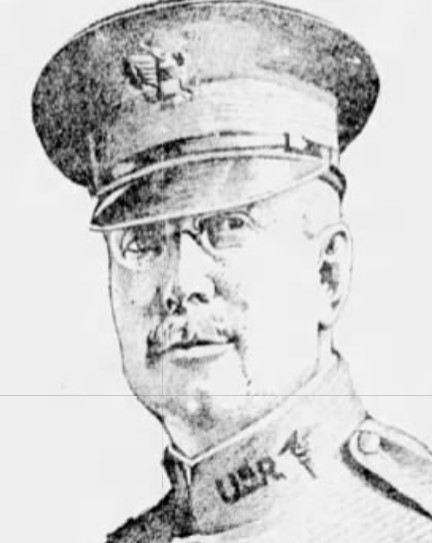
- Born: December 3, 1870; Savannah, Missouri
- Died: June 20, 1918 (aged 47); New York City
- Cause of death: Sepsis related to radiation injuries
- Occupations: Physician; radiographer; engineer
- Known for: Caldwell's view

Eugene Wilson Caldwell (1870–1918) was an American engineer, radiographer, and physician who conducted early work on the medical uses of X-rays. A native of Missouri, Caldwell studied engineering at the University of Kansas. After working as an engineer for five years, Caldwell became interested in X-rays in 1897, opening what may have been the first X-ray clinic in New York City. He taught radiography at University and Bellevue Hospital Medical College and later graduated with a medical degree from that institution.

Caldwell was president of the American Roentgen Ray Society (ARRS) in 1907, invented the first portable X-ray machine for use at a patient's bedside, and devised a positioning technique known as Caldwell's view that allowed for X-ray visualization of the sinuses. He also enhanced X-ray technology to reduce the exposure time required to obtain an image, created a stereoscopic device for X-rays so that they could show depth, and modified an existing stereoscopic fluoroscope for wartime use.

In 1917, Caldwell was named chief of the new roentgen ray department at Columbia University, making him one of the first radiology professors in the United States. Like many of those who performed early work with X-rays, Caldwell experienced serious health problems from radiation exposure. After developing radiation burns and radiation-related cancer, he underwent numerous surgeries, including an arm amputation, shortly before his death. He had been a captain in the Medical Reserve Corps, and he was promoted to major shortly before he died.

Caldwell brought credibility to the specialty of radiology at a time when X-rays were often taken by unlicensed personnel (such as photographers) or by physicians with no radiology training. He has been referred to as a "martyr to radiology" and as the "Dean of American Roentgenology". The ARRS established the annual Eugene W. Caldwell Lecture in 1920.

== Early life ==
Caldwell was born in Savannah, Missouri, to attorney William W. Caldwell and the former Camilla Kellogg. He showed an early interest in mechanical and electrical devices, having grown up in an era during which a number of electrical innovations had been significantly refined, including the electric light, telephones, and transatlantic telegraph cables. After high school, he went to the University of Kansas to study electrical engineering.

At Kansas, Caldwell joined the Phi Kappa Psi fraternity. He made friends with a number of students who became influential in their fields, including Herbert S. Hadley, who became the governor of Minnesota; Frederick Funston, who became an army general; and William Allen White, who became a newspaper editor and a leader in the Progressive movement. Caldwell rented a room from political activist Annie Le Porte Diggs. Caldwell even applied his electrical knowledge outside the classroom; once he connected a wire to his doorknob that would deliver a shock to uninvited guests, and sometimes he ran cables to his friends' boarding houses so they could communicate by telegraph.

Caldwell was inspired by Kansas physics professor Lucien Blake, who invited him on a trip to the eastern seaboard, where they worked together to develop submarine signaling technology. Blake and Caldwell conducted research together in Massachusetts every year of Caldwell's college career. Caldwell also worked with Blake in the summer after his 1892 graduation, but his attention was turning toward securing an engineering job. Even late in life, Caldwell said he was grateful for establishing a relationship with Blake.

== Work as an engineer ==
Using Blake's connections, Caldwell got a job offer from Bell Telephone Company in Boston in 1892, but he was not sure the position had good prospects, so he took a job installing electric railways with the J. G. White Company in Baltimore. In 1893, Caldwell joined Blake again in Kansas to work on telephony systems for lightships. Shortly thereafter, the United States Lighthouse Establishment took over this work from the university, but Caldwell stayed on the job through 1895, when he got a job with Metropolitan Telephone and Telegraph (later known as the New York Telephone Company).

Caldwell's work with the New York Telephone Company was described by biographer Percy Brown as "a modest position", but during that time Caldwell was inducted into the Sigma Xi honor society, which exposed him to a wide variety of contacts in science and engineering. One such connection was the editor of the New York Electrical Review, and their association led to Caldwell's publishing a series of articles on telephony. When his friend Fred Funston went down to Mexico to grow coffee in the spring of 1896, Caldwell seemed tempted to go with him to get away from the climate of the American Northeast, but he decided to stay in the United States to continue his work with telephony.

== Early X-ray work ==
Wilhelm Röntgen discovered X-rays in 1895, and Caldwell became fascinated with them soon thereafter. In 1897, he ran across a photographer who seemed eager to sell his X-ray equipment, and Caldwell bought the man out for what he thought was about one-fourth or one-fifth of the value of the equipment. The equipment turned out to be in poor condition, but by the end of the year Caldwell had repaired it and set up a small office on 53rd Street in Manhattan to take X-rays. This was likely the first X-ray laboratory in the city. Caldwell performed X-rays for physicians on a contract basis.

Soon after opening his private practice on 53rd Street, Caldwell relocated to the W. F. Ford Surgical Instrument Company in New York. This way he could advertise his X-ray services to the physicians visiting the surgical supply company. In 1898, Caldwell wrote to his parents that he was trying to sell his X-ray equipment and get a stable job, possibly with Blake; despite his apparent frustration, Caldwell persisted as a radiographer. His work gained attention at the 1899 New York Electrical Exposition, where he displayed an improved induction coil that allowed X-ray images to be obtained in a fraction of the usual exposure time. Caldwell himself had been experiencing dermatitis from prolonged X-ray exposure since his first year as a radiographer. His improvement to the induction coil became known as the Caldwell liquid interrupter.

Caldwell held a half interest in W. F. Ford starting in 1899. Around this time he began taking anatomy classes in the evenings as a special student at the College of Physicians and Surgeons so that he could better understand the medical implications of his X-ray work. In 1901, Caldwell began teaching radiography at the University and Bellevue Hospital Medical College, and he set up the Edward N. Gibbs Memorial X-Ray Laboratory at Bellevue Hospital.

In a fall 1901 article in the Electrical Review, Caldwell described a device he developed in his laboratory to add stereoscopy to X-rays. Until that time, an X-ray image might show that a foreign object (such as a bullet) was positioned to the right or left of a bone, but it could not show whether the object was in front of the bone or behind it. Caldwell's new X-ray tube worked on the principle of stereopsis, which occurs when slightly offset images are shown to a subject, one to each eye in rapid succession, and the resulting combination of images yields depth perception. The anticathodes in Caldwell's X-ray tube displayed sixty images per second. Through the use of a shutter system, the images were shown alternately to each eye at thirty images per second.

== Medical career ==
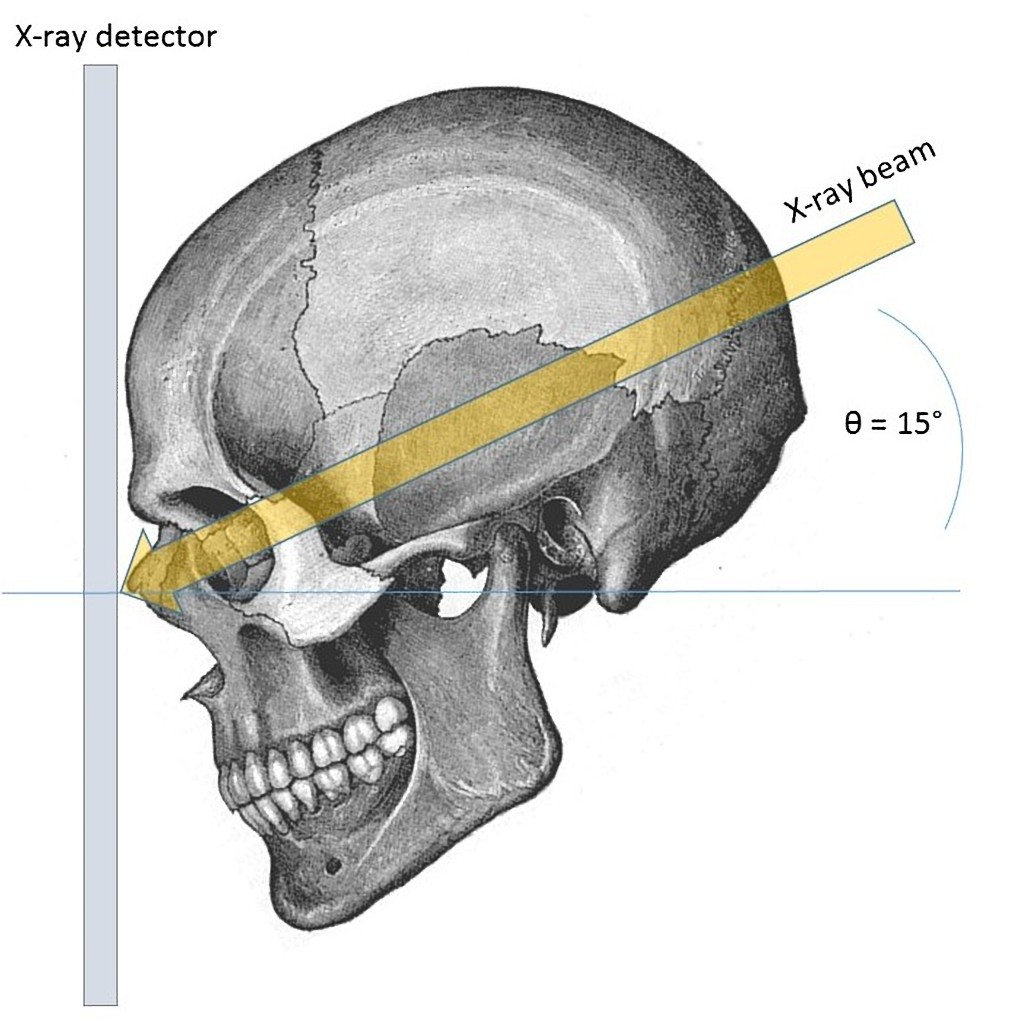
Positioning of the patient's head for Caldwell's view of the sinuses

Caldwell enrolled at Bellevue as a medical student in 1902; that year he was elected an associate of the American Institute of Electrical Engineers (AIEE). By 1903, Caldwell was so busy that he separated from W. F. Ford. With William A. Pusey, he published a textbook that year called The Practical Application of the Roentgen Ray in Therapeutics and Diagnosis.

Caldwell graduated from medical school in 1905. He had been driven to complete medical school by his belief that radiology should be undertaken by physicians rather than by photographers or other non-medical personnel. Later, in a speech to the New York State Medical Society, Caldwell described the difficulties created by the straightforward appearance of the X-ray image.

The almost irradicable impression of radiographs as a picture or photograph which anyone can properly examine, interpret and criticize, has been a great hindrance to the progress of roentgenology and its proper recognition. A radiograph is not a picture or even a photograph, except in the sense that photographic materials are used in its production. It is a special kind of projection and is essentially more like a slide for the microscope than a photographic view. Unfortunately, it may so much resemble a photograph that laymen and medical men alike are apt to regard it as a view and not suspect how incompletely and even how dangerous their overconfident interpretations of it may be.

Radiologist Robert N. Berk wrote that Caldwell was one of the first Americans to recognize the importance of medical training for radiographers. According to Berk, Caldwell set an example that took X-ray work above the "realm of photographers, electrologists, entrepreneurs, and charlatans". Berk said that Caldwell's innovations "laid the foundation for the infrastructure of diagnostic radiology that supports the specialty today." Caldwell devised the first motor-driven X-ray film viewer, the first portable X-ray machine for bedside use, and the first motor-driven, continuous-tilting X-ray table with an integrated fluoroscopy screen above it and an X-ray tube below it. In 1907, he described a new positioning technique (later known as Caldwell's view) for visualizing the sinuses with X-rays.

Caldwell served as the 1907 president of the American Roentgen Ray Society (ARRS). He was a member of several other organizations, including the American Medical Association, the New York Academy of Medicine, the New York Medical Society, the New York Roentgen Ray Society, the Philadelphia Roentgen Ray Society, the Roentgen Ray Society of London, and the Nu Sigma Nu medical fraternity.

In 1910, when New York City mayor William Jay Gaynor was shot, Caldwell was summoned to perform and interpret his X-rays. The next year, Harry Miles Imboden, an established physician with a newfound interest in X-rays, moved to New York City to become Caldwell's protégé. The two men worked together for the rest of Caldwell's career. Imboden later became the editor-in-chief of the American Journal of Roentgenology.

Around the time that Caldwell was becoming widely known as a radiologist, he began to show the signs of painful radiation injuries to his hands. In 1907, he visited a surgeon friend of his, who excised the wounds and performed skin grafts. Caldwell was aware of the deaths of some of his radiation-injured colleagues, including Mihran Kassabian of Philadelphia in 1910. However, he was optimistic about his own recovery.

Caldwell became one of the first radiology professors in the United States when he joined Columbia University as chief of the newly established roentgen ray department in 1917.

== Personal life ==
Caldwell lived on Park Avenue in New York City. He married the former Elizabeth Perkins in 1913.

== Illness and death ==
Caldwell was called to active duty during World War I in 1917. He had joined the Medical Reserve Corps several years earlier. (Note: The Lowell Milken Center for Unsung Heroes (n.d.) describes Caldwell as a captain in the Medical Reserve Corps in 1917. Caldwell's obituary in The New York Times states that he was a first lieutenant in the Medical Reserve Corps before the U.S. entered World War I. Both sources indicate that Caldwell was promoted to major in 1918.) Sir James Mackenzie Davidson had invented a stereoscopic device for fluoroscopy, and Caldwell worked on improving the device so that it would be more practical for military use. He wanted to go to Europe to experiment with the device, but an abrasion appeared on his hand that was ultimately diagnosed as cancer. Caldwell served his duty from New York so that he could seek treatment for his illness.

Caldwell consulted with the surgeon friend who had performed his skin grafts a decade earlier. That surgeon recommended a finger amputation but was not able to come to New York at the time, so another surgeon performed the procedure. When the cancer progressed, Caldwell's surgeon friend performed a more complete finger amputation and amputated a second finger. In mid-June 1918, the cancer was determined to have invaded the axillary lymph nodes, necessitating amputation of the arm at the shoulder. His stereoscopic fluoroscopy device had first been shipped to Europe around the time that his arm was amputated. The military promoted Caldwell to major around the same time.

Caldwell died on June 20, 1918, several days after undergoing the arm amputation. At a memorial service at the Campbell Funeral Church, speakers included U.S. Army physicist and X-ray expert J. S. Shearer, who said it was strange that someone "of high genius and kindly in all his traits ... should pass away while active in the greatest conflict civilization has known."

Noted pathologist James Ewing performed Caldwell's autopsy. Doctors had thought that the cancer metastasized to his lungs, but Ewing said Caldwell did not die of metastatic cancer and that there was no cancer in Caldwell's lungs. Instead, his death was from sepsis brought on by his surgeries and by radiation dermatitis.

The ARRS established the annual Eugene W. Caldwell Lecture in 1920. A biography of Caldwell was included in "American Martyrs to Radiology", a series of articles written in 1936 by radiologist Percy Brown and republished in 1995 in the American Journal of Roentgenology. Brown referred to Caldwell as the "Dean of American Roentgenology".

== See also ==
- Monument to the X-ray and Radium Martyrs of All Nations
