= Caldwell's view =

Radiographic view of the skull

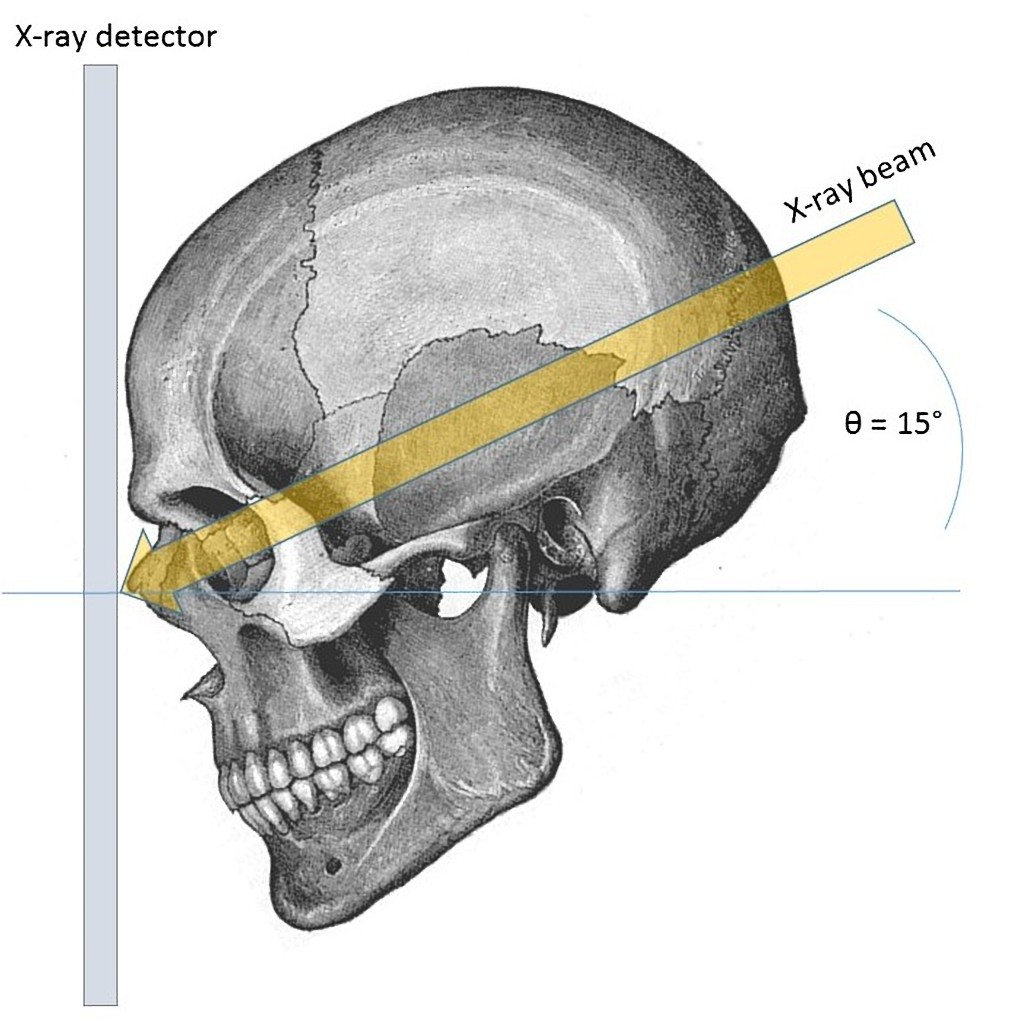
Method of obtaining Caldwell's view

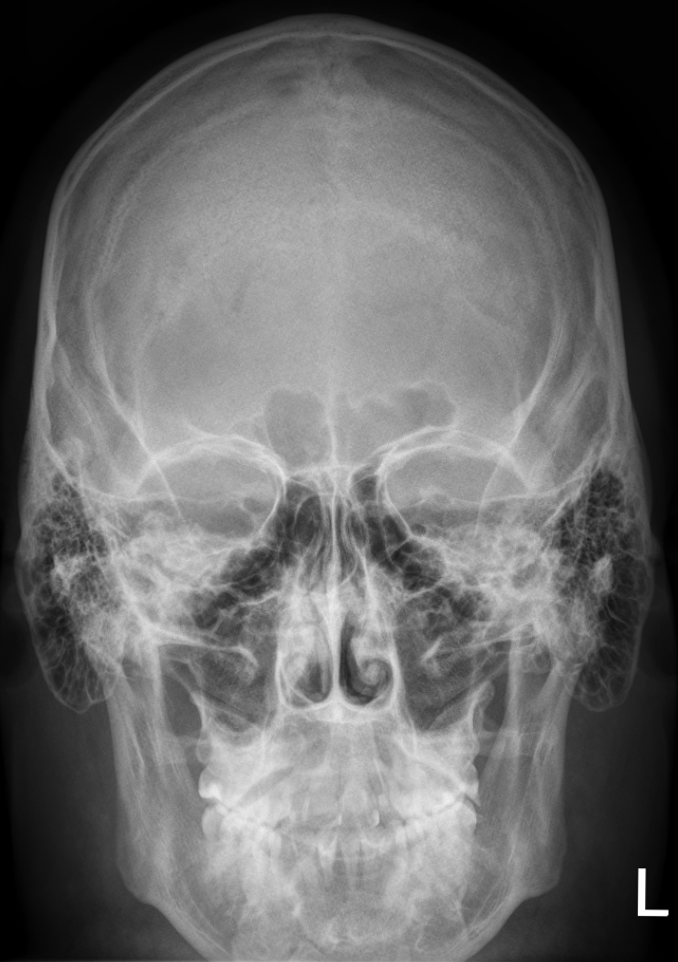
Caldwell skull

Caldwell's view (or occipitofrontal view) is a radiographic view of the skull where the X-ray plate is perpendicular to the orbitomeatal line. The rays pass from behind the head and are angled at 15° to the radiographic plate. It is commonly used to get better view of the ethmoid and frontal sinuses. It is named after the noted American radiologist Eugene W. Caldwell, who described it in 1907.

== Structures seen ==
- Frontal sinus
- Ethmoidal sinus
- Orbit
- Orbital rim
- Medial orbital wall
- Zygomatic bone
- Nasal bone
- Nasal septum
- Mandible

== Possible observations ==
Pathology	Observation
Normal	Different pneumatisation patterns of frontal sinus are observed in population.; The frontal sinuses can be asymmetric in normal individual.; Usually, frontal sinus shows radiolucent shadow and individual cells are made out, giving it a scalloping or clove-like appearance.
Chronic frontal sinusitis	Increased frontal sinus opacity.; Normal scalloping absent.
Osteoma	Marked radiopacity is seen. (Denser than bone)
Erythroblastic anemia	Hypopneumatisation (decreased pneumatisation) is common finding in sickle cell anemia and beta thalassemia.; Hyperpneumatisation (increased pneumatisation ) is common finding in Acromegaly and Sturge–Weber syndrome.
