= Ludvig Puusepp =

Estonian physician

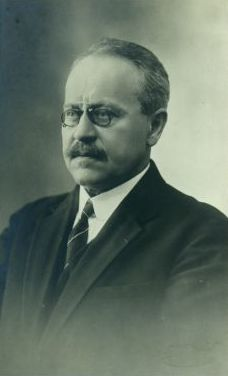
- Born: 3 December 1875; Kyiv
- Died: 19 October 1942 (aged 66); Tartu
- Education: St. Petersburg Medical Military Academy
- Medical career
- Profession: surgeon and researcher
- Field: neurosurgery
- Institutions: Women's Medical Institute; Military Medical Academy; University of Tartu; Hospital of Nervous Diseases
- Notable works: Die Tumoren des Gehirns

Ludvig Puusepp (also Ludwig Martynowicz Pussep or Pousep, Rus. Людвиг Мартынович Пуссеп; 3 December [O.S. 21 November] 1875 in Kyiv – 19 October 1942 in Tartu) was an Estonian surgeon and researcher and the world's first professor of neurosurgery.

== Early life ==
Ludvig Puusepp was born on 3 December 1875 in Kyiv to an Estonian father and a Polish-Czech mother. His father Martin Puusepp was a shoemaker who had migrated from Rakvere, Estonia to St. Petersburg where he met and married Victoria-Stephania Goebel.

Puusepp learned German at home and Russian in school; it was not until 1920 at age 44 that he learned Estonian. He continued to study languages including French, English, and Italian.

== Career ==
Puusepp undertook medical studies at the St. Petersburg Medical Military Academy from 1894 to 1899. Puusepp began training in neurology under Vladimir Bekhterev, and performed his first neurosurgical operation in 1899. He defended his medical doctoral dissertation on cerebral centers responsible for the regulation of sexual function in 1902. At the defense, psychologist Ivan Pavlov, then the head of the Physiologic Department of the Institute of Experimental Medicine, was his opponent.

=== Early career in Russia ===
After he was awarded the Doctor of Medical Science in 1902, Puusepp joined the faculty in neurology at the Women's Medical Institute. He was appointed the head of the Department of Surgical Neuropathology in the Clinic of Nervous Diseases. Here, various operations were performed for conditions such as, epilepsy, hydrocephalus, birth trauma, tumors of the brain and spinal cord, and injuries of the peripheral nervous system. In 1904 he presented his report 'On Indications and Contraindications for Trephination of the Skull in Epilepsy and Idiocy' at the Ninth Pirogov Congress held in 1904.

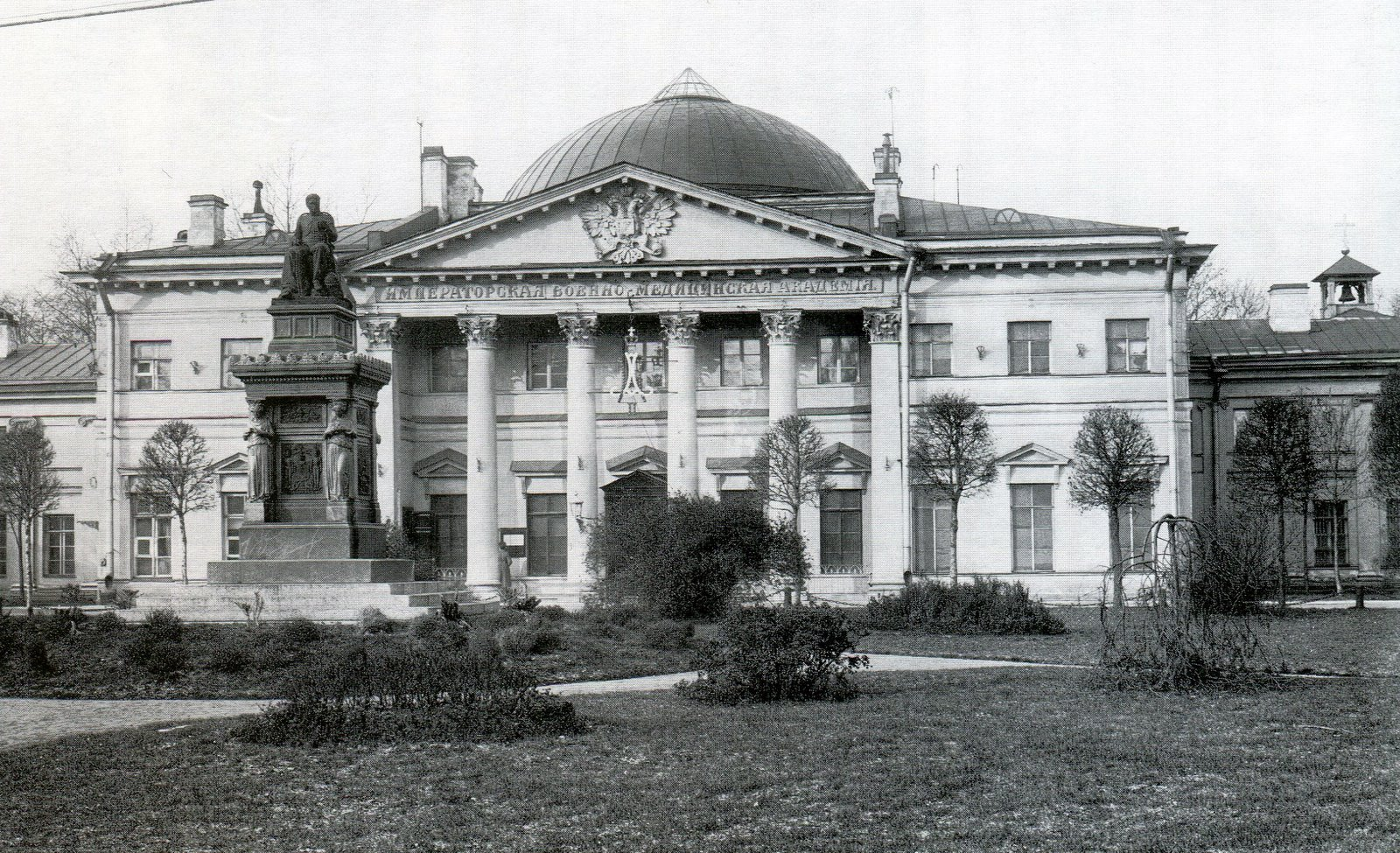
The Imperial Military Medical Academy in 1914 (as photographed by Karl Bulla)

From 1904 to 1905, he served as a medical officer in the Russo-Japanese war. Upon his return to St. Petersburg in 1907, he took the position of assistant professor at Military Medical Academy in the Department of Nervous and Mental Diseases. He also taught medical students as a member of the faculty of the academy. During this time, Puusepp and Bekhterev performed an experimental surgical procedure—frontal leucotomy, cutting association fibers in the frontal lobes—on three patients with manic-depressive psychosis with the aim of reducing psychomotor agitation. Dissatisfied with the results, they ceased further attempts at psychosurgery.

Bekhterev had become dissatisfied with the attempts of general surgeons to operate upon the nervous system and felt that neurology should become a surgical specialty like gynecology or ophthalmology: "neurologists will take a knife in their hands and do what they should do". He established an operating room in the Department of Nervous and Mental Diseases and a curriculum which emphasized neurological diagnosis. When the St. Petersburg Psycho-Neurological Institute later that year established a Chair of Surgical Neurology, Bekhterev's protégé Puusepp was named to head the new division. This independent department for neurological surgery was the first in the world, and when Puusepp was named full professor in 1910, he was the world's first professor of neurological surgery. During his tenure in St. Petersburg he published over 100 research papers. Puusepp served in the Russian Army Medical Service at the start of World War I, but was discharged and returned to teaching and academic leadership in St. Petersburg after being wounded. In 1917 he published a Russian-language neurology text, Principles of Surgical Neurology.

=== Later career in Estonia ===
In 1920, Puusepp relocated from St. Petersburg to Tartu, in the newly independent Estonia, to begin the most productive chapter of his career. He was granted Estonian citizenship on August 6, 1920. He was appointed Professor of Neurology at the University of Tartu and Director of the Hospital of Nervous Diseases (established 1921). Puusepp performed the first brain tumor operation in Estonia on April 30, 1921, for a right-sided cerebellopontine angle mass. Over the next twenty years he developed a strong neurological and neurosurgical teaching and clinical service with its own operating rooms and neuroradiology support. His forward-thinking approach to organizing the treatment, research, and educational missions of the institute was articulated in a plan drawn up in the 1920s. Until 1940 the Tartu clinic remained the only specialty neurological center in the Baltics, attracting patients from Finland, Latvia and Lithuania. Physicians from across Europe, including from Spain and Yugoslavia, traveled to Tartu to train with Puusepp.

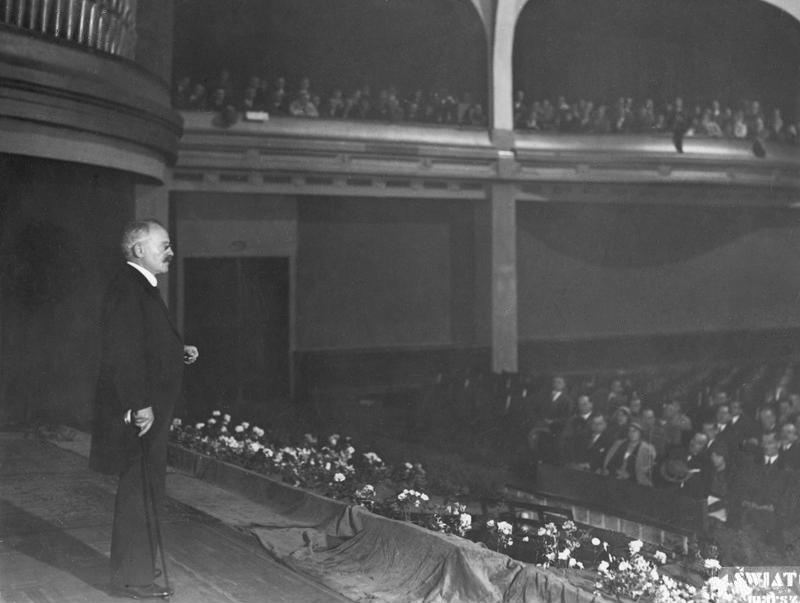
Ludvig Puusepp giving a lecture during his visit to Warsaw, Poland, in 1930.

In Tartu, Puusepp continued to research, innovate and publish. He was a founding editor of Eesti Arst (Estonian Physician). A 726-page work, Die Tumoren des Gehirns, was published in 1929, and then translated for a Spanish edition in 1931. Puusepp founded the medical journal Folia Neuropathologica Estoniana. Published from 1923 to 1939, it incorporated work not only from other Tartu researchers but also from international authors including Marburg, Freeman, his mentor Bekhterev, Walter Dandy, Walker, Guillain, and Alajouaine. The first volume of Die Neuropathologie chirurgische, a monumental 1400-page work, was released in 1931. The work remained unfinished due to the advent of World War II and Puusepp's failing health. His final work, Peaaju, tema töö ja tervishoid was published in Tartu in 1941.

Puusepp's contributions included published books on the surgery of brain tumors and the nervous system and papers on a diverse number of topics within neurosurgery including the description of Puusepp's sign—demonstrating abnormal reflex at the 5th toe —and Puusepp's operation for syringomyelia. He also refined the techniques of ventriculography, reviewed the surgical treatment of cerebral aneurysms, experimented with measuring intracranial pressure using a manometer, and investigated nerve compression due to herniated spinal disks. He was one of the founding members of the Estonian Neurological Society (Eesti Neuroloogide Selts) in 1922, and he later served as the association's president. Some authors have suggested that Puusepp, through the role he played in the advancement of the neurosurgical profession, was Harvey Cushing's counterpart in the Eastern hemisphere.

== Honors ==
Puusepp traveled widely as an invited lecturer and visiting professor. He was awarded honorary doctorates at the University of Padua (1922) and University of Vilnius (1929). In 1938 he was one of the first twelve Estonians granted membership in the Estonian Academy of Sciences. He was also a corresponding member of the Portuguese Academy of Sciences and of the French Academy of Surgery. After Estonia was occupied by the USSR in 1940, Puusepp was awarded the title of Merited Scientist. A granite and bronze monument designed by Endel Eduard Taniloo was erected in 1982 in west Tartu at Maarjamõisa. The current TÜ Kliinikum Närvikliinik is on Ludvig Puusepa street in Tartu.

== Family ==
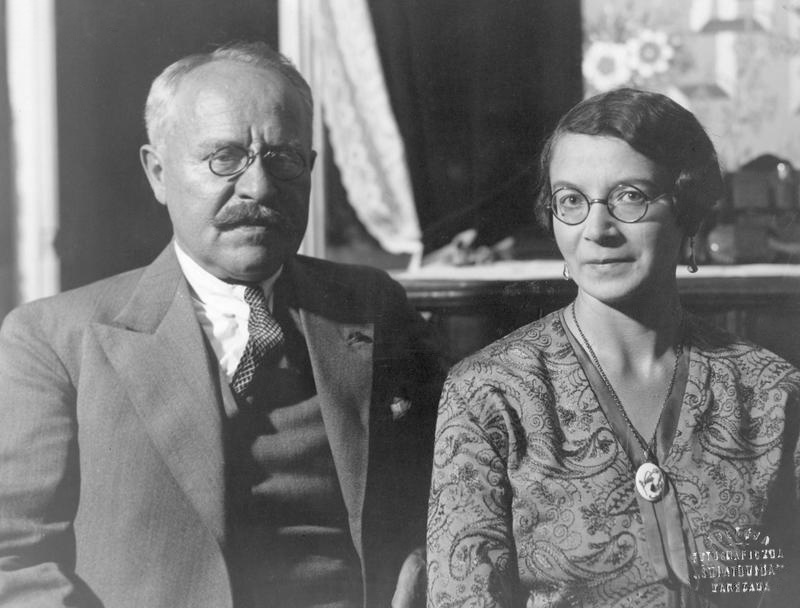
Ludvig Puusepp with his wife, Maria Küppar, in 1930.

Puusepp married Maria Kotšubei in 1906. After her death in 1929, he married Maria Küppar, and in 1932 their only daughter Liivia (who became a neurosurgeon herself) was born.

Puusepp's health began to decline in the second half of 1940, and he died of carcinoma of the stomach on 19 October 1942, in Tartu. He is buried in Tartu at Raadi cemetery.

== Works ==
- О влиянии рентгеновских лучей на возбудимость мозговой коры. Отчеты научных собраний врачей С.-Петербургской клиники душевных и нервных болезней за 1897–1898 гг. С.-Петербург: 1899.
- О мозговых центрах, управляющих эрекцией полового члена и семяотделением. С.-Петербург: 1902.; 180 pp., 3 plates
- Экспериментальное психологическое исследование умственной работы школьников-онанистов по сравнению с нормальными. Юбилейный сборник Трудов по психиатрии и невропатологии, посвящённый В.М. Бехтереву. Том второй. С.-Петербург: 1903.
- Нервно-сосудистый отек кожи. С.-Петербург: V. S. Ettinger, 1907.; 23 pp.
- Травматический невроз военного времени: клинический очерк на основании собственных наблюдений. Петроград: Практическая медицина, 1916.
- Основы хирургической невропатологии в 4-х частях. Т. 1: Периферическая нервная система. Петроград: 1917.; 38 pp.
- Der Blutkreislauf im Gehirn beim Koitus. Dorpat: 1922?.
- Noorus ja eluväärtus: (noorsoo enesetapmiste andmetel). s.n.: 1926.
- Symptomatologie et traitement chirurgical des lésions de la moelle épinière. J. G. Krüger, 1926; 39 pp.
- (With Endel Kirsimägi): Hüpnoos ja suggestioon arstiteaduses ja seltskondlikus elus. s.n.: 1927.
- К вопросу об оперативном удалении опухолей спинного мозга. Ленинград : Государственное издательство, 1928
- Die Tumoren des Gehirns; ihre Symptomatologie, Diagnostik und operative Behandlung auf Grund eigener Beobachtungen. Tartu: 1929.
- К вопросу о доброкачественных кистовидных опухолях париетальной доли. Эстония, 193?
- Los tumores del cerebro: Su sintomatologia, diagnóstico y tratamiento operatorio. Barcelona: Salvat Editores, 1931; 661 pp.
- Über die Entwicklung der chirurgischen Neuropathologie während der letzten 10 Jahre, nach den Daten der Nervenklinik der Universität Tartu-Dorpat. [Tartu], [1932]
- Chirurgische Neuropathologie. Bd. 1, Die peripherischen Nerven. Tartu (Dorpt): Krüger, 1932.
- Chirurgische Neuropathologie. Bd. 2, Das Rückenmark. Tartu (Dorpat): Krüger, 1933.
- Über Hirnmeningiome in Einzeldarstellungen : (Symptomatologie, Diagnostik und operative Behandlung auf Grund eigener Beobachtungen). Tartu: J. Mällo, 1935.
- Chirurgische Neuropathologie. Bd. 3. T. 1, Das Gehirn. Tartu: Krüger, 1939.
- Peaaju, tema töö ja tervishoid. Teaduslik Kirjandus, 1941.; 70 pp.
