= William Pusey =

William Pusey may refer to:

- William A. Pusey (1865–1940), American physician
- William Henry Mills Pusey (1826–1900), U.S. Representative from Iowa
