= ARRS =

ARRS may refer to:

- Aerospace Rescue and Recovery Squadron, a former aviation unit of the United States Air Force
- American Roentgen Ray Society
- Association of Road Racing Statisticians
