= John Y. Hill =

American politician

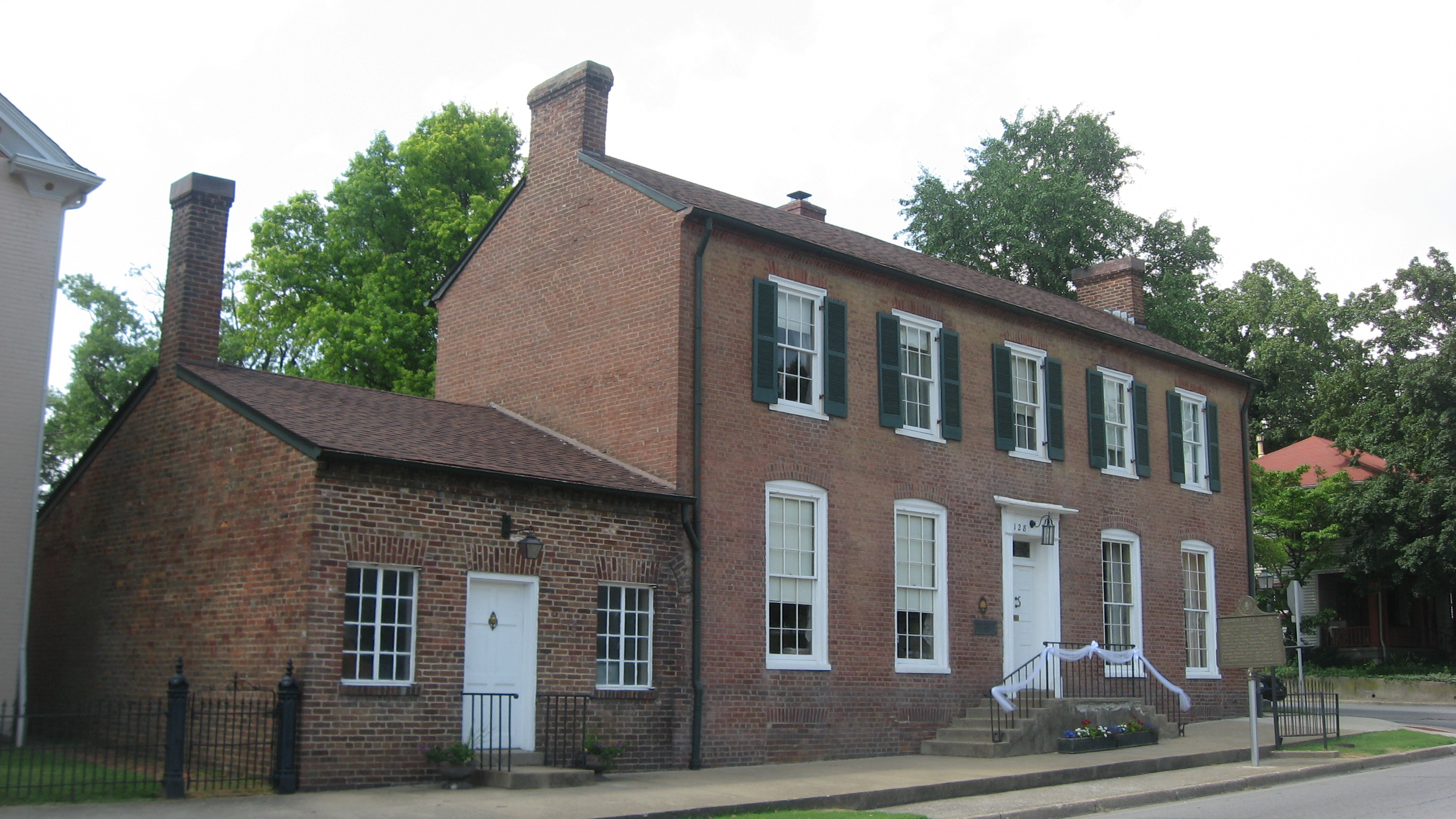
Hill House in Elizabethtown, Kentucky, built 1825.

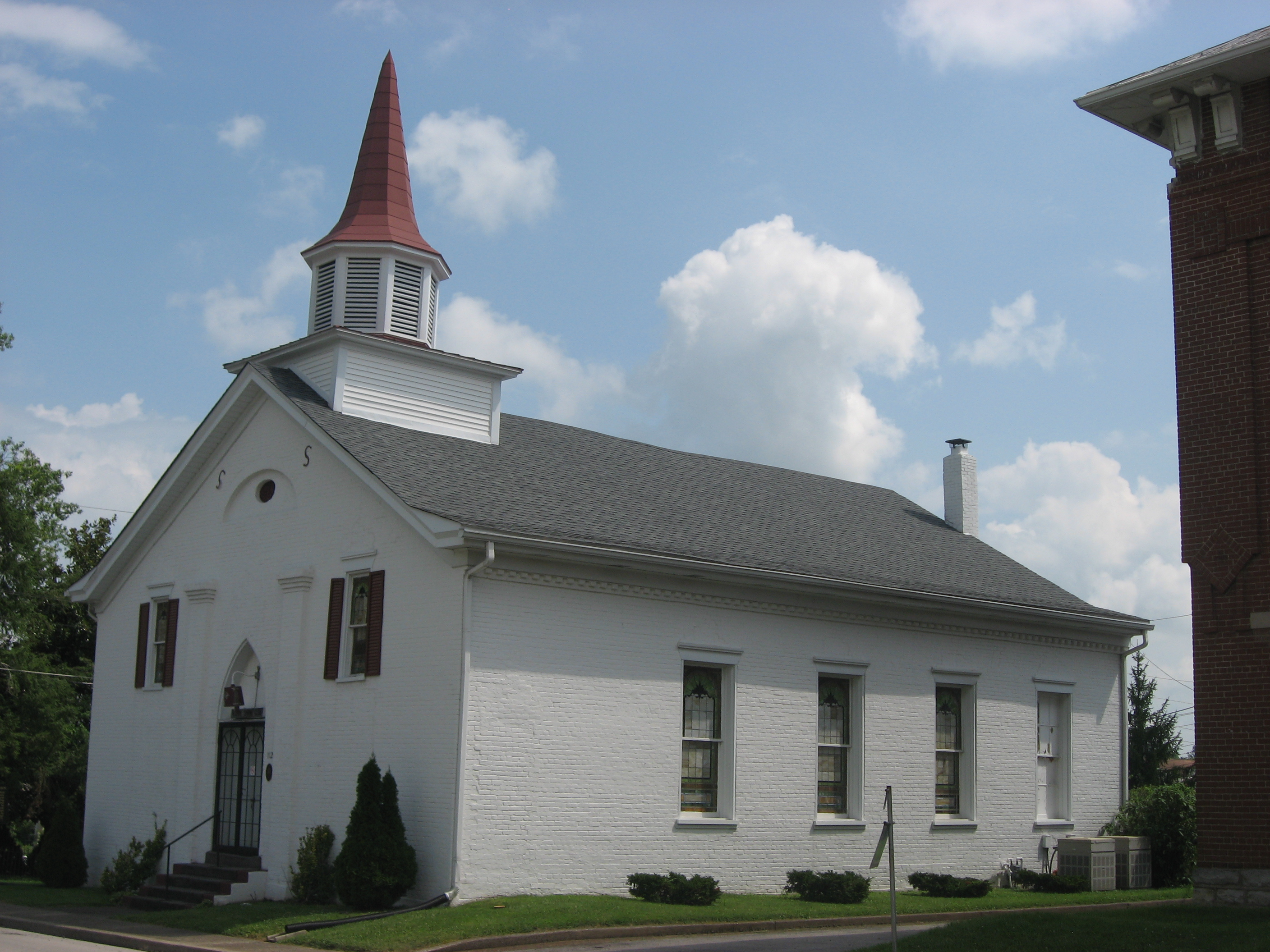
First Baptist Church (Elizabethtown, Kentucky)

John Y. Hill (August 14, 1799 - August 2, 1859) was an American builder, tailor, bricklayer, cattle herder, hotel operator, and state legislator in Kentucky. He was born in Shepherds Town, Virginia in 1799 and moved to Elizabethtown, Hardin County, Kentucky, in approximately 1818. He worked as a tailor from approximately 1818 and into the 1830s. He also worked as a bricklayer and builder from 1825 and into the 1840s. He also served in the Kentucky House of Representatives. In approximately 1825, he built the Hill House (later known as Brown Pusey House), a Federal-style building in Elizabethtown. In the 1840s, he began operating Hill House as a boarding house. Hill died of pneumonia in August 1859. His second wife, Rebecca Davis Stone Hill, continued to operate Hill House (sometimes referred to during her operation as "Aunt Beck Hill's Boarding House") until she died in 1882. General George Armstrong Custer lived at the house from 1871 to 1873.

A number of Hill's works as a builder are listed on the National Register of Historic Places.

Works include (with attribution):

- William Bland House, KY 222, 2.5 mi. W of Glendale, Glendale, Kentucky (Hill, John Y.), NRHP-listed
- Hill House (1825), aka Brown Pusey House Community Center, 128 N. Maine St., Elizabethtown, Kentucky (Hill, John Y.), NRHP-listed
- First Baptist Church, 112 W. Poplar St., Elizabethtown, Kentucky (Hill, John Y.), NRHP-listed
- McKinney-Helm House (1825), 218 W. Poplar St., Elizabethtown, Kentucky (Hill, John Y.), NRHP-listed
- Horatio Wintersmith House, 221 W. Poplar St., Elizabethtown, Kentucky (Hill, John Y.), NRHP-listed
