= First Baptist Church (Elizabethtown, Kentucky) =

Historic church in Kentucky, United States

- U.S. National Register of Historic Places
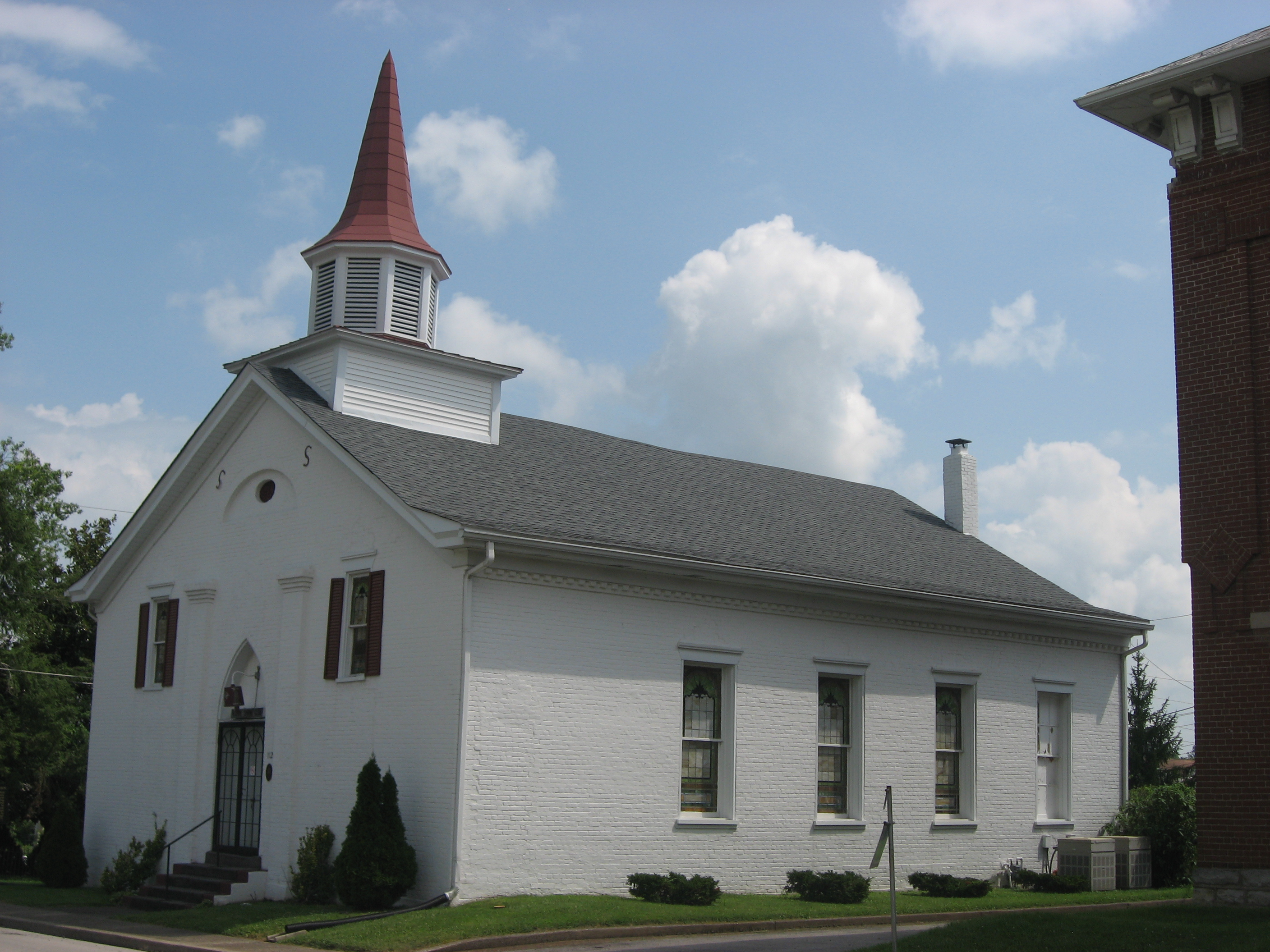
- Front and side of the church

- Location within Kentucky Location within the United States
- Location: 112 W. Poplar St., Elizabethtown, Kentucky
- Coordinates: 37°41′40″N 85°51′30″W
- Area: 0.5 acres (0.20 ha)
- Built: 1855
- Architect: Hill, John Y.
- NRHP reference No.: 74000879
- Added to NRHP: December 31, 1974

The First Baptist Church in Elizabethtown, Kentucky, originally known as Severn's Valley Baptist Church, is a historic church at 112 W. Poplar Street. It was built in 1855 and was a work of John Y. Hill, a tailor turned carpenter/builder. It was added to the National Register of Historic Places in 1974.

It is 42 by 55 feet (13 m × 17 m) in plan, built of handmade brick. Its pointed arch entrance is sided by brick pilasters.
