= Germán Elías Berríos =

Peruvian psychiatrist

Germán Elías Berríos FMedSci, FRCPsych (17 April 1940) is a professor of Psychiatry at Cambridge University in the United Kingdom.

== Life ==
Berrios was born in Tacna, Peru, and studied medicine and philosophy at the University of San Marcos. He read Psychology, Philosophy and Physiology (PPP) at Corpus Christi College, Oxford, where he was a scholar by examination and obtained a BA in 1970. Then he trained in history and philosophy of science under A. Crombie, C. Webster and R. Harré earning a D.Phil. Sci. in 1972 and a MA in 1974. Between 1973 and 1976 he was a Lecturer in Psychiatry at the University of Leeds. In 1977 he obtained a M.A. from Robinson College, Cambridge where he is now a Life-Fellow.

Berrios started teaching at Cambridge University in 1977 where he occupied the first chair of the Epistemology of Psychiatry. He is a Fellow of the Royal College of Psychiatrists of the UK, the British Psychological Society, and the Academy of Medical Sciences. In 1989, he founded with Roy Porter the international journal History of Psychiatry of which he remains the editor.

== Work ==
His research has centred on the psychiatric complications of neurological disease and the history, structure and epistemological power of descriptive psychopathology. A Festschrift about his work was published in 2020.

== Publications ==
Berrios has published 14 books and more than 400 papers on the clinical, historical and philosophical aspects of neuropsychiatry, descriptive psychopathology, and the hermeneutics of mental symptoms.

== Awards ==
He holds degrees honoris causa from the University of Heidelberg (Germany); the Autonomous University of Barcelona (Spain); the University of Chile (Chile).; the University of Buenos Aires, Universidad Nacional Mayor de San Marcos (Perú), Universidad Nacional de Córdoba (Argentina) . In 2006, a Chair in Descriptive Psychopathology carrying his name was established at the University of Antioquia (Medellín, Colombia). In 2008 the Ramón y Cajal Award by the International Neuropsychiatric Association;; in 2010 he was made Honorary Fellow by the Royal College of Psychiatrists of the UK, in 2016 he received a Life-Achievement Award from La Sociedad Española de Psicogeriatría, and the Honorio Delgado Medal from the Instituto Nacional de Salud Mental Honorio Delgado – Hideyo Noguchi, Perú. In 2018 he received the ‘Maestro Laguna‘ award from the University of Alcalá (Madrid, Spain). In 2022, The British Neuropsychiatry Association distinguished him with its “Life Achievement Award”.

In 2007 he was awarded Grand Officier of the Order of the Sun by the Peruvian Government.
