= William Bland House =

Historic house in Kentucky, United States

- U.S. National Register of Historic Places
- Location within Kentucky Location within the United States
- Nearest city: Glendale, Kentucky
- Coordinates: 37°36′50″N 85°58′15″W
- Area: 1.2 acres (0.49 ha)
- Built: 1850
- Built by: Hill, John Y.
- Architectural style: Federal
- MPS: Hardin County MRA
- NRHP reference No.: 88001734
- Added to NRHP: October 4, 1988

The William Bland House near Glendale, Kentucky was built in 1850 by builder John Y. Hill. It was listed on the National Register of Historic Places in 1988.

It is a two-story central passage plan brick house with elements of Federal style including its main entrance with three sidelight windows on each side and six transom windows, the only such entrance in Hardin County. The brick is laid in Flemish bond. It has brick dentils at its eaves. Its log kitchen was originally separate but was connected in c.1900.
