= Brown Pusey House Community Center =

Historic house in Kentucky, United States

- U.S. National Register of Historic Places
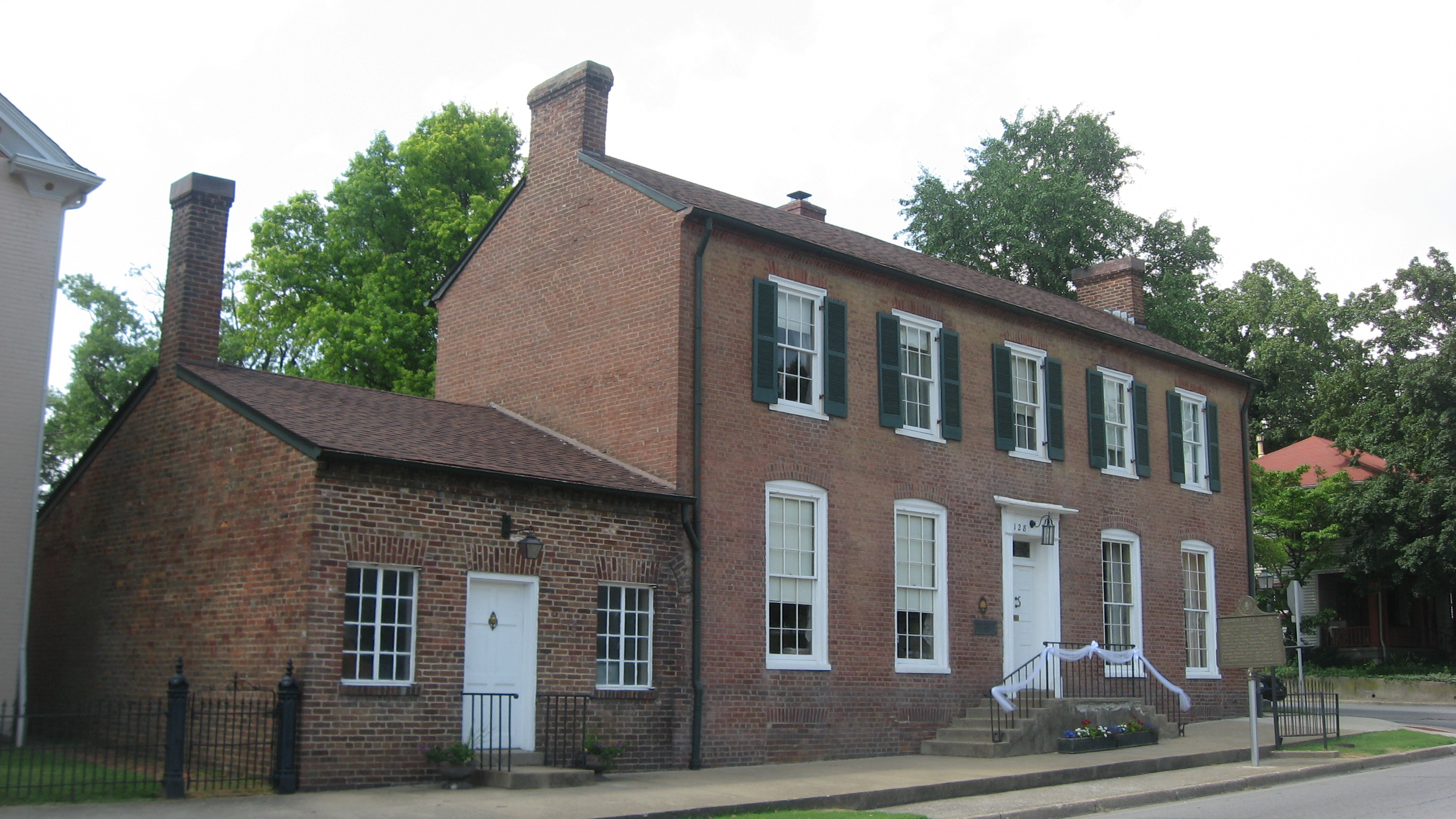

- Location within Kentucky Location within the United States
- Location: 128 N. Maine St., Elizabethtown, Kentucky
- Coordinates: 37°41′39″N 85°51′25″W
- Area: 9.9 acres (4.0 ha)
- Built: 1825
- Built by: Hill, John Y.
- Architectural style: Georgian, Federal
- NRHP reference No.: 74000878
- Added to NRHP: July 12, 1974

The Brown Pusey House, now the Brown Pusey House Community Center, is a historic home built by John Y. Hill at 128 N. Maine St. in Elizabethtown, Kentucky. It was built in 1825 and includes Georgian and Federal architecture. It has also been known as Hill House and as Aunt Beck's. It was listed on the National Register of Historic Places in 1974; the listing includes just one contributing building but a 9.9-acre (4.0 ha) area. It has served as a hotel and also included the Pusey Room Museum.

The house is named for William A. Pusey and his brother Alfred Brown Pusey, who restored it in the 1920s and donated it to the community.
