= William A. Pusey =

American physician

William Allen Pusey
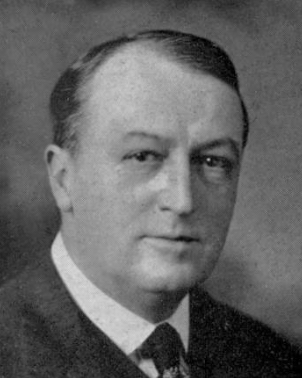
- Born: December 1, 1865; Elizabethtown, Kentucky
- Died: August 29, 1940 (aged 74); Chicago, Illinois
- Education: Vanderbilt University; NYU School of Medicine
- Medical career
- Profession: Medicine
- Field: Dermatology
- Institutions: College of Physicians and Surgeons of Chicago
- Sub-specialties: Syphilis

William Allen Pusey (December 1, 1865 – August 29, 1940) was an American physician and president of the American Medical Association. He advocated for the use of radiation in the treatment of skin diseases and he was an expert in the study of syphilis. Pusey authored several books, including the first history of dermatology written in English.

== Early life ==
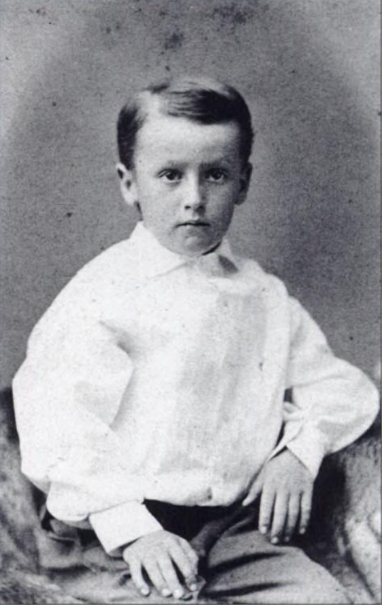
William A. Pusey as a child, circa 1870s

Pusey was born in Elizabethtown, Kentucky. His ancestors were Quakers who traveled to the United States with William Penn. He was the son of a local physician with a successful practice. Pusey graduated from Vanderbilt University in 1885 and New York University School of Medicine in 1888. Interested in the specialty of dermatology, he went to Europe to train and practice for a while.

Upon returning to the United States, he briefly took over his father's practice in Elizabethtown. He also worked as an examiner for the New York Life Insurance Company.

== Career ==
In 1894, Pusey became the head of the new dermatology department at the College of Physicians and Surgeons of Chicago ("P&S"). He served in that capacity until 1915, also treating patients at Cook County Hospital. He was an early proponent of treating skin conditions with radiation. He also became an expert in the treatment of syphilis and criticized the widespread use of arsenic in the management of the condition. Pusey also wrote the first English-language history of dermatology.

Pusey was a charter member of the Chicago Dermatological Society. He was also president of the American Medical Association (AMA) from 1924 to 1925. During his term as AMA president, Pusey decried the costs associated with medical education. He criticized the fact that medical schools remained out of reach for those from poor rural backgrounds, which he said resulted in physician shortages in many rural areas.

== Personal life ==
Pusey and his brother purchased a historic home in Elizabethtown, restored it and donated it to the community in the 1920s. The home became known as the Brown-Pusey House. Pusey was married to the former Sallie W. Cunningham.

== Later life ==
After Pusey retired from P&S, the school named him an honorary professor. He spent 16 years as the editor of the Archives of Dermatology and Syphilology.

In 1940, Pusey died at his Chicago home.

== Works ==
- Pusey, W. A., Caldwell, E. W. (1903). The practical application of the Röntgen rays in therapeutics and diagnosis. Philadelphia: W. B. Saunders.
- Pusey, W. A. (1907). Principles and practice of dermatology. New York: D. Appleton & Co.
- Pusey, W. A. (1921). The Wilderness Road to Kentucky – Its Location and Features. New York. George H. Doran Company.

== See also ==
- List of presidents of the American Medical Association
