= Orbitomeatal line =

Line on the skull

The orbitomeatal (OM) line is a positioning line used in radiography of the skull. It passes through the outer canthus of the eye and the center of the external auditory meatus. It is used for positioning the patient for different radiographic views including Water's view, Perorbital view, Lateral view, and others.
