= Maarjamõisa =

Neighbourhood of Tartu, Estonia

Coordinates: 58°22′3.42″N 26°41′37.74″E

- Neighbourhood of Tartu
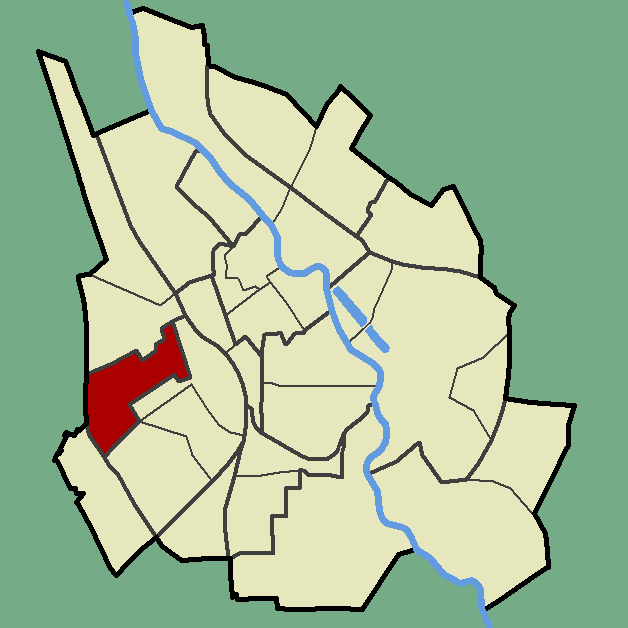
- Location of Maarjamõisa in Tartu.
- Country: Estonia
- County: Tartu County
- City: Tartu

Area
  - Total: 1.13 km^{2} (0.44 sq mi)

Population (31.12.2013)
  - Total: 382
  - Density: 338/km^{2} (876/sq mi)

Maarjamõisa (Estonian for "Mary's Manor") is a neighbourhood of Tartu, Estonia. It's located about 2 km southwest of the city centre, just north of Riia street (Jõhvi–Tartu–Valga road, E264). With a population of 382 as of 31 December 2013, Maarjamõisa is the smallest neighbourhood of Tartu. The area is 1.13 km^{2} (0.44 mi^{2}).

Maarjamõisa is best known as a medical centre, because most of the buildings of Tartu University Clinic are located in Maarjamõisa, including all of the Faculty of Medicine of the University of Tartu. Recently, other faculties of the university have opened their new buildings there, such as the Technology Institute, the Biomedical Center (Biomedicum), the Chemistry building (Chemicum), and the Physics building (Physicum).
