= History of Psychiatry (journal) =

- Discipline: Psychiatry
- Language: English
- Edited by: Eric J. Engstrom

Publication details
- History: 1990-present
- Publisher: SAGE Publications
- Frequency: Quarterly
- Impact factor: 0.205 (2010)

Standard abbreviations
- ISO 4: Hist. Psychiatry

Indexing
- ISSN: 0957-154X (print); 1740-2360 (web)
- LCCN: 90023376
- OCLC no.: 22167445

Links
- Journal homepage; Online access; Online archive

History of Psychiatry is a peer-reviewed academic journal covering psychiatry. It is published quarterly by SAGE Publications. The journal's Editor-in-chief is Professor G. E. Berrios (University of Cambridge).

== Scope ==
The aim of History of Psychiatry is to publish articles and analysis across the history of the field of mental illness and the various forms of medicine and psychiatry, as well as aspects of the cultural response and social policy, which have evolved to understand and treat it.

== Abstracting and indexing ==
The journal is abstracted and indexed in both SCOPUS and the Social Sciences Citation Index. According to the Journal Citation Reports, its 2010 impact factor is 0.205, ranking it 23rd out of 26 journals in the category "History of Social Sciences" and 102nd out of 107 journals in the category 'Psychiatry'.
