= Journal of the History of the Neurosciences =

- Discipline: History of Medicine, Neuroscience
- Language: English
- Edited by: P.J. Koehler, P. Eling, F. W. Stahnisch

Publication details
- History: 1992-present
- Publisher: Taylor & Francis (England)
- Frequency: Quarterly
- Impact factor: 0.633 (2016)

Standard abbreviations
- ISO 4: J. Hist. Neurosci.

Indexing
- ISSN: 0964-704X (print); 1744-5213 (web)
- OCLC no.: 28180217

'The Journal of the History of the Neurosciences is a peer-reviewed academic journal covering the history of neuroscience. Established in 1992, it publishes research on the historical development of the basic and applied neurosciences.

The journal contains a combination of original articles, book reviews, and two unique types of columns called "NEUROwords" and the "Neurognostics" Questions and Answers.
