= Hydropneumothorax =

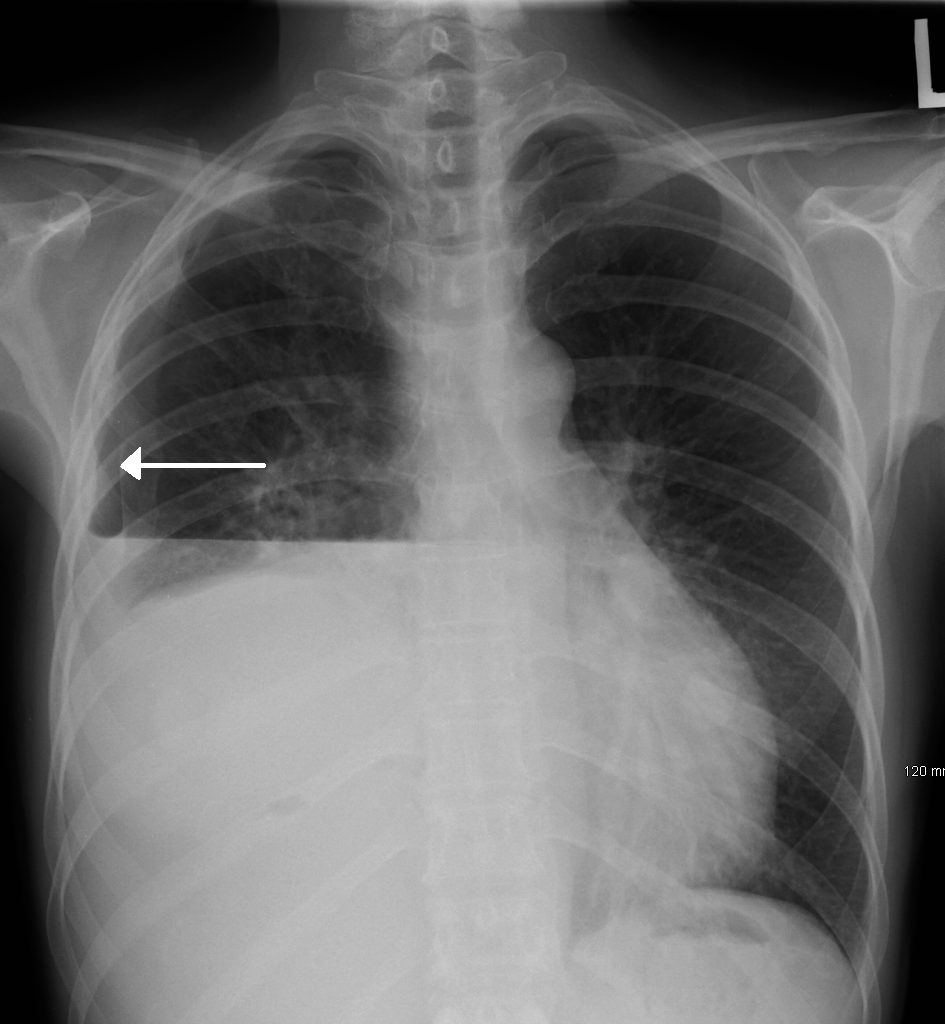
- A hydropneumothorax with a white arrow pointing to the lung's pleura
- Specialty: Emergency medicine

Hydropneumothorax is defined as the presence of both air and fluid within the pleural space. An upright chest x-ray will show air fluid levels. The horizontal fluid level is usually well defined and extends across the whole length of one of the hemithorax.

== Signs and symptoms ==
This can be remembered by the 4 'S': straight line dullness, shifting dullness, splash, sound of coin.

== Causes ==
- Iatrogenic: Introduction of air during pleural fluid aspiration in effusion
- Presence of a gas-forming organism
- Thoracic trauma

== Diagnosis ==
Diagnosis can be via CXR. CT is better for outlining borders of air-fluid levels, however, CT has a greater radiation exposure.

Ultrasound imaging has also proven to be a useful tool for hydropneumothorax diagnoses by looking for the absence of the characteristic "curtain sign" usually seen in ultrasound images at the base of healthy lungs.

== Treatment ==
Treatment includes intercostal drainage (ICD) of fluid and air and treatment of underlying conditions.
