= Waters' view =

Radiographic view

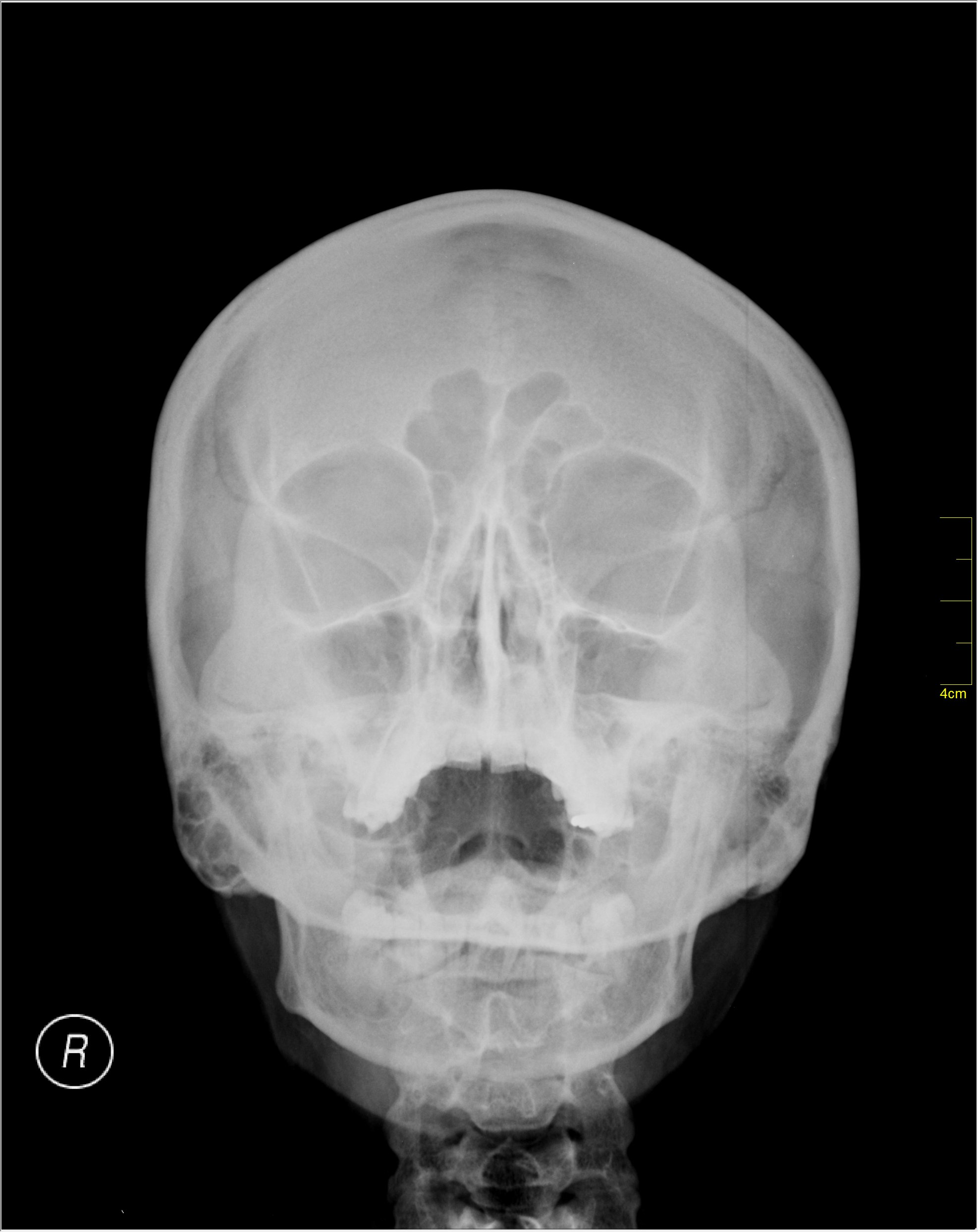
- A Waters' view radiograph showing the paranasal sinuses
- Specialty: Radiology

Waters' view (also known as the occipitomental view or parietoacanthial projection) is a radiographic view of the skull. It is commonly used to get a better view of the maxillary sinuses. An x-ray beam is angled at 45° to the orbitomeatal line. The rays pass from behind the head and are perpendicular to the radiographic plate. Another variation of the waters places the orbitomeatal line at a 37° angle to the image receptor. It is named after the American radiologist Charles Alexander Waters.

== Uses ==
=== Structures observed ===
Waters' view can be used to best visualise a number of structures in the skull.

- Maxillary sinuses.
- Frontal sinuses, seen with an oblique view.
- Ethmoidal cells.
- Sphenoid sinus, seen through the open mouth.
- Odontoid process, where if it is just below the mentum, it confirms adequate extension of the head.

The Waters' view may not show the frontal sinus in detail.

=== Interpretation of results ===
| Pathology | Observation |
|---|---|
| None (Normal) | Odontoid process lies exactly below mentum.; Maxillary sinuses are more radiolucent than orbits. |
| Maxillary sinusitis | Differentiating pathology in maxillary sinus: Maxillary sinus shows radiopacity.; Mucous membrane shows thickening.; Air-fluid level may be observed if the radiograph is taken in "head-up" position. It is not seen in radiograph taken in lying down position. The concavity of fluid opacity points upwards. |
| Polyp | Maxillary sinus shows radiopacity; which is present despite the position in which the radiograph is taken.; Usually, the radiopacity has convexity pointing upward. |
| Malignancy | Onhgren's line: Sinus is radioopaque.; Sometimes, destruction of walls of sinus is seen and is diagnostic of malignancy; Distance between antero-lateral wall of maxilla and coronoid process of the mandible is measured. If it is increased on one side, it indicates involvement of infratemporal fossa by the malignancy. This is called Handousa's sign. Prognosis of malignancy is determined by position of tumour on basis Onhgren's line. |

== Procedure ==
Method of obtaining Waters' view

Typically, the x-ray beam is angled at 45° to the orbitomeatal line. Another variation of the waters places the orbitomeatal line at a 37° angle to the image receptor, or 30°.

== History ==
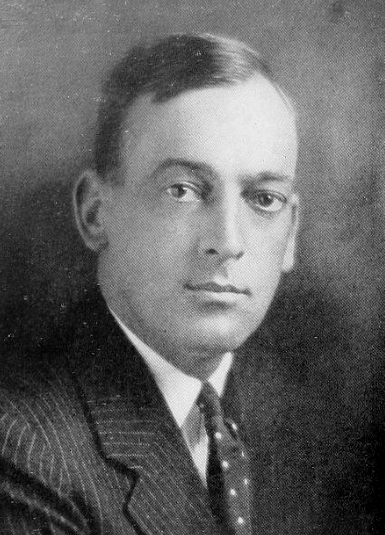
Charles Alexander Waters

Waters' view is named after the American radiologist Charles Alexander Waters. It is also known as the occipitomental view.
