= American Journal of Roentgenology =

- Discipline: Radiology
- Language: English
- Edited by: Andrew B. Rosenkrantz

Publication details
- Former name(s): American Journal of Radiology
- Publisher: American Roentgen Ray Society (United States)

Standard abbreviations
- ISO 4: Am. J. Roentgenol.

Indexing
- ISSN: 1546-3141
- OCLC no.: 225117471

Links
- Journal homepage

The American Journal of Roentgenology (AJR) is a monthly peer-reviewed journal that covers topics in radiology. It is published by the American Roentgen Ray Society (ARRS) and is based in Leesburg, VA. The current editor-in-chief (August 2020) is Andrew B. Rosenkrantz.

== History ==
The publication has undergone several changes throughout its history. The initial publication in 1906 was entitled the American Quarterly of Roentgenology, and was officially associated with the ARRS in 1909. In 1913, journal was renamed the American Journal of Roentgenology, and publication frequency was increased to a monthly basis under editor Preston M. Hickey. Hickey would remain editor-in-chief for approximately 10 years, and became a pioneering voice for evolution of radiologic education and reporting. With the advent of radiation therapy and nuclear medicine under the auspices of radiology, there was a period from 1920 to 1970s during which the ARRS began publishing articles on topics of radiation oncology and nuclear medicine in addition to diagnostic radiology. Accordingly, the journal was renamed American Journal of Roentgenology and Radium Therapy in 1922, and later the American Journal of Roentgenology, Radium Therapy, and Nuclear Medicine. Finally in 1976, the journal was once again renamed back to American Journal of Roentgenology at which time mandatory peer-review was implemented.

In 1975, publication committee chairman Raymond Gagliardi and editor in chief Melvin Figley founded The American Journal of Neuroradiology together with the American Society of Neuroradiology.

== See also ==
- American Roentgen Ray Society
