= American Roentgen Ray Society =

U.S. radiology society

The American Roentgen Ray Society (ARRS) is the first and oldest radiology society in the United States. It was founded in 1900, in the early days of X-ray and radiation study.

Headquartered in Leesburg, Virginia, the society publishes a monthly peer-reviewed journal: American Journal of Roentgenology (previously American Journal of Radiology), providing a forum for advances in radiology and related fields. It provides scholarships, and presents awards.

Its educational programs include seminars and a program of continuing education for radiologic technologists.

Its 9th meeting, in 1908, was held in New York City. There, it announced that there was "no excuse whatever" for anyone being injured during medical X-rays, which "could be taken in a fraction of a second".
