= Funtley =

Village in Hampshire, England

Coordinates: 50.8705°N 1.2026°W

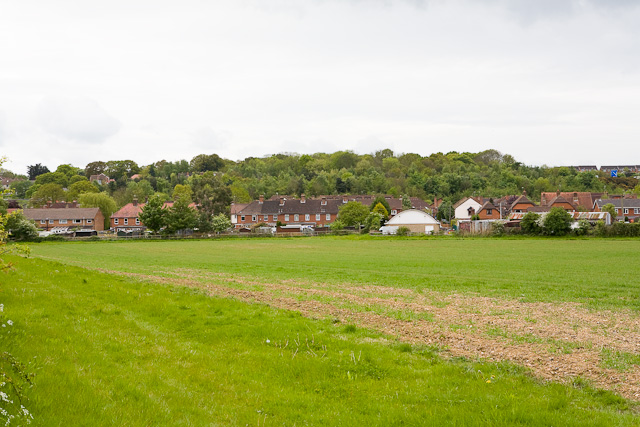

- Location within Hampshire
- Population: 624 (2011 census - two output areas, matching)
- OS grid reference: SU562082
- District: Fareham
- Shire county: Hampshire
- Region: South East
- Country: England
- Sovereign state: United Kingdom
- Post town: Fareham
- Postcode district: PO17
- Dialling code: 01329
- Police: Hampshire and Isle of Wight
- Fire: Hampshire and Isle of Wight
- Ambulance: South Central

Funtley – from the Anglo-Saxon, "Funtaleg", "spring field (clearing)", is a hamlet or exurb north of Fareham, Hampshire, England. It forms a projection towards the South Downs National Park and is generally included within Fareham's population as it is within its built-up area. At present the village is unparished, as the creation of a parish council was rejected by Fareham Borough Council, despite having the support of the majority of residents.

The village grew from the development of a clay quarry, the clay used to make chimney pots and bricks — acclaimed Fareham red (bricks) used to build premium Victorian buildings such as the Royal Albert Hall in London, and Knowle Hospital near Fareham.

Sometimes known as Fontley by locals (reflecting its probable longstanding alternative pronunciation, as it appears in church use and many other place names such as Mottisfont) the village is no longer a discrete settlement owing to post-World War II growth of Fareham, it is an exurb in rural surrounds separated from the town by the M27 motorway. Its brickworks closed in the late 1950s and the chapel closed in 2018. Its former clay quarry is a fishing lake. The village pub, The Miner's Arms, echoes its mid-19th century spell as a near-independent community.

== Amenities ==
=== The Miner's Arms ===
The Miner's Arms is so called because the first landlord, George Feast, was the contractor for the railway tunnel (and also the narrow, humpback bridge). Feast imported a gang of Welsh miners to dig the tunnel, and one of the miners had the privilege of naming it. The pub soon became the hub of the village and was originally both a pub and bottle shop for the miners and, later, the local brick-makers; it was run by at least three or four generations of the Feast family throughout the height of the brickmaking industry. After the decline of the industry, many inhabitants moved to Portsmouth and Gosport for work.

=== Open space ===
Funtley has a park laid to grass with a children's playground, and a meadow managed for conservation by Fareham Borough Council. There is also a fishing lake with a public footpath.

== History ==
=== Fontley Iron Mills ===
Fontley House in Iron Mill Lane was home to Samuel Jellicoe from about 1784 until his death in 1812. He was the partner of Henry Cort of Fontley Iron Mills, adjacent. Cort was the inventor of the rolling mill and the puddling furnace, important for the production of iron during the Napoleonic Wars. Some of Cort's inventions were tried out at these mills.

Cort's innovation was a new process for "fining" iron. This became essential once blast furnaces were used to extract iron from its ore. The "pig" iron produced was too impure for forging (though it could be cast): fining removed the impurities. The previous method of fining used a finery hearth fuelled with charcoal. By Cort's time wood for making charcoal had long become too scarce to enable the iron industry to expand: already many blast furnaces were using coke instead of charcoal. What Cort did was to burn coal in the furnace then "puddle" his impure iron, i.e. stir it with a long rod in the hot gas of the flames. The purified iron came out as spongy mass, and had to be consolidated (shingling). Another of Cort's innovations was to use grooved rolls in a rolling mill rather than a hammer to draw the iron out into a bar. This enabled the iron to be rolled into bars with a variety of cross-sections (square, circular, etc.). These two brilliant innovations were the most important ones for the iron industry in the Industrial Revolution.

The former ruins of this industrial revolution iron mill with smelter's yard showed where the ore was also smelted, local ironstone being used.

Manorial history

The place is the remnant piece of two manors in the hundred of Titchfield, Great Funtley and Little Funtley (or Funtley Parva/Pageham). The manors first appear in the Domesday Book. The wider hundred was mostly Titchfield parish. It was locally a mixture of forest and relatively short farming leases that belonged to the crown. Accordingly, in 1279 John of Brittany withdrew his suit (of court) (claim to outright or continued ownership) in respect of his manors of Crofton, Lee Markes, and Funtley, and as he did not appear the sheriff was ordered to distrain (in favour of the King) upon his land. It was among a handful of manors in Titchfield's parish, the church of which dates to 680 AD, and contributed to the early founding of Titchfield Abbey. The other manor vested in the Arundel family from 1241 to 1615, but who long-let it, successively to the de Hoyvilles, Uvedales, others, Sir Richard Corbett and then Rashleighs whose 19th century holders had it much divided (sold off in pieces). Some of the area of the former manors has contributed to modern-day Knowle, a hill-top, compact village.

Railway tunnel

Henry Feast began selling beer in Funtley in 1839. He was in court, held in the "Red Lion", Fareham, charged with keeping a disorderly beer house on 18 December 1839; he was convicted and paid a fine and costs totalling 40 shillings. Feast bought the property that became "The Miners' Arms" from Robert James, a merchant of Fareham, with a £100 mortgage on 5 March 1840. The first time the name "The Miners' Arms" appears is on the 1841 Census return, where Feast is described as a labourer, probably working on the construction of the railway during the day, leaving the beer house and shop to be run by his wife and children. The Register of Licensees for beer shops and public houses starts in 1872 (previous records do not survive), and shows Feast as the owner and licensee in 1872 and 1873. Feast died 28 September 1874 aged 76; the previous year he conveyed everything to his eldest son George, who is recorded as the owner and licensee from 28 September 1874. George retained the property until 29 February 1892 when he sold it to Henry William Saunders. James Feast, son of George, became the licensee after the sale, and remained such until December 1913, when George Robert James Oakes succeeded him.

After Saunders died, his wife Annie Elizabeth is described as the owner and mortgagee on the licence until 8 February 1905, when it shows his two sons Herbert Henry and Richard John Saunders as owners; presumably the mortgage had been settled. In 1921, the wall separating the bar and refreshment room was taken down to give the licensee supervision over both. Herbert Henry and Richard John, whose Wallington Brewery, had to sell everything on 31 March 1944. The reason is stated in "Fareham Past and Present". The buyer, Charles Hamilton and Co. Ltd, held the pub for 26 years until its sale to Bass Charrington on 1 July 1970. It came into the possession of George Gale and Co. Ltd in July 1991 and passed by the 2010s to Fullers Brewery.

== Church or chapel ==
The closed Anglican Little Church of St Francis or Chapel was a mission church of St Peter & St Paul, Fareham, in the Diocese of Portsmouth. The church closed in 2018. Listed as a small, stuccoed, T-shaped church with traceried windows, hoods and bargeboards, it was probably designed by the Irish architect Jacob Owen (1778- 1870). Simplicity is its dominant feature, built as a community school in 1836, becoming Trinity Fontley Church. The painted window above the altar, depicting the Nativity and the Ascension of Christ, is reputed to have been made or designed by John Ruskin; it was originally in the Church of Duntisbourne Abbots, near Cirencester.

== Funtley Deviation ==
The Funtley Deviation was a railway built to the west of the village avoiding Fareham tunnel. With the later abandonment of the deviation and full reversion to the tunnel route, the present railway route passes through the middle of the village, but there is no railway station serving it.
