= Fareham (disambiguation) =

Fareham is a town in Hampshire, England.

Fareham may also refer to:

- Borough of Fareham, a district of Hampshire, England
- Fareham, U.S. Virgin Islands
- Fareham (UK Parliament constituency), Hampshire, England
- Fareham railway station, a station serving the town
- Fareham Town F.C., a football club in the town
- HMS Fareham (J89), a ship
- Fareham red brick
- Fareham College
- Fort Fareham
- Fareham bus station
