= Leucotome =

Surgical instrument

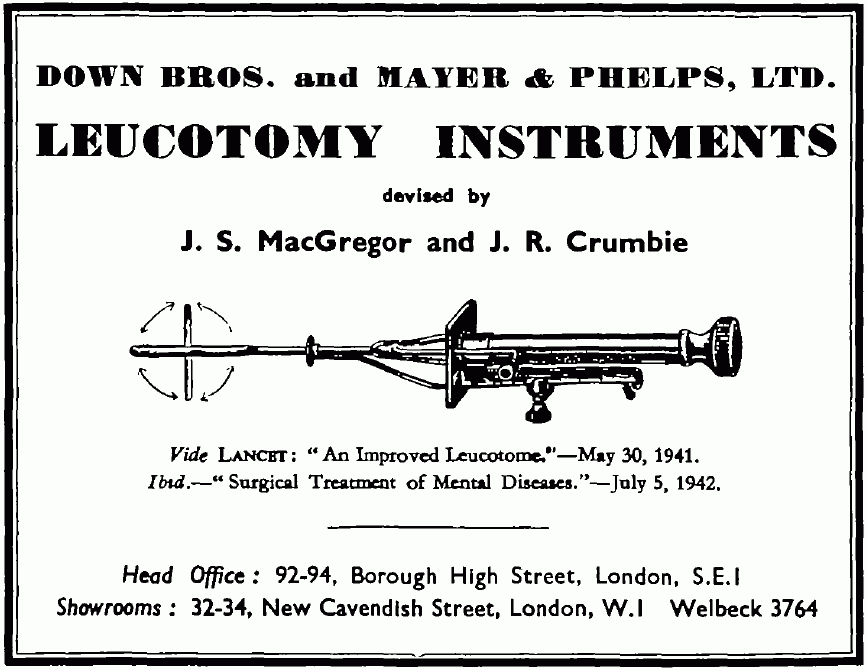
Advertisement for a Leucotome in the 1940s

A leucotome or McKenzie leucotome is a surgical instrument used for performing leucotomies (also known as lobotomy) and other forms of psychosurgery.

The leucotome was invented by the Nobel Prize-winning Portuguese neurologist Egas Moniz. His early design was an altered cannula, and later models would be reportedly based on an apple-corer. Alongside Almeida Lima, Moniz would develop these designs into a leucotome with a retractable wire loop.

A more refined leucotome would be invented by Canadian neurosurgeon Dr. Kenneth G. McKenzie in the 1940s, the leucotome has a narrow shaft which is inserted into the brain through a hole in the skull, and then a plunger on the back of the leucotome is depressed to extend a wire loop or metal strip into the brain. The leucotome is then rotated, cutting a core of brain tissue.

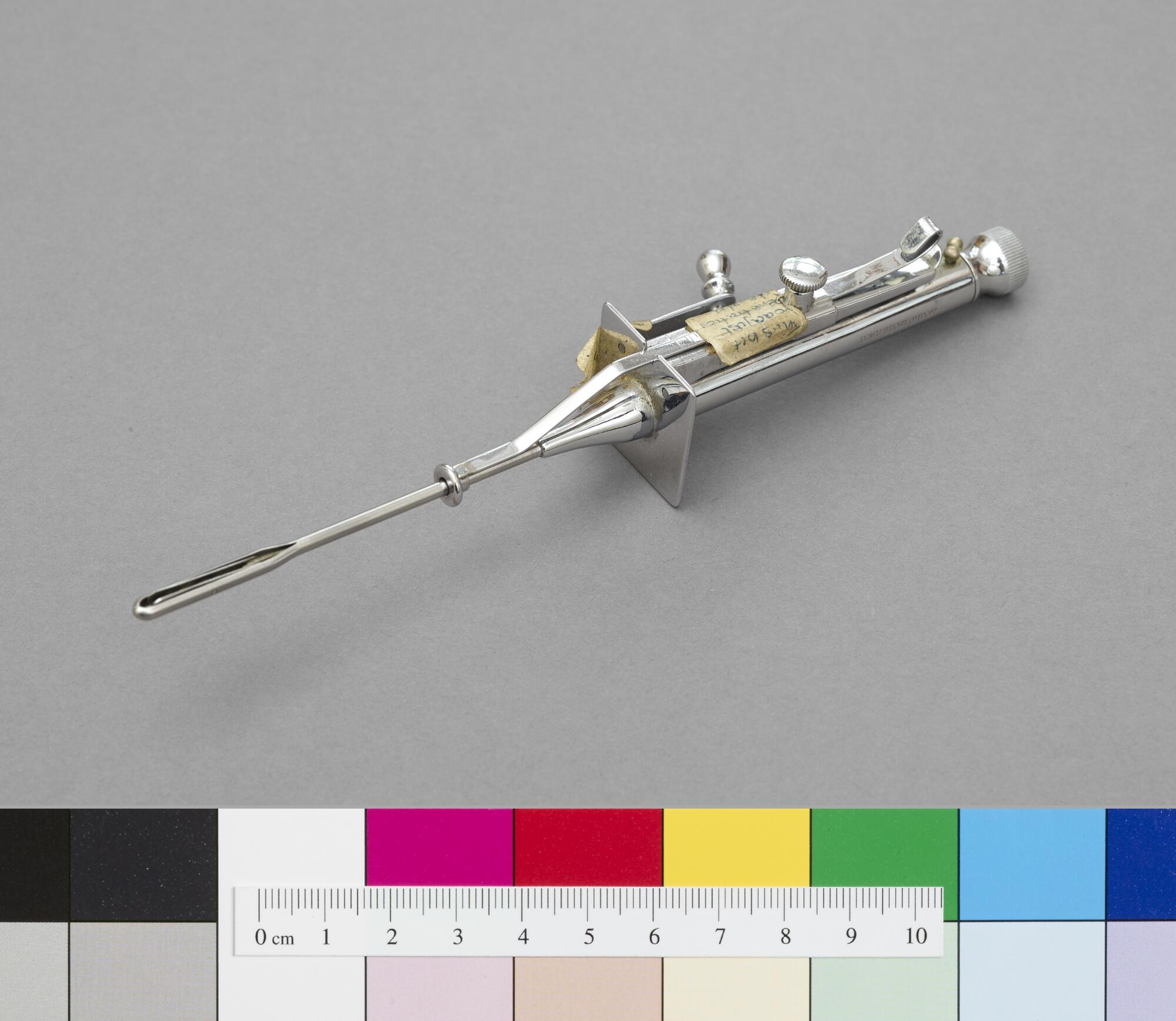
A leucotome designed by Neurosurgeon John Crumbie, Croydon Mental Hospital, 1955

Another, different, surgical instrument also called a leucotome was introduced by Walter Freeman for use in the transorbital lobotomy. Modeled after an ice-pick, it consisted simply of a pointed shaft. It was passed through the tear duct under the eyelid and against the top of the eyesocket. A mallet was used to drive the instrument through the thin layer of bone and into the brain along the plane of the bridge of the nose, to a depth of 5 cm. Due to incidents of breakage, a stronger but essentially identical instrument called an orbitoclast was later used.

Lobotomies were commonly performed from the 1930s to the 1960s, with a few as late as the 1980s in France.

== See also ==
- Orbitoclast
- Lobotomy
- Instruments used in general surgery
