= Blumine =

Blumine is a German word meaning simply "Goddess of Flowers", with no specific mythological source. It may also mean:

- Blumine Island, New Zealand
- A character from Sartor Resartus by Thomas Carlyle
- A rejected movement from Mahler's First Symphony
- An 1884 polka by Edward Elgar; see Powick Asylum Music
- A variation of the color blue
