= Bishops Waltham railway station =

Demolished railway station in England

Bishops Waltham
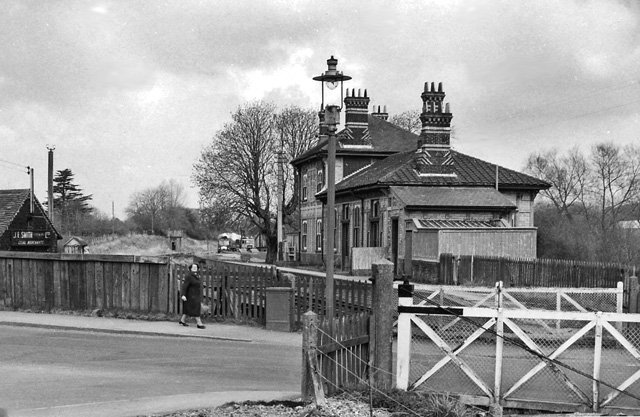
- April 1963

General information
- Location: Bishop's Waltham, Winchester; England
- Coordinates: 50.9544°N 1.2180°W
- Grid reference: SU550175
- Platforms: One

Other information
- Status: Disused

History
- Original company: Bishops Waltham Railway
- Pre-grouping: London and South Western Railway
- Post-grouping: Southern Railway; Southern Region of British Railways

Key dates
- 1 June 1863: Opened
- 2 January 1933: Closed to passengers
- 27 April 1962: Closed to freight
Location

Bishops Waltham railway station was a railway station in Bishop's Waltham, Hampshire, England. The station was the terminus of the 3.75 mile branch line that connected to the main line at Botley railway station. It opened on 1 June 1863, and closed to passengers on 2 January 1933. After closure to freight in 1962 it was demolished in 1965 and the site is now a roundabout.

== See also ==
- List of closed railway stations in Britain
- Bishops Waltham branch

Preceding station	Disused railways	Following station
Durley Halt	British Railways; Southern Region; London and South Western Railway	Terminus
