= Knowle Halt railway station =

Former railway station in England

Knowle Halt Railway Station
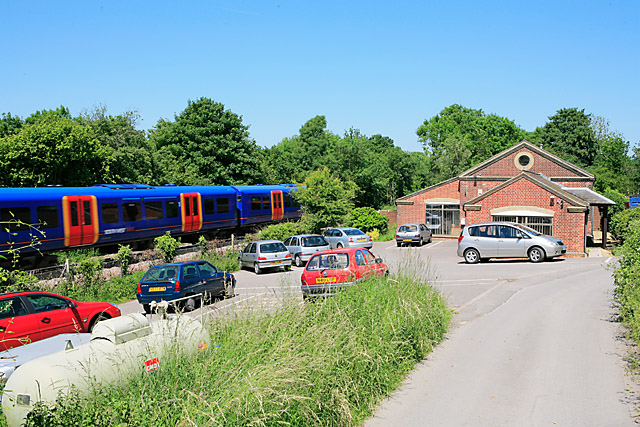
- Site of former Knowle Halt

General information
- Location: Knowle, Winchester City Council; England
- Coordinates: 50.882°N 1.208°W
- Grid reference: SU558095
- Platforms: One

Other information
- Status: Disused

History
- Pre-grouping: London & South Western Railway (1907-1923)
- Post-grouping: Southern Railway (1923 to 1948); Southern Region of British Railways (from 1948)

Key dates
- 1 May 1907: Opened
- 6 April 1964: Closed
Location

Knowle Halt was a railway station in the county of Hampshire in England. It was served by trains on the Eastleigh to Fareham and Meon Valley lines. The station opened in 1907 and closed in 1964.

== History ==
=== Opening ===
The station was opened on 1 May 1907 by the London and South Western Railway (LSWR) to serve Knowle Hospital, then known as the Hampshire County Lunatic Asylum. Opened as Knowle Asylum Halt, its name was changed to Knowle Platform and then, from 1942, to Knowle Halt.

=== Facilities ===
From the beginning, this simple halt was fitted with electric lights, powered from the nearby hospital's generators. This made it one of the first rural stations in Hampshire to have electric lighting.

=== Closure ===
The station was originally closed on 12 August 1963, but was re-opened the following day due to objections from trade unions. The halt finally closed on 6 April 1964.

== The site today and future plans ==
The concrete supports of the former platform still exist alongside the now single track of the Eastleigh to Fareham Line. Due to the provision of much new housing on and around the former hospital site, on the outskirts of Fareham, it has been suggested that the station should be considered for reopening. In February 2017 it was reported that Network Rail had recently met with Fareham Borough Council to discuss various options for connecting the new Welborne development to the existing railway network, and had offered to work with the council to look at providing a new station at the site.

== Route ==
Preceding station	Disused railways	Following station
Botley; Line and station open	British Rail; Southern Region; Eastleigh to Fareham line	Fareham; Line and station open

== See also ==
- List of closed railway stations in Britain
