= Powick Hospital =

- (previously Worcester County Pauper and Lunatic Asylum)
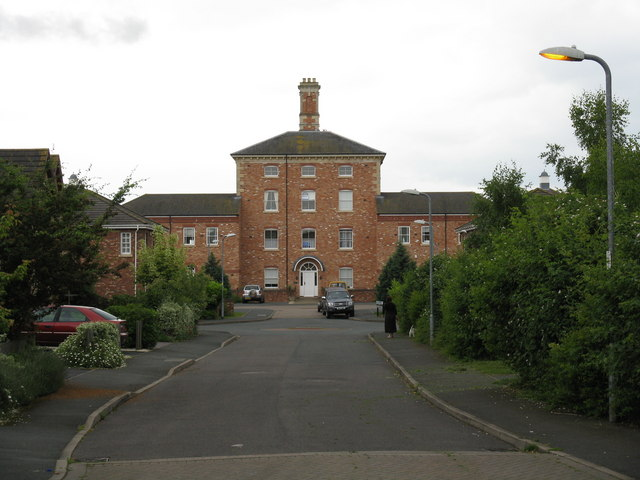
- Hospital Lane - the former hospital

- Shown in Worcestershire

Geography
- Location: Powick, Worcestershire, England, United Kingdom
- Coordinates: 52°09′14.5″N 2°15′50.3″W

Organisation
- Care system: Public NHS
- Type: Psychiatric

Services
- Beds: 1,000 (approx.)

History
- Founded: 1847
- Closed: 1989

Links
- Lists: Hospitals in England

Powick Hospital was a psychiatric facility located on 552 acres (223 ha) outside the village of Powick, near Malvern, Worcestershire. It opened in 1847 and at its peak, it housed around 1,000 patients in buildings designed for 400. During the 1950s the hospital gained an internationally acclaimed reputation for its use of the drug LSD in psychotherapy pioneered and conducted by Ronald A. Sandison. In 1968 the institution was surrounded by controversy concerning serious neglect of patients. In 1989 it was closed down leaving Barnsley Hall Hospital in Bromsgrove as the remaining psychiatric hospital in the county. Most of the complex has been demolished to make way for a housing estate.

== History ==
=== Origins ===
Founded in 1847 as the Worcester County Pauper and Lunatic Asylum, it was designed by architects J. R. Hamilton and J. M. Medland of Gloucester and opened in August 1852. Situated between Worcester and Malvern on former farmland known as White Chimneys, the asylum was originally erected for the accommodation of 200 inmates but was later extended and by 1858 had 365 patients.

=== Edward Elgar ===
The doctors at the Asylum in the 1870s showed a remarkably enlightened attitude when they instituted a series of orchestral concerts there, as well as the Friday night dances for the inmates. Elgar, as a young violinist in the district played in the concerts from 1877, and in January 1879 succeeded Fred S. May in the post of Band Instructor. In 1879, at the age of 22, Elgar composed a number of works, the Powick Asylum Music, for the attendants' band. His job consisted of conducting the Asylum Band, made up of the staff of the Asylum, and composing music for the Friday dances. The authorities paid him £4 per annum less than his predecessor, no doubt because of his inexperience, but he received about £30 per year, plus 5 shillings for every polka and quadrille and one shilling and sixpence for accompaniments to the Christy's Minstrels ditties of the day. The last set of dances he composed in 1884.

=== Research ===
By the 1950s it had around 1,000 patients and major research and experimentation in the treatment of chronic depression and schizophrenia was being carried out. In 1952 during a trip to Switzerland and visiting Sandoz, the consultant psychiatrist at Powick, Ronald Sandison, came in contact with Albert Hofmann, who had discovered the hallucinogenic drug LSD by accident. He returned to the UK with 100 vials of LSD, called 'Delysid' at that time by Sandoz. Sandison started by using LSD on his patients in Powick whose psychoanalysis was not advancing their therapy and he recorded significant success even in the most severe cases. He developed a programme he called "Psycholytic Therapy" (literally "mind loosening therapy") for treatment of illnesses such as severe depression and schizophrenia.

A government funded purpose-built LSD treatment unit, the first of its kind in the world, was established at the hospital in 1958 in which Dr. Sandison administered his therapy until he left the institution in 1964. Medical Superintendent Dr. Arthur Spencer continued the programme until Sandoz abruptly withdrew supplies of the drug in 1965, due to the problems of illicit recreational use. Records indicate that 683 patients had been treated with LSD in 13,785 separate sessions before the programme was discontinued. In 2002 the NHS agreed to pay £195,000, in an out of court settlement, to 43 former psychiatric patients who were treated with LSD between 1950 and 1970.

Sandison writes about his early years at Powick:

...the amenities were bleak in the extreme compared with Warlingham. The hospital had been built in 1852 for 200 patients... Arthur (Spencer) and I were the only consultants, and two assistant doctors completed the staff. There were nearly 1,000 patients, 400 of whom were living in the four large wards of the 'annexe' built in the 1890s. I discovered that the heating system was defunct, many of the internal telephones did not work, and the hospital was deeply impoverished in every department. This state of affairs had been allowed to develop by the previous medical superintendent, Dr Fenton... who had spent 43 years at Powick. He practised the utmost economy and Powick became the cheapest hospital in the country... After discussion and consultation with my colleagues at Powick, and with the professor of Psychiatry in Birmingham, I undertook the clinical use of LSD at Powick Hospital towards the end of 1952.

=== Decline and closure ===
In 1968 Powick Hospital featured in a controversial edition of the leading British investigative television programme World in Action, showing elderly patients in Ward F13 being left soaking in their own urine. The programme also featured other notorious examples of how the institution 'cared' for its patients in overcrowded conditions without dignity or privacy. This footage was subsequently re-used in a current affairs strand in 1993 - 1994. The footage of Ward F13's patients was superimposed on a picture of an asylum wall while a reporter disguised as a homeless schizophrenic looks back at how psychiatric patients were treated.

The asylum wall at Powick itself was knocked down in the 1950s as part of Dr. Arthur Spencer's initiatives in updating and modernising the hospital. In the World in Action programme, Dr Spencer speaks of having to take the decision, as Medical Superintendent, to spend the limited funds available on acute rather than chronic care. The shocking revelations of the Ward F13 programme contributed to Powick being amongst the first wave of mental hospitals selected for closure in favour of community care developments. Acute admissions ceased in 1978 and the last patients were discharged in 1989. The hospital closed in 1989 and was subsequently demolished, with the site being redeveloped for housing and offices.

== See also ==
- Healthcare in Worcestershire
- List of hospitals in England
