= Durley Halt railway station =

Former railway station in England

Durley Halt
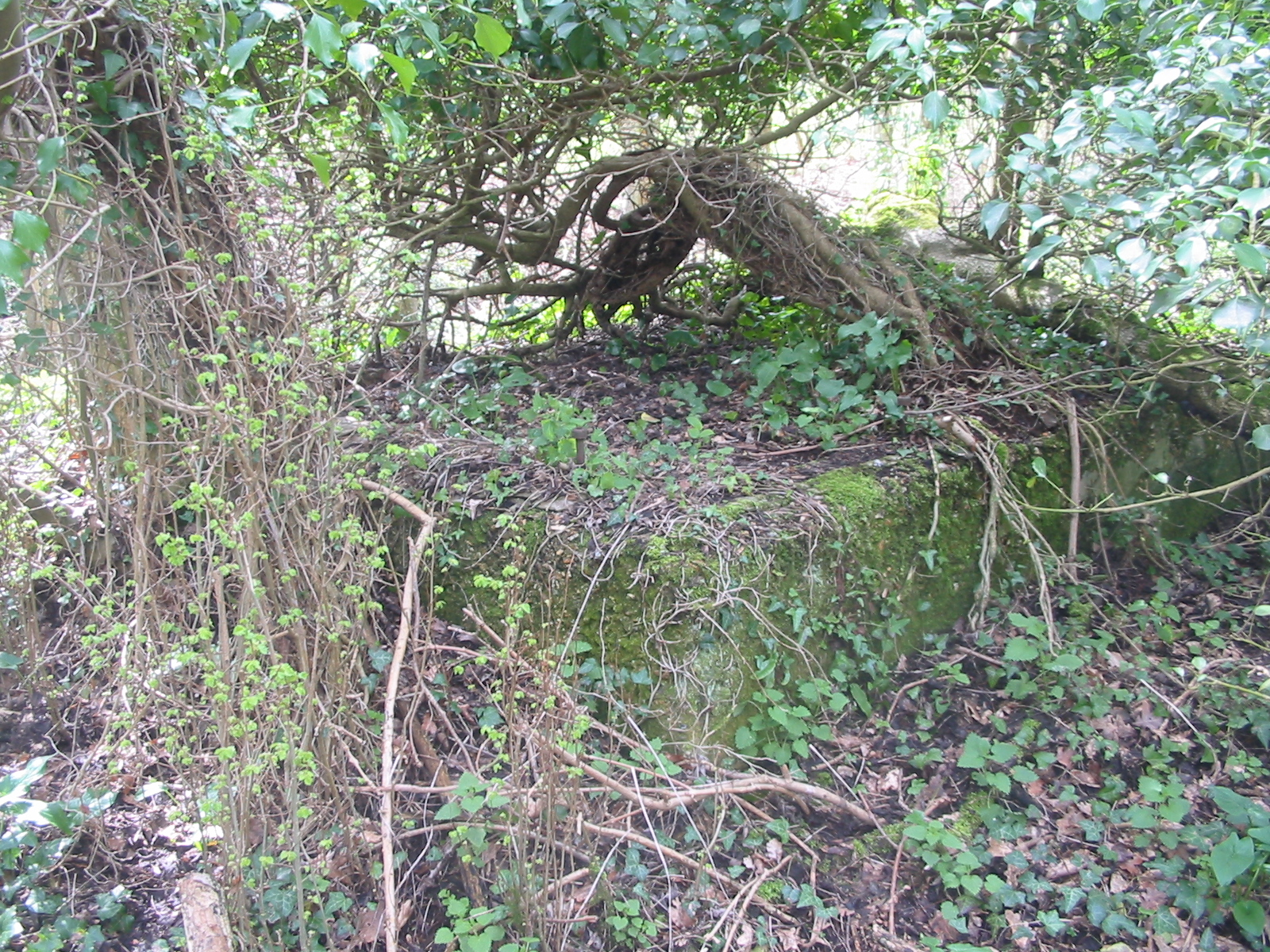
- The remains of Durley Halt Platform, April 2004

General information
- Location: Durley Mill, City of Winchester; England
- Coordinates: 50.93278°N 1.25306°W
- Grid reference: SU525150
- Platforms: One

Other information
- Status: Disused

History
- Original company: London and South Western Railway
- Pre-grouping: London and South Western Railway
- Post-grouping: Southern Railway

Key dates
- 23 December 1909: Opened
- 2 January 1933: Closed to passengers
Location

Durley Halt railway station was the only intermediate stop on the 3 3/4 mile Bishops Waltham branch line that connected Bishops Waltham to Botley. Opened in 1909 it was only ever lightly used but remained open to passengers until the last train called on 31 December 1932; Freight trains continued along the line past the station until 1962.

== See also ==
- List of closed railway stations in Britain

== Route ==
Preceding station	Disused railways	Following station
Bishops Waltham	British Railways; Southern Region; London and South Western Railway	Botley
