= Durley Mill =

Hamlet in Hampshire, England

Coordinates: 50°56′03″N 1°15′25″W

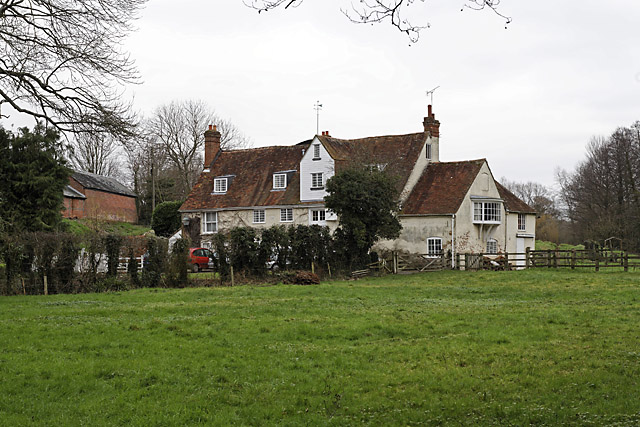
- Durley Mill from footpath

- Location within Hampshire
- Civil parish: Durley
- District: Winchester
- Shire county: Hampshire
- Region: South East
- Country: England
- Sovereign state: United Kingdom
- Police: Hampshire and Isle of Wight
- Fire: Hampshire and Isle of Wight
- Ambulance: South Central

Durley Mill is a hamlet between Botley and Bishops Waltham, in the civil parish of Durley, in the Winchester district, in the county of Hampshire, England. It once had a small intermediate halt on the Bishops Waltham branch.
