= Ronald A. Sandison =

British psychiatrist (1916–2010)

Ronald Sandison
- Born: Ronald Arthur Sandison; 1 April 1916; Shetland, Scotland
- Died: 18 June 2010 (aged 94); Ledbury, Herefordshire, England
- Education: King's College Hospital
- Scientific career
- Fields: Psychotherapy, psychiatry
- Workplaces: RAF Institute of Aviation Medicine, Powick Hospital, Warlingham Park Hospital, Knowle Hospital, Margaret Pyke Centre

Ronald Arthur Sandison (1 April 1916 – 18 June 2010) was a British psychiatrist and psychotherapist. Among his other work, he is particularly noted for his pioneering studies and use of lysergic acid diethylamide (LSD) as a psychotheraputic drug. As a consultant psychiatrist, his LSD work was mainly carried out during the 1950s and '60s at Powick Hospital, a large psychiatric facility near Malvern, Worcestershire, after which he spent several years in Southampton, where he was instrumental in the establishment of the university medical school. He returned to his native Shetland Isles in the 1970s and worked in psychotherapy there. He later specialised in psychosexual medicine on the UK mainland. Sandison died at the age of 94, and was buried in Ledbury near Malvern.

== Education and early work ==
Sandison was born in Shetland, a group of islands 170 km (110 mi) northeast of the Scottish mainland. When he was still a baby his father moved from Shetland to London where as a civil servant he was in charge of ancient monuments. Sandison attended the independent school of King's College School in Wimbledon, a feeder school for King's College London, a public research university. He began pre-clinical studies in 1934 and was awarded a scholarship to study medicine at King's College Hospital in London, qualifying with a MBBS in 1940.

In 1941 he began his service with the Royal Air Force (RAF), stationed in Farnborough, Hampshire at the physiological laboratory, researching the medical effects of flight on aircrew, including high altitude oxygen deficiency and night flying on Spitfire pilots. On his demob, he left military service as the head of the Physiological Development Panel at Central Fighter Establishment in 1946, with the senior officer rank of wing commander (corresponding to the army rank of lieutenant colonel). He continued by training as a psychiatrist at Warlingham Park Hospital, a psychiatric facility in Surrey, where he successfully completed a diploma in Psychological Medicine in 1948. While studying the dreams of insulin coma therapy patients, he became interested in the work of Swiss psychologist Carl Jung.

== Work with LSD ==
In 1951, at age 35, Sandison joined the staff at the Powick psychiatric hospital, a large former Victorian style 'lunatic asylum' near Malvern, as a consultant, and set about improving the run-down facility. He described the place as 'medieval', overcrowded and run-down, the 1,000 patients were subjected to electric shock and insulin-coma therapies, and lobotomies. In 1952 during a visit to Switzerland, he came in contact with Albert Hofmann at Sandoz, who had discovered the effects of hallucinogenic drug LSD by accident. He returned to the UK with 100 vials of LSD, called 'Delysid' at that time by Sandoz. Sandison started by using LSD on his patients in Powick whose psychoanalysis was not advancing their therapy and he recorded significant success even in the most severe cases.

In 1955 Powick Hospital inaugurated its government-funded centre, which would be the world's first purpose-built LSD unit. The system used there by Sandison, a programme he called "Psycholytic Therapy" (literally "mind loosening therapy") for treatment of illnesses such as severe depression and schizophrenia, became the established method for LSD treatment worldwide. In 1955 Sandison addressed the American Psychiatric Association about his work and in 1961, he chaired an LSD therapy meeting at the Royal Medico-Psychological Association, now the Royal College of Psychiatrists. Sandison writes about his early years at Powick:

...the amenities were bleak in the extreme compared with Warlingham. The hospital had been built in 1852 for 200 patients... Arthur (Spencer) and I were the only consultants, and two assistant doctors completed the staff. There were nearly 1,000 patients, 400 of whom were living in the four large wards of the 'annexe' built in the 1890s. I discovered that the heating system was defunct, many of the internal telephones did not work, and the hospital was deeply impoverished in every department. This state of affairs had been allowed to develop by the previous medical superintendent, Dr Fenton... who had spent 43 years at Powick. He practised the utmost economy and Powick became the cheapest hospital in the country... After discussion and consultation with my colleagues at Powick, and with the professor of Psychiatry in Birmingham, I undertook the clinical use of LSD at Powick Hospital towards the end of 1952.

Sandson and his team vastly improved the hospital, helping it to gain an international reputation for its treatments. While in Powick he created a local branch of the Samaritans in the nearby city of Worcester.

Controversy was beginning to develop about the use of LSD in a medical situation, and in 1964, after becoming disenchanted by the increasing use of LSD as a recreational drug, Sandison left Powick. Medical Superintendent Dr. Arthur Spencer continued the programme until Sandoz suddenly stopped supplying the drug in 1966. Records indicate that 683 patients had been treated with LSD in 13,785 separate sessions before the programme was discontinued. In an interview with Sandison, author and investigative journalist Dominic Streatfeild in research for his 2006 book Brainwash: The Secret History of Mind Control, reveals: "Dr Sandison was a huge help to me when I was researching ‘Brainwash’ and we spoke many times. I thought he was a wonderful, wonderful man." In 1970 the Home Office reported that there was no evidence for limiting the use of LSD for medicinal purposes. In 2002 however, in an out of court settlement the NHS accorded a total of £195,000 to 43 former patients who had received LSD treatment between1950 and 1970.

== Later work ==
Sandison moved on to work at Knowle Hospital, a former psychiatric facility near Southampton which closed in 1996. Intent on maintaining medical psychotherapy as part of the National Health Service (NHS), Sandison stimulated hospital doctors undergoing training as specialists to take a diploma in psychotherapy, and encouraging students to enroll at the new University of Southampton School of Medicine which he helped to create. Returning to the Shetland Isles where he was born, arguing that it would be more practical and economical than flying patients to the Scottish mainland he rebuilt the community's ailing psychiatric services from 1975 to 1982. He later spent the rest of his working life on psychosexual medicine and family planning at the Margaret Pyke centre in London. Despite having given up his work on LSD, Sandison 'believed passionately in its benefits'. He stayed completely certain about its medicinal use to the end of his life, retiring in 1992.

== Personal life ==
Sandison liked walking and sailing. He was married three times. His first wife was Evelyn Oppen, and they had two sons. His 1965 marriage to Margaret Godfrey ended in divorce, and in 1982, he married Beth Almon. He moved with her to Ledbury, near Malvern in 1992, where he spent his retirement.

== Publications (selection) ==
- A Century of Psychiatry, Psychotherapy and Group Analysis (2001) (semi autobiographical). Foreword by Malcom Pines. Jessica Kingsley Publishers Ltd., London. 185302869X.
- Psychological aspects of the LSD treatment of the neuroses (1954) Journal of Mental Science. PMID 13175012 DOI: 10.1192/bjp.100.419.508
- Ronald Sandison. (1953). 'Psychological Disturbance and Artistic Creation'. The Journal of Nervous and Mental Disease. Vol. 117, No. 4. p. 320.
- Sandison, R. A., et al. (1954). 'The therapeutic value of lysergic acid diethylamide in mental illness'. Journal of Mental Science. 100: 491–507. (Summary)
- Sandison, R. A. & Whitelaw, J. D. A. (1957). 'Further studies of the therapeutic value of lysergic acid diethylamide in mental illness'. Journal of Mental Science. 103: 332–343. (Summary)
- Ronald Sandison (1991). LSD: Its Rise, Fall and Enduring Value. A New Perspective. Albert Hofmann Foundation Bulletin. Vol. 2. No. 1. p. 8.
- Ronald Sandison (1997). 'LSD Therapy: A Retrospective', in Psychedelia Britannica: Hallucinogenic Drugs in Britain, edited by Antonio Melechi. Turnaround, London.
- Ronald Sandison (1998) 'Memory and Psychotherapy: Individual and Group', Group Analysis, 27(4): 395–406. Vol 31, Issue 1, 1998, DOI: 10.1177/0533316498311007
- Ronald Sandison In-Tide-Out: The Autobiography of a Psychiatrist and Analytical Psychotherapist. (Unpublished undated autobiography from 2000s)

== See also ==
- History of lysergic acid diethylamide

== Notes ==
Papers from 1940 to 2000 relating to Sanderson's career including personal memories and a typescript autobiographical draft are held in the Welcome Collection listed by the National archives.

Content sourced or cited from The Psychiatrist article is Copyright © Royal College of Psychiatrists, 2010, released under Creative Commons Attribution (CC-BY) license
