= Eastleigh–Fareham line =

Railway line in Hampshire, England

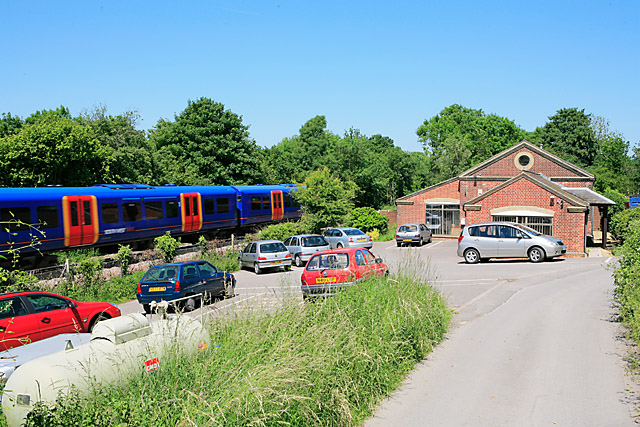
- A passenger train passes Knowle in Hampshire

Overview
- Status: Operational
- Owner: Network Rail
- Locale: Hampshire; South East England

Service
- Type: Suburban rail, heavy rail
- System: National Rail
- Operator: South Western Railway

History
- Opened: 1841

Technical
- Track gauge: 1,435 mm (4 ft 8 1/2 in) standard gauge
Route map
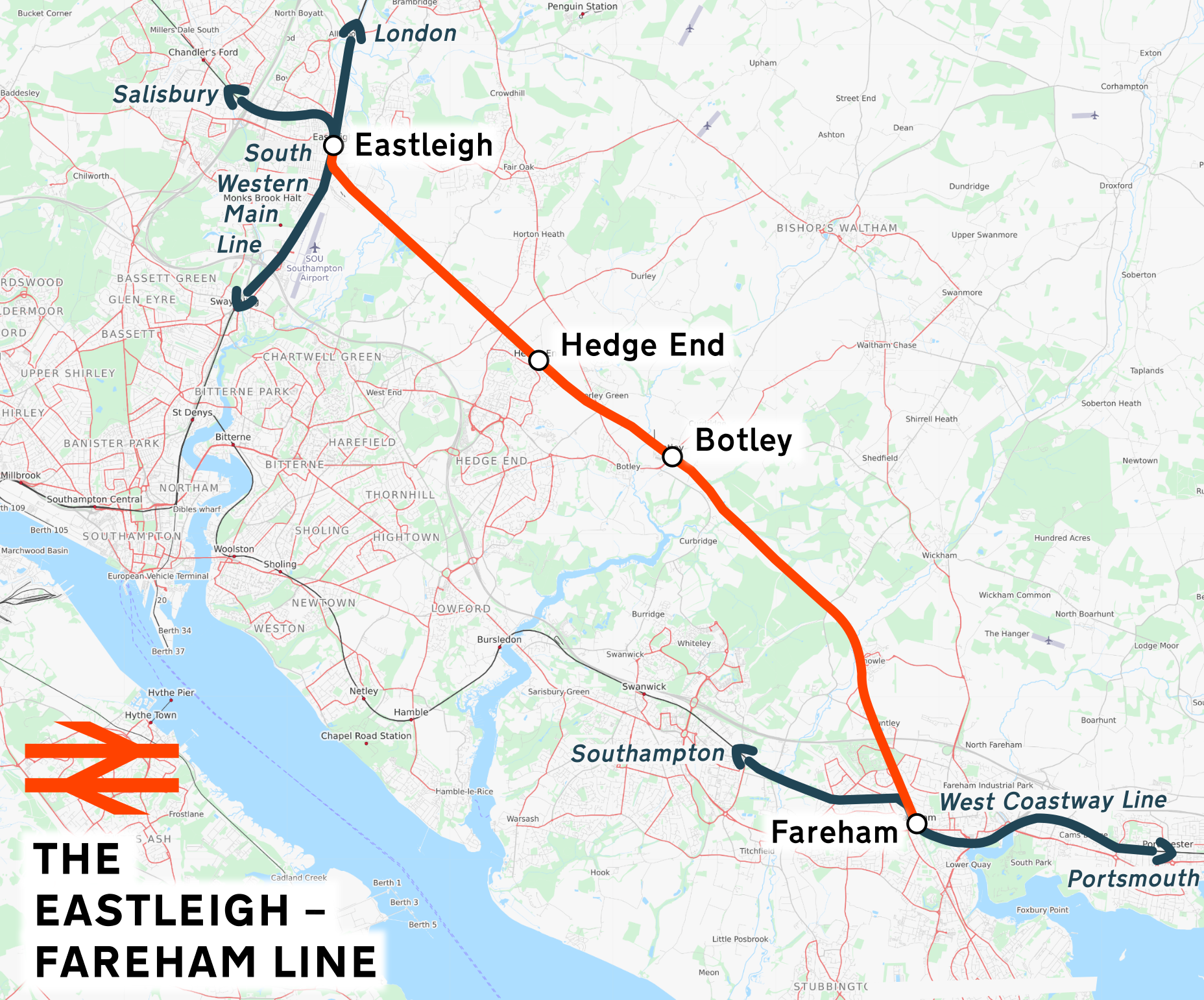
(Click to expand)

The Eastleigh–Fareham line is the railway line from Eastleigh to Fareham in England. At Eastleigh, trains join the South West Main Line for onward travel to Basingstoke and London Waterloo. At Fareham trains join the West Coastway Line for onward travel to Portsmouth.

Services and stations on this line are operated by South Western Railway. It has an approximately hourly service in each direction. It is a useful diversionary route, used when the Portsmouth Direct Line is closed or when the lines around Southampton are closed.

The line was electrified with 750 V DC third rail; electric services commencing May 1990.

== History ==
=== Opening ===
Construction of the branch line from Bishopstoke (now Eastleigh) station to Gosport, terminating "outside the fortifications", was approved in 1839. In Portsmouth, there were strong objections to the city being served by a company with rival city Southampton featuring prominently in its name, and so the same act of parliament renamed the company from the London and Southampton Railway to the London and South Western Railway (LSWR).

Constructed by Thomas Brassey's company, the line was opened on 29 November 1841 but closed four days later due to concerns about the stability of the tunnel at Fareham. In particular the chief inspecting officer, Sir Frederick Smith, remarked that the line at this point passed "through a soil which has baffled all calculation", with the banks of the cutting so steep that "there is scarcely any slope at which it would stand". The line reopened on 7 February 1842.

=== Engineering works ===
The area north of Fareham lies in the Reading clay beds which once supporting a brick, tile and chimney pot-making industry. When constructing the railway tunnel north of Fareham Station the LSWR's contractor encountered numerous problems with flooding and subsidence, and only with much use of bulkhead walls and props could the tunnel be driven through Funtley Hill. In fact, on 15 July 1841 100 feet of the tunnel collapsed while still under construction. Efforts to rebuild the tunnel arch were abandoned after a further land slip on 25 August 1841 and, after the debris was dug out, a short cutting was left resulting in two separate tunnels. Going against the advice of the inspecting Royal Engineer, once the line opened on 29 November 1841, passenger traffic lasted just 4 days before the LSWR's engineer, Joseph Locke, closed the line following a land slip which covered both tracks between the tunnels, during a period of extended heavy rainfall. Goods traffic was reinstated once it was safe to remove the debris but passenger traffic was not permitted until 7 February 1842. The problems with stability continued and the tunnel was relined in the 1870s resulting in special working instructions which required the external lamps then attached to the sides of carriages to be removed for fear of hitting either the tunnels' sides or trains passing in the other direction. When the Meon Valley Railway Act was passed in 1897, it included the 2-mile-long (3.2 km) double-track Funtley Deviation line to be built half a mile to the west of the tunnel to bypass the problem. The tunnel line was retained, initially for Meon Valley traffic only, and singled in 1906 which at least solved the problems associated with reduced clearances (see Meon Valley Railway). On 6 May 1973 the deviation line was closed after it too had suffered from landslips, a serious one in 1962 putting one line out of use, and the new M27 motorway then permanently obstructed the route, save for a pedestrian subway.

The original line remains single between Fareham and Botley and in recent times the line has had to be closed and rebuilt, again due to the clay upon which it was originally laid. In 2019 the cutting south of Fareham no. 2 tunnel (the southerly one) had to be stabilised with several tonnes of bagged ballast and that the northern wing walls of Fareham no. 1 tunnel (the northerly one, further extended by the construction of the M27 between 1973 and 1975) have developed large cracks due to the very mobile soil conditions. It is to be expected that significant remedial work will be required in the 2020s.

==== 2020 track replacement ====
The line was closed to upgrade just under a mile of track and carry out maintenance on points and other parts of the line in May 2020, with the new track being laid by a track renewal train.

==== 2022 Fareham Tunnel cutting repairs ====
In 2014 the line experienced a further landslip near Botley which resulted in services being suspended for over a month. This was followed by further temporary repairs in the aftermath of Storm Frank in 2016. Following these incidents, Network Rail temporarily closed the line in June 2022 to implement "a permanent fix to keep trains running safely". The closure was set to last for 9 days and as well as the main task of repairing the cutting near Fareham Tunnel and reducing its gradient, the company sought to carry out 42 other jobs on the line at the same time including winter-proofing the points, clearing litter and graffiti and replacing freight sidings. The project cost £2.28 million and involved 20 construction vehicles, 10 trains and hundreds of engineers working a combined 7,500 hours, in which 5,000 tonnes of earth were removed from the cutting and an 80-metre long retaining wall was built.

==== 2024 slope stabilisation ====
The line was closed again for five days in early 2024 for works near Fareham Tunnel to prevent a landslip. Heavy rainfall caused land movement which was observed by Network Rail engineers, leading to the work that involved drilling 260 steel nails, each one 25 metres (82 ft) long, into the sides of the cutting to prevent the soil slipping onto the railway. Network Rail confirmed this was a different part of the cutting from where the 2022 works had taken place, and no problems with land movement were detected around those earlier works.

== Development plans ==
=== Allington station ===
The Borough of Eastleigh's 2019 local plan discussed the possibility of a new station on the line at Allington, which would need to have "two platforms of sufficient length to accommodate up to 12-car trains" and would cost around £8-9 million. A joint statement from the borough council and Network Rail indicated that it was unlikely the station would be built.

== Stations ==
The line has retained all the stations that it had when it opened, apart from Bishop's Waltham, a station reached by the Bishops Waltham branch line from Botley, and Knowle Halt. In addition, a new station, Hedge End, was opened in 1990.
