= Knowle, Hampshire =

Village in Hampshire, England

Coordinates: 50.883°N 1.205°W

Knowle
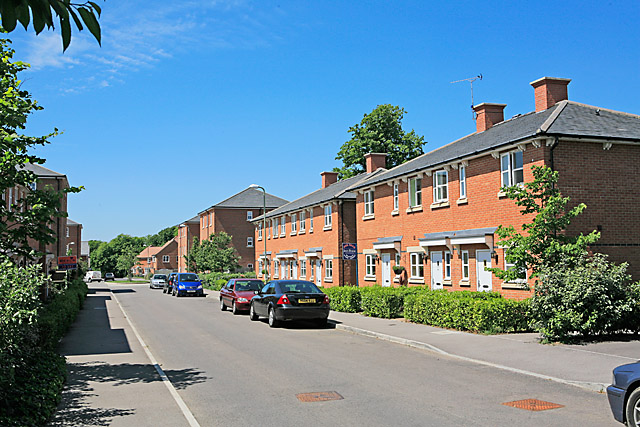

- Location within Hampshire
- Population: 1,511 — 2011 census: larger output areas
- OS grid reference: SU559095
- Civil parish: Wickham and Knowle
- District: Winchester
- Shire county: Hampshire
- Region: South East
- Country: England
- Sovereign state: United Kingdom
- Post town: FAREHAM
- Postcode district: PO17
- Dialling code: 01329
- Police: Hampshire and Isle of Wight
- Fire: Hampshire and Isle of Wight
- Ambulance: South Central
- UK Parliament: Fareham and Waterlooville

Knowle is a village with mainly 21st century shops and businesses in the Winchester district of Hampshire, England, that sits high on the left bank of the Meon between the Southampton and Portsmouth conurbations. It is in the south of the parish of Wickham and Knowle in which it ranks in population about 25% behind Wickham. Its nearest town is Fareham, adjoining an inlet of Portsmouth Harbour approximately 3 miles (4.8 km) south-east.

== History ==
Knowle is built on land which, until 1849, was Knowle Farm. The farm and a little surrounding woodland which remains, mainly in the South Downs National Park, was between Fareham's small nascent exurb community of Funtley and another farm associated with Wickham. The original timber framed farmhouse, dating from the 17th century was converted into two cottages in the 20th century and is now a Grade II listed building. It stands as part of the cluster of houses known as Farm Cottages, on Mayles Lane, north of the former hospital site.

=== Knowle Hospital ===
A committee of nine JPs were appointed at the Easter Quarter Sessions in 1846 to superintend the erecting or providing of a lunatic asylum. They selected part of Knowle Farm as most suitable, namely 108 acres (44 ha).

In December 1852, after two years building, Hampshire's first County Lunatic Asylum was completed on Knowle Hill in the north of the present village. By 1856 it had taken its original capacity of 400 patients; growth ensued and by 1900 it housed over 1,000. It was named 'Knowle Mental Hospital' from c.1923 to 1948, when it was renamed 'Knowle Hospital'; it closed in 1996.

The hospital's successor is Ravenswood House, a medium-security mental health hospital which opened in 1985 to care for those afflicted by serious mental illnesses or personality disorders. It can accommodate 77 patients and is complemented by the Southfield Low Security Hospital in the New Forest. Ravenswood is the base of the Wessex Forensic Psychiatric Service.

=== Birth of the village ===
From 2000 onward the former complex of buildings was redeveloped by a group of developers (Berkeley Homes (lead developer), Bovis Homes, Westbury Homes, Try Homes, Barry Jupe and A2Dominion) adding to Knowle Village (village). This comprised 130 apartments (using the former hospital buildings) houses over 53 acres (210,000 m^{2}). The principal northern (east-west) building, northern administration building, south block, superintendent's house, chapel and staff cottages were retained and converted to other uses, whilst the central north–south connecting structure and other periphery buildings were demolished.

The redevelopment, coupled with the hamlet which pre-dates, created the first village in Hampshire in over a century, one without a church but with many other amenities.

=== Demolished station ===
Knowle for many decades had Knowle Halt, a railway halt, on the Eastleigh to Fareham and Meon Valley lines. The station closed on the 6 April 1964 with the platforms demolished shortly thereafter.

=== Chapel ===
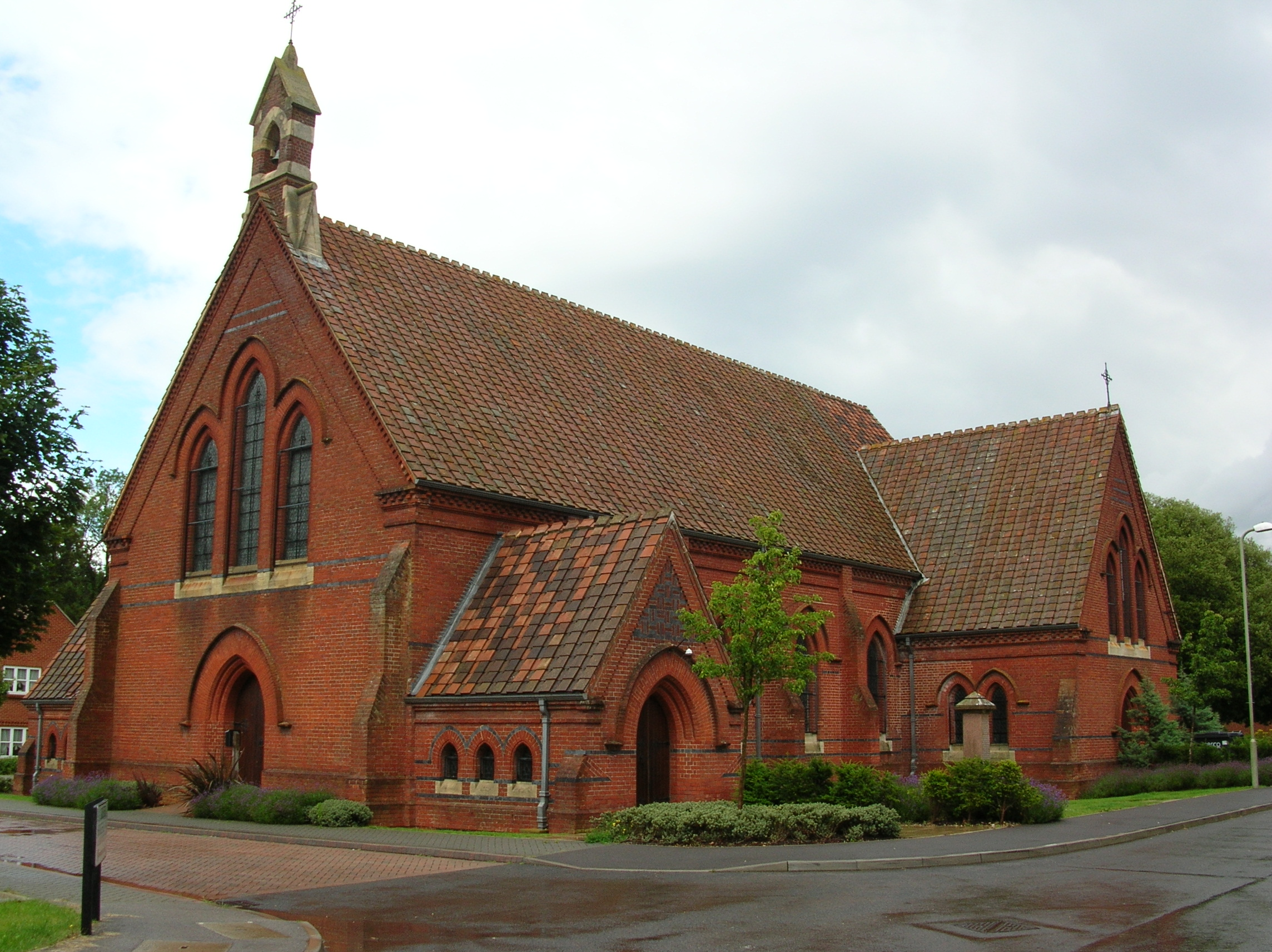
The Chapel

Part of the old hospital was a red brick Chapel, with small belfry dressed in stone, built in 1875 to free up space in the main building.

As part of the redevelopment of the complex, the chapel was refurbished by Berkeley Homes, at a cost exceeding £400,000. They later transferred ownership of the building to Winchester City Council for £1, with an additional gift of £28,000 to provide some funding for future maintenance costs. The building, which is listed, was leased by the Knowle Community Buildings Association (KCBA) for community use.

== Amenities ==
=== Business Park ===
Knowle Village Business Park was gradually built from 2003.

== Community Hall and cricket club ==
The KCBA vacated the former Chapel for a new build Community Hall adjacent to the cricket pitch, and the chapel was sold in July 2012 for £220,000 by Clive Emson Auctioneers.

== Memorials ==
=== Cemetery ===
Over 5,500 former patients of the asylum are buried in Knowle Cemetery. Before 1886 the location of any specific body was not recorded. Up to four patients could be buried per grave, never on the same day. The last burial at the site took place in 1971. A few remaining iron crosses, generally being the memorials, were removed in 2001 for secure storage pending a decision to relocate them.

=== War memorial ===
In 1920 a war memorial was erected at Knowle Hospital to honor the 16 staff and estate residents who died during World War I. After World War II, two further names were added to the memorial. Following the closure of the hospital, the memorial was moved from the site due to the redevelopment. With a contribution from the War Memorials Trust, it was relocated to the churchyard of St. Nicholas in Wickham. By 2010, the memorial had been moved back to Knowle and now stands outside the former hospital chapel.
