= Orbitoclast =

Surgical instrument

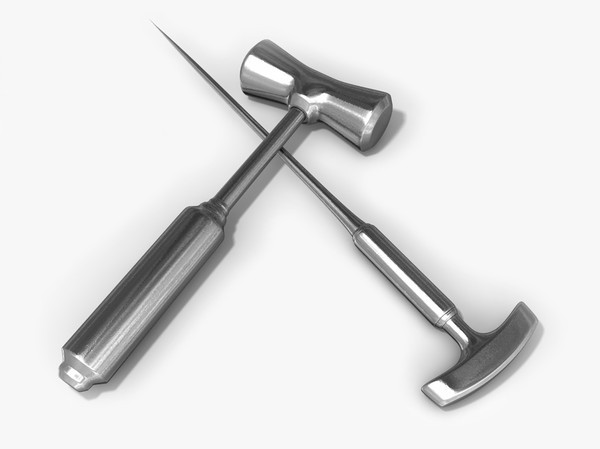

An orbitoclast is a surgical instrument used for performing transorbital lobotomies.

Because actual ice picks were used in initial experimentation and because of continued close resemblance to ice pick shafts, the procedure was dubbed "ice pick lobotomy".

== History and description ==
It was invented by Dr. Walter Freeman in 1948 to replace the unique form of leucotome used up until that point for the transorbital lobotomy procedure. This instrument is, essentially, an ice pick with some gradation marks etched onto the shaft. The operation involved placing the pick behind the eye socket of the patient and breaking through the thin layer of bone found there by applying a hammer to the end of the pick and driving the instrument into the frontal lobes. The pick would then be swung medially and laterally to separate the frontal lobes from the thalamus. In 1948, Freeman embellished the procedure by adding the deep frontal cut, an additional swing of the pick deep into the lobe which placed such an increase of strain on the instrument that it occasionally snapped off while in the patient's head, necessitating surgical retrieval. Thus, Freeman had the orbitoclast specially commissioned as a more durable and reliable replacement. The Nobel Prize for Physiology or Medicine of 1949 was awarded to Egas Moniz "for his discovery of the therapeutic value of leucotomy in certain psychoses."

== See also ==
- Lobotomy
- Leucotome
- Instruments used in general surgery
