= Hedge End railway station =

Railway station in Hampshire, England

Coordinates: 50°55′59″N 1°17′43″W

Hedge End
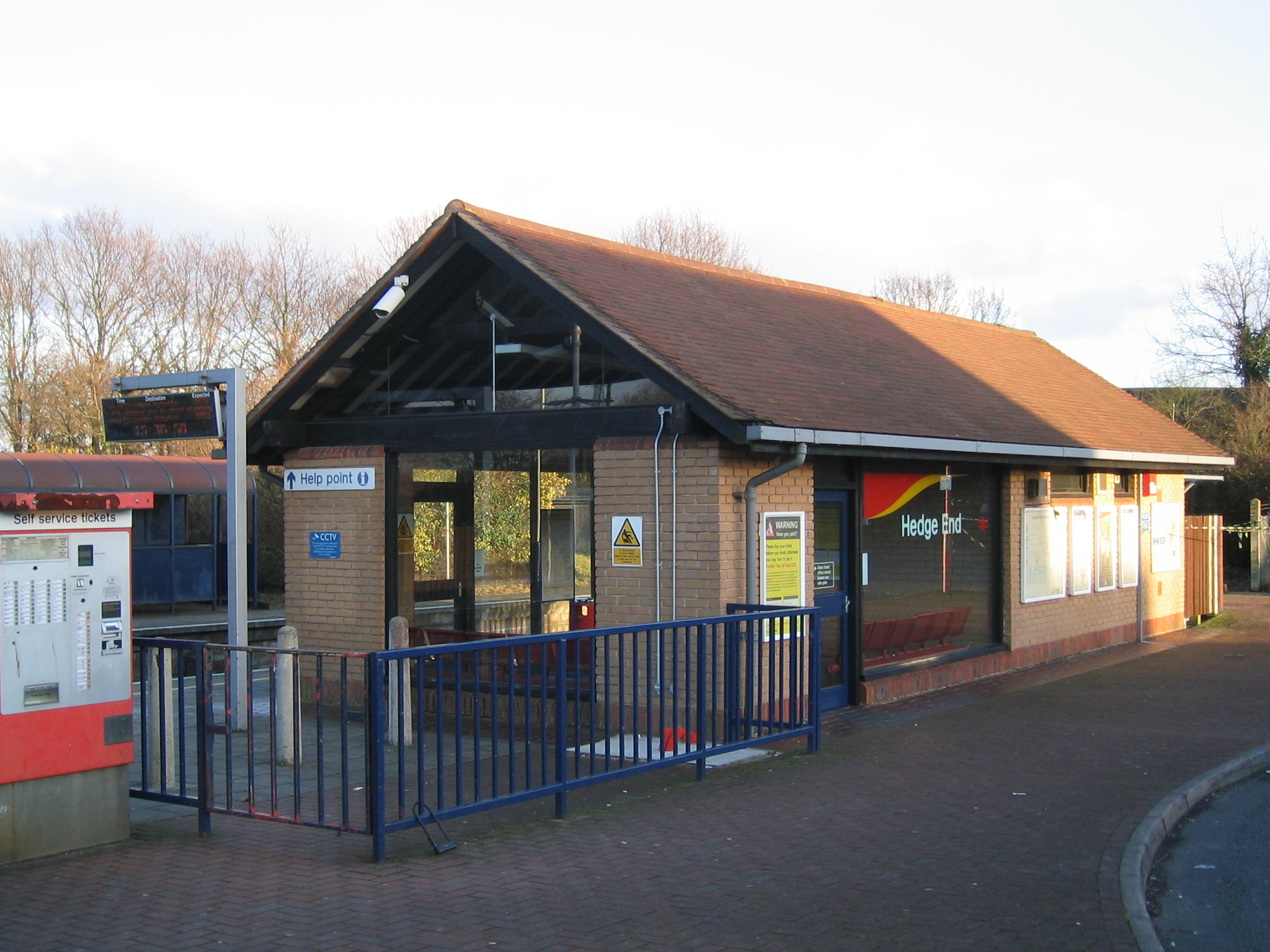
- Hedge End station building

General information
- Location: Hedge End, Eastleigh; England
- Grid reference: SU496149
- Managed by: South Western Railway
- Platforms: 2

Other information
- Station code: HDE
- Classification: DfT category E

History
- Opened: 9 May 1990
- Original company: British Rail

Passengers
- 2020/21: ▼97,412
- 2021/22: ▲0.274 million
- 2022/23: ▲0.340 million
- 2023/24: ▲0.363 million
- 2024/25: ▲0.402 million
Location
Notes
- Passenger statistics from the Office of Rail and Road

Hedge End railway station is situated on the northern edge of the town of Hedge End in the English county of Hampshire. The station was opened by British Rail in 1990, and is on the railway line between Eastleigh and Fareham. It is 76 miles 76 chains (123.8 km) from London Waterloo.

== Services ==
South Western Railway operate all off-peak services at Hedge End using Class 444 and 450 EMUs.

The typical off-peak service in trains per hour is:

- 1 tph to London Waterloo via Basingstoke
- 1 tph to Portsmouth Harbour

During the weekday peak hours, the service is increased to 2 tph.

The station is also served by a single Great Western Railway service from Cardiff Central to Portsmouth Harbour on weekdays only. This service is operated using Class 165 and 166 DMUs.

Preceding station	National Rail	Following station
Eastleigh	South Western Railway Eastleigh–Fareham line	Botley
Eastleigh	Great Western Railway Eastleigh–Fareham line Limited Service	Botley
