= Knowle Hospital =

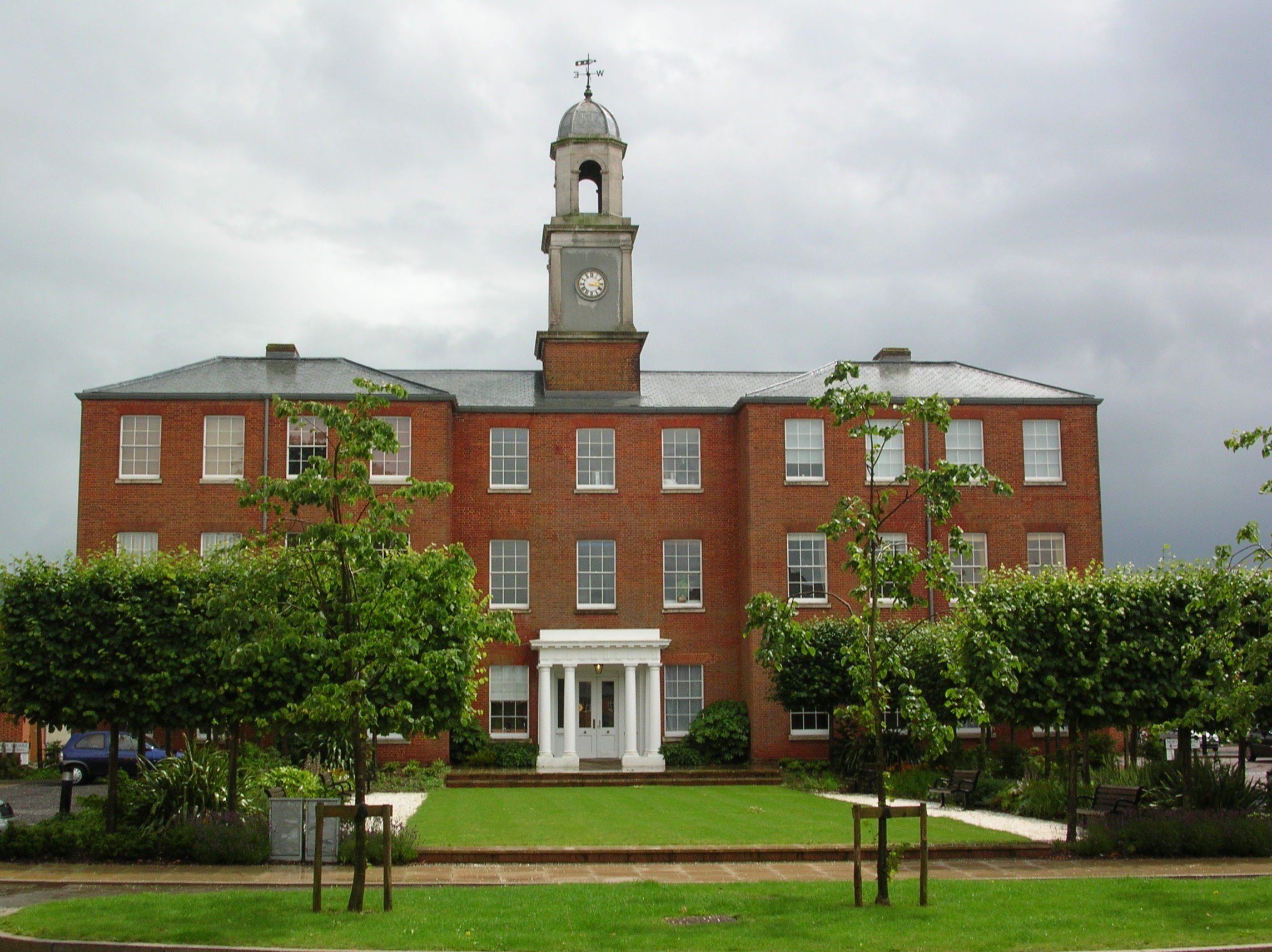
- Former main asylum building, now apartments

- Shown in Hampshire

Geography
- Location: Knowle, Hampshire, England, United Kingdom
- Coordinates: 50.881570°N 1.204048°W

Organisation
- Care system: NHS
- Type: Specialist
- Affiliated university: University of Southampton

Services
- Emergency department: No Accident & Emergency
- Speciality: Psychiatric

Helipads
- Helipad: No

History
- Founded: 1852
- Closed: 1996

Links
- Lists: Hospitals in England

Knowle Hospital was a psychiatric hospital that was repurposed as the village of Knowle near the town of Fareham in Hampshire, southern England, which opened in 1852 and closed in 1996.

== History ==
A committee of nine JPs were appointed at the Easter Quarter Sessions in 1846 to superintend the erecting or providing of a lunatic asylum for Hampshire. They selected Knowle Farm as the most suitable available site, comprising 108 acres (0.43706 km2). The asylum was designed by James Harris and the new building, known as the Hampshire County Lunatic Asylum, opened in December 1852.

For about a year, in 1857/58, one of the gardeners at Knowle, Henry Coe, corresponded with Charles Darwin on horticultural matters, especially the cultivation of kidney beans. As a result of this correspondence, Darwin became involved in a minor dispute about the legality of a patient's detention at Knowle. Following his recovery and discharge, the patient wrote to Darwin, thanking him for taking a personal interest. A chapel was built on the site in 1875.

The asylum was renamed Knowle Mental Hospital in 1923 and then became Knowle Hospital in 1948.

In the late 1960s, Dr Ronald A. Sandison, a psychiatrist and psychotherapist who pioneered the clinical use of LSD in psychiatry, worked at Knowle Hospital.

During the 1970s, plans were drawn up to close the large county mental asylums and in 1979 mental health services for Southampton and south-west Hampshire were moved to a newly established Department of Psychiatry at Royal South Hants Hospital in Southampton.

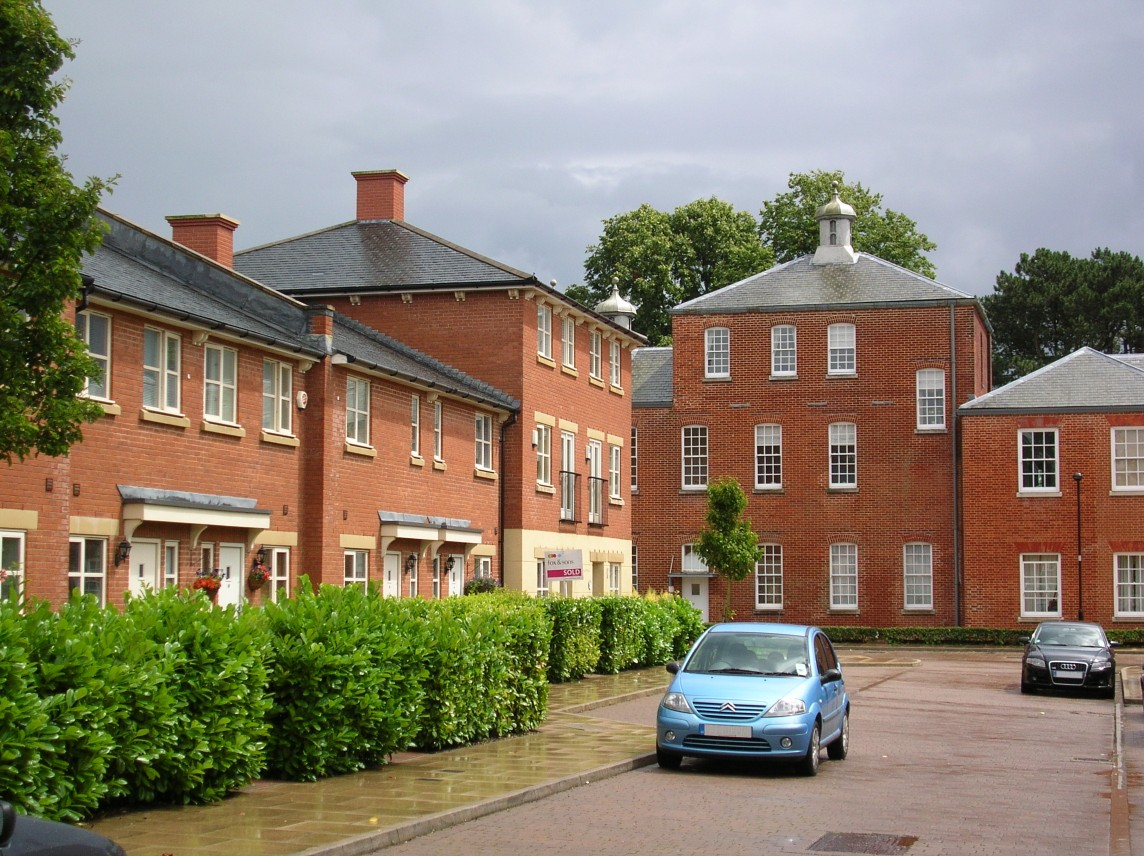
New and old buildings forming Knowle Village

Part of the hospital site was home to the Hampshire Ambulance Service Knowle Training School in the 1980s. Knowle Hospital closed in 1996 and the site was subsequently redeveloped for residential use as Knowle Village.

== Transport ==
Knowle Halt, a small railway station on the Eastleigh–Fareham line, served the asylum from 1907. The station (which also served the village of Funtley) was closed in 1964. Trains from the Meon Valley Railway, a cross-country railway in Hampshire, also served Knowle Halt.

== See also ==
- List of hospitals in England
