= Botley railway station =

Railway station in Hampshire, England

Botley
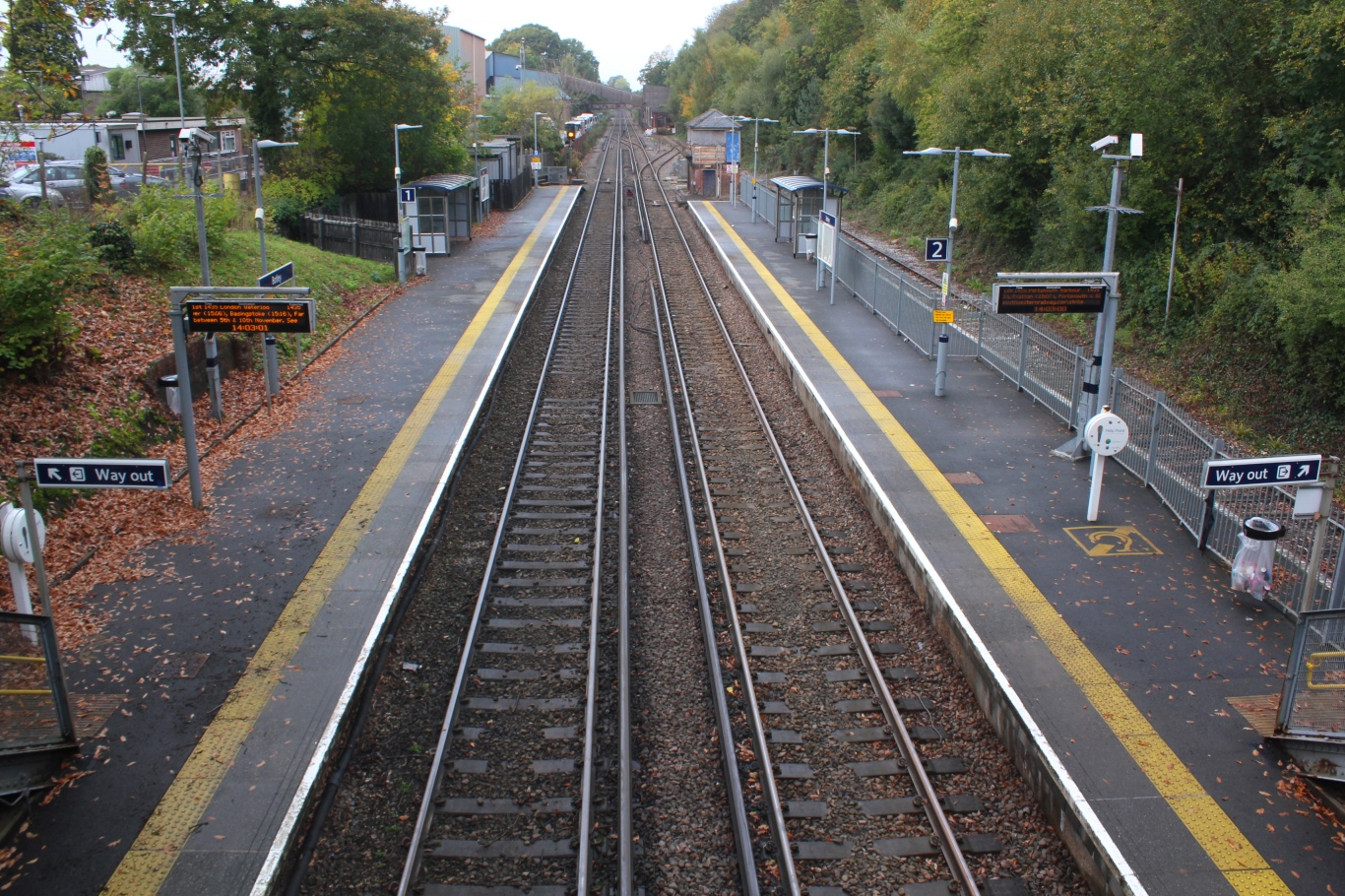
- Botley station (seen from the footbridge)

General information
- Location: Botley, City of Winchester; England
- Coordinates: 50.917°N 1.259°W
- Grid reference: SU521132
- Managed by: South Western Railway
- Platforms: 2

Other information
- Station code: BOE
- Classification: DfT category F2

History
- Opened: 29 November 1841
- Original company: London and South Western Railway
- Pre-grouping: London and South Western Railway
- Post-grouping: Southern Railway

Passengers
- 2020/21: ▼34,436
- 2021/22: ▲0.104 million
- 2022/23: ▲0.125 million
- 2023/24: ▲0.135 million
- 2024/25: ▲0.155 million
Location
Notes
- Passenger statistics from the Office of Rail and Road

Botley railway station serves Botley and the surrounding areas in the English county of Hampshire. The station is on the railway line between Eastleigh and Fareham, 78 miles 72 chains (127.0 km) from London Waterloo.

Although named after the nearby village of Botley, which is within the boundaries of the Borough of Eastleigh, the station is actually located in the civil parish of Curdridge, which falls within the boundaries of the City of Winchester.

== History ==
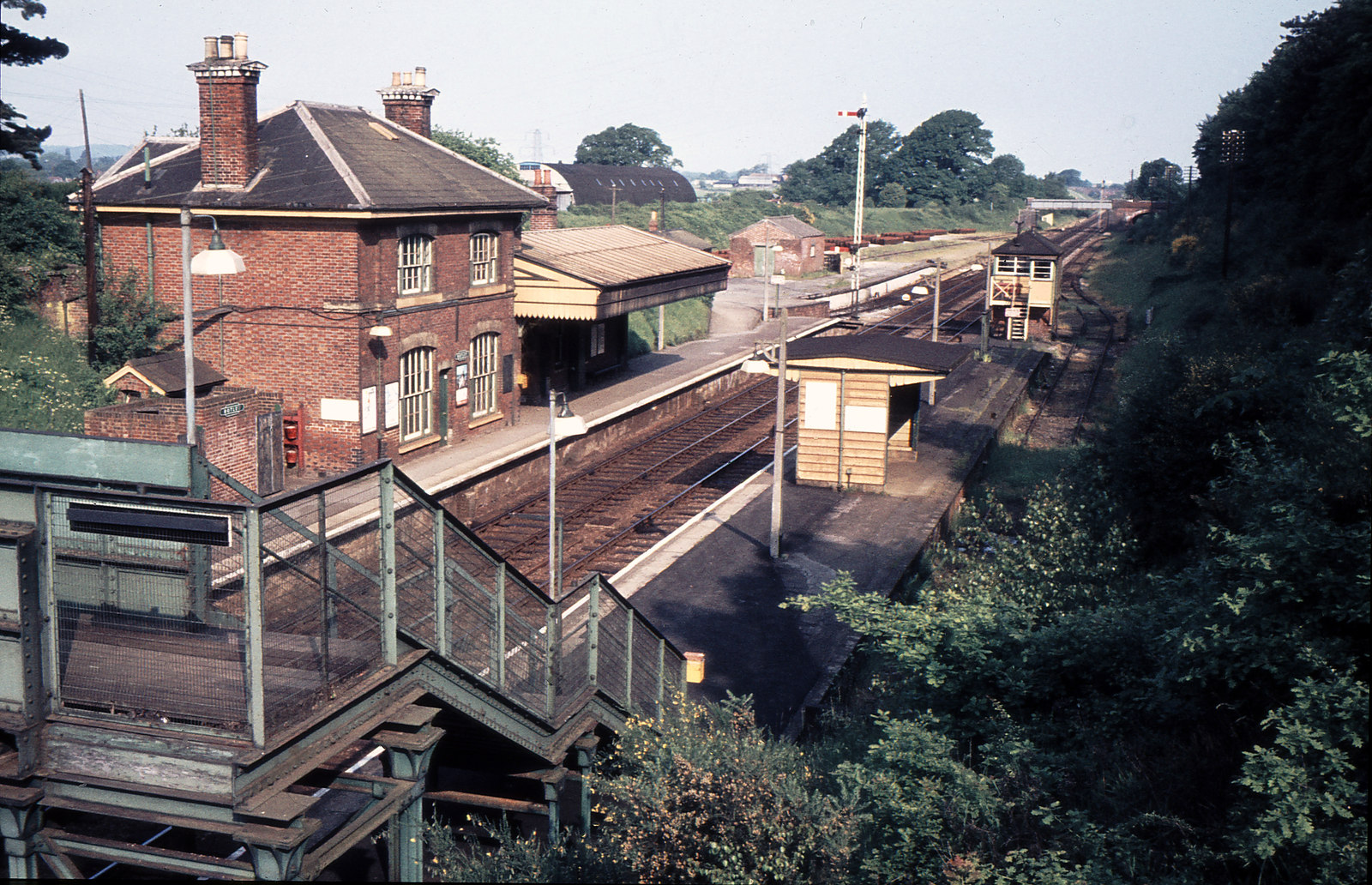
Botley station in 1969

Botley station was first opened on 29 November 1841 by the London and South Western Railway (LSWR). However it closed again on 3 December that year, due to an earthslip, before reopening on 7 February 1842. Botley was once the junction for the Bishops Waltham branch which was opened in 1863 and finally closed to freight in 1962. Some of the track from the branch still exists as a long siding and is used by Aggregate Industries which operate an aggregate railhead depot and coated roadstone plant at Botley.

The station was a major loading point for strawberry traffic until about 1940, with trains taking the local produce up to London. The station possessed an extensive network of sidings and loading bays for this seasonal traffic and for storing the special ventilated vans that transported the fruit. The goods yard is now occupied by the Aggregate Industries stone plant. All traffic declined from 1950 onwards, but passenger numbers began to build again in the 1990s with the re-introduction of direct services to London for the first time since before the war. The line was electrified, on the 3rd rail system, in the 1990s. The station and route was again closed due to a land slip on 31 January 2014. The line reopened on 15 March 2014.

The station was refurbished in Summer 2015. New lighting, barriers and repainting took place. The platforms were also resurfaced.

== Services ==
South Western Railway operate all off-peak services at Botley using Class 444 and 450 EMUs.

The typical off-peak service in trains per hour is:

- 1 tph to London Waterloo via Basingstoke
- 1 tph to Portsmouth Harbour

During the weekday peak hours, the service is increased to 2 tph.

The station is also served by a single Great Western Railway service from Cardiff Central to Portsmouth Harbour on weekdays only. This service is operated using Class 165 and 166 DMUs.

Preceding station	National Rail	Following station
Hedge End	South Western Railway Eastleigh to Fareham Line	Fareham
Hedge End	Great Western Railway Eastleigh to Fareham Line Limited Service	Fareham
	Disused railways	
Terminus	London and South Western Railway Bishops Waltham branch	Bishops Waltham (1862-1909); Durley Halt (1909-1933)
