= Ice pick =

Tool used to break up ice

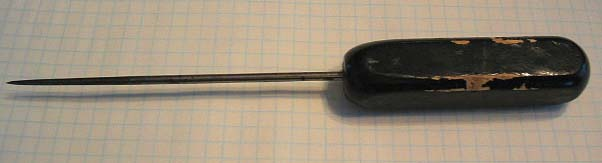
A standard ice pick

An ice pick is a pointed metal tool used to break, pick or chip at ice. The design consists of a sharp metal spike attached to a handle. Though traditionally made out of wood, modern variants may have a plastic or rubber handle to improve safety and grip. Otherwise, the tool's design has been relatively unchanged since its invention.

== History ==
During the 1800s, ice blocks were gathered from frozen water sources and distributed to nearby homes. Ice picks were used to easily cut the blocks into smaller pieces for use. In many cases these smaller blocks were used in iceboxes. Iceboxes are similar in use to refrigerators, with the major difference being that iceboxes could only stay cold for a limited time. They needed to be restocked with ice regularly to continue proper functioning. The ice pick slowly began to lose popularity beginning in the early to mid-1900s due to the creation of the modern refrigerator. Many refrigerators came with a built-in ice maker which allowed for easy access to small ice chunks at any time and eliminated the need for the ice pick.

== Modern usage ==
Some bartenders will carve or chip blocks of ice into aesthetically pleasing shapes to be served with their drinks, using tools including an ice pick.

Because blocks of ice melt much more slowly than cubes, sailors, campers and others who will be away from civilization for periods of time may carry blocks of ice along with an ice pick to shape and serve the blocks.

== Use as weapon ==
Because of its availability and ability to puncture the skin easily, the ice pick has sometimes been used as a weapon. Most notoriously, New York's organized crime groups known as Murder Incorporated made extensive use of the ice pick as a weapon during the 1930s and 1940s. There were up to 1,000 murders committed by this group. In 1932, the bodies of two young men were found who had been stabbed numerous times with an ice pick. A man named Jacob Drucker was found guilty of murdering a man in 1944. His victim had been stabbed with an ice pick over 20 times. The most feared hitman of his day, Abe Reles, used the ice pick as his weapon of choice, usually stabbing his victims in the ear.

According to New York City police, ice picks are still used today as street weapons. On August 21, 2012, a man was attacked with an ice pick in the Bronx. John Martinez, a man from the Bronx, was convicted of several robberies using an ice pick in 2011.

Murderer Richard Kuklinski, who claimed to have killed over 200 people, was reported to have used an ice pick among other weapons.

During the early morning of August 16, 1975, Utah Highway Patrol Trooper Robert Hayward arrested Serial Killer Ted Bundy, amongst the items found during a search of Ted's Volkswagen was a brown gym bag containing a red handled ice pick along with handcuffs, rope, ski mask, panty hose mask, flashlight, GLAD garbage bags, and other incriminating items.

Leon Trotsky is sometimes incorrectly said to have been killed with an ice pick. He was actually killed with an ice axe, a mountaineering tool.

An item that resembled an ice pick (later revealed as a screwdriver) and a kitchen knife were used by Luka Magnotta to murder Jun Lin in 2012.

== Use in medicine ==
The lobotomy was a medical treatment that gained popularity during the mid-1930s. Lobotomist Walter Freeman performed thousands of lobotomies across the world. Though he would later use a specially commissioned tool called an orbitoclast, he reportedly originally experimented using an ice pick from his family's kitchen. The pick would be inserted into the brain through the eye socket. The procedure would be done without the use of anesthetics. This "Ice Pick Lobotomy" was believed to diminish mental issues, however, these often resulted in paralysis and early death. This treatment failed due to a lack of testing before being performed on thousands of people. Walter Freeman's medical license was revoked in 1967 after a woman died during a lobotomy. This method of lobotomy led to the deaths of around 500 people over the course of 50 years. By the 1970s, the procedure would be banned in many countries for being "inhumane".

== In popular culture ==
In the 1992 film Basic Instinct, the character Catherine Tramell (played by Sharon Stone) is strongly associated with an ice pick, used in the film’s infamous opening murder scene.
