= Powick Asylum Music =

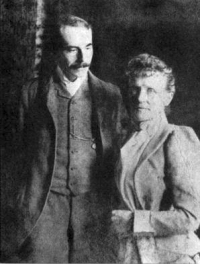
Edward and Alice Elgar, c. 1891

The Powick Asylum Music consists of a number of sets of dance music – quadrilles and polkas – written by Edward Elgar during his time as bandmaster at the Worcester City and County Lunatic Asylum (later Powick Asylum) between 1879 and 1884. The music was not published, but the original manuscripts of instrumental parts are preserved in the collection of the Elgar Birthplace Museum.

== History ==
In 1879 Elgar, at the age of 22, was appointed bandmaster at the Worcester City and County Lunatic Asylum. The band – formed from the attendants, not the patients – was needed to provide music at the regular dances for the patients. Elgar had already played violin in the band for two years. His one day a week there was his first regular job of composing or conducting. Elgar's duties were to train and conduct the band, and he was expected to have practical knowledge of the technique of flute, oboe, clarinet, euphonium and all string instruments. He was paid £32 annually – £4 per annum less than his predecessor, no doubt because of his inexperience. Additionally he was paid 5 shillings for each polka and quadrille he composed for the band, and one shilling and sixpence for accompaniments to the Christy's Minstrels ditties of the day.

The Musical Times wrote, "This practical experience proved to be of the greatest value to the young musician. ... He acquired a practical knowledge of the capabilities of these different instruments. ... He thereby got to know intimately the tone colour, the ins and outs of these and many other instruments."

Although Elgar had no other settled position, increasing demands on his time and his growing aspirations as a composer (an orchestral work Sevillaña had just been written and performed in Worcester and London) led him, in the autumn of 1884, to resign as bandmaster at Powick Asylum.

British musicologist Percy M. Young, in his 1973 Elgar O.M.: a study of a musician, relates how, in old age, Elgar liked to deflate affectation on the part of sycophantic visitors by starting a conversation with the words "When I was at the Lunatic Asylum..."

== Music ==
For some time before his appointment as bandmaster at Powick Asylum, Elgar had already been playing his violin in occasional concerts given for the inmates. In December 1878 he learnt that the post of director of the asylum band was to fall vacant at the new year, so by way of a demonstration of his composing skill he wrote a Minuet in G minor for the small band, dated 21 December 1878, and this may be considered the first of the Asylum Music pieces. Of the music written during his time there as bandmaster, there are ten sets. The sets of quadrilles (including Lancers) each have five dances, which have individual names only in the Paris set. The titles and dedications were written by the composer on the front page of each manuscript.

- 1. La Brunette: Quadrilles. "Dedicated (with every feeling of regard and esteem) to Geo. Jenkins Esq." George Jenkins was the Asylum Clerk. Elgar's first work for the band. 1879.
- 2. Die Junge Kokette: Quadrilles (or Caledonians). "Dedicated (with permission) to Miss J. Holloway." – the Asylum pianist and organist. The opening of the third quadrille was later used in the first movement, "March", of his second “Wand of Youth” Suite. Die kleine Coquette was a suggested variant of the title. 18 May 1879.
- 3. L’Assomoir: Quadrilles. The fifth quadrille was later used, titled "The Wild Bears”, in the last movement of his second "Wand of Youth” Suite. The popular novel L'Assommoir by Émile Zola had recently (1877) been published. 11 September 1879.

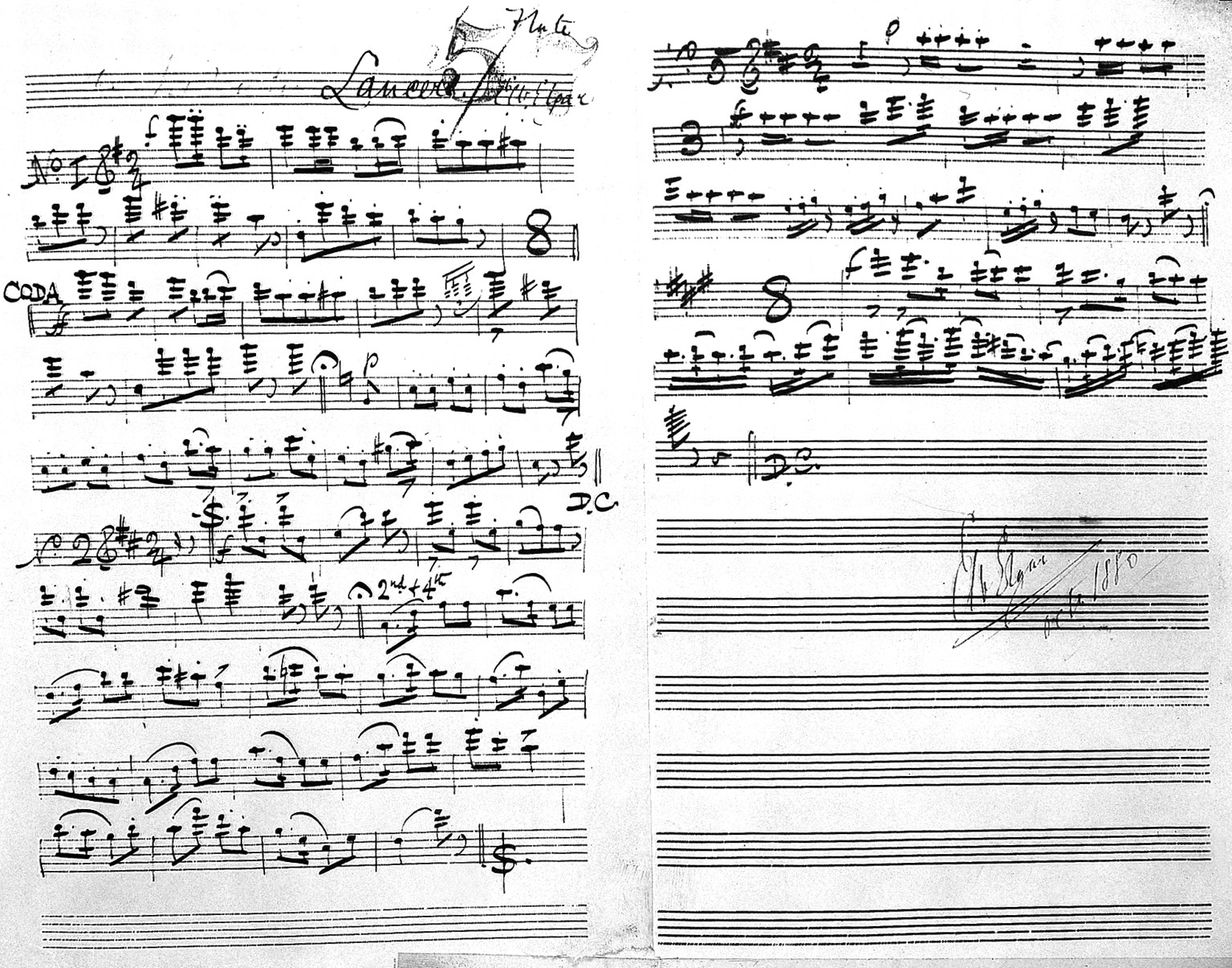
Flute part for The Valentine (Lancers), 1880, signed by Edward Elgar.

- 4. The Valentine: Set of Lancers. Clearly to celebrate Valentine's Day (14 February). 2–15 February 1880.
- 5. Maud: Polka. Elgar's first polka. 30 May 1880.
- 6. Paris: Quadrilles. "(introducing French songs). Dedicated to Miss J. Holloway, Powyke". Elgar's first visit abroad was to Paris in 1880, which he visited with Charlie Pipe who was to marry Elgar's sister Lucy a year later, and the titles reflect Elgar's impressions. They incorporate popular French songs, for example "La femme de l’emballeur" in the last quadrille. 17 October 1880.
  - 1. Châtelet.
  - 2. L'Hippodrome
  - 3. Alcazar d'Été (Champs Élysées)
  - 4. La! Suzanne!
  - 5. Café des Ambassadeurs: "La femme de l’emballeur".
- 7. Nelly: Polka. Attributed by Elgar to “Fras. Thos. Elgar” (his brother Frank, in an attempt to encourage him to compose). Nelly was the familiar name of Elgar's friend Helen Weaver, to whom he was for a short while engaged. October 1881.
- 8. La Blonde: Polka. "Grande Polka de Concert", with the dedication in German "H. J. W. vom Leipzig gewidmet". Helen Weaver was studying in Leipzig at the time and Elgar visited her there at the end of the year. 15 October 1882.
- 9. Helcia: Polka. Signed “Edward Elgar. Composer in ordinary to the W. C. & C. L. A.” The closing chords are those which open the song "Sabbath Morning at Sea" in Elgar's “Sea Pictures”. 1 October 1883.
- 10. Blumine: Polka. Inscribed "von Eduard Wilhelm". Elgar's last composition for the band, and the most advanced in its scoring. 22 May 1884.

== Instrumentation ==
The dances are scored (with a few exceptions) for piccolo, flute, clarinet, two cornets, euphonium, bombardon, 1st and 2nd violins, double bass and a piano.

Each dance was scored according to the instruments available at the time, so a viola part was only added to the string section in Nelly and Helcia; the piccolo was dropped from L’Assomoir and Blumine; the flute dropped from La Blonde, Helcia and Blumine; in La Blonde a trombone replaces the euphonium; and Die Junge Kokette has neither trombone or euphonium. The players were found from the staff of the asylum. The band was led by a young pianist, Miss J. Holloway, and Elgar dedicated two of the pieces to her.

== Recordings ==
- Elgar's Music for the Powick Asylum Rutland Sinfonia conducted by Barry Collett.

== Sources ==
- Kennedy, Michael (1987). Portrait of Elgar (third ed.). Oxford: Clarendon Press. ISBN 0-19-284017-7.
- Moore, Jerrold N. (1984). Edward Elgar: a Creative Life. Oxford: Oxford University Press. ISBN 0-19-315447-1.
- Reed, W.H. (1946). Elgar. London: Dent. OCLC 8858707.
- Young, Percy M. (1973). Elgar O.M.: a study of a musician. London: Collins. OCLC 869820.
