= Fareham red brick =

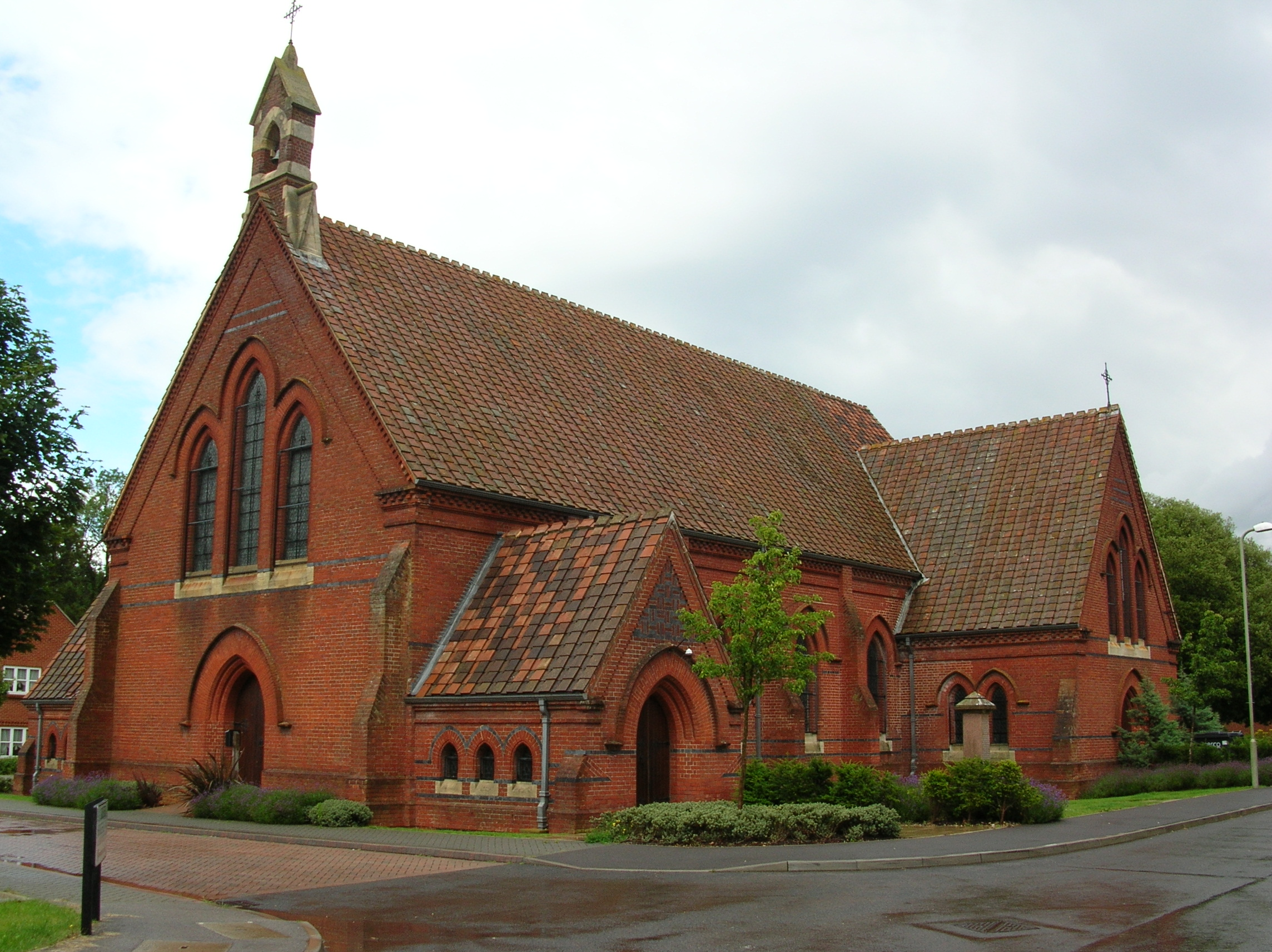
The chapel at Knowle Village, constructed in Fareham brick

Fareham red brick is a famous red-tinged clay brick, from Fareham, Hampshire. Notable buildings constructed of these distinctive bricks include London's Royal Albert Hall, and Knowle Hospital (previously known as Hampshire County Lunatic Asylum).
