= Warlingham Park Hospital =

- Water tower, the only remaining structure in the complex

- Shown in Surrey

Geography
- Location: Warlingham, Surrey, England, United Kingdom
- Coordinates: 51.31805°N 0.03117°W

Organisation
- Care system: Public NHS
- Type: Specialist

Services
- Speciality: Mental health

History
- Founded: 1903
- Closed: 1999
- Demolished: 2000

Links
- Lists: Hospitals in England

Warlingham Park Hospital was a psychiatric hospital in Warlingham, Surrey.

== History ==
The hospital, which was designed by George Oatley and Willie Swinton Skinner, was built at a cost of £200,000 and opened as the Croydon Mental Hospital on 26 June 1903. This was reputedly the first institution to be called a 'mental hospital' and never appears officially to have been called an asylum. The hospital was extended in the early 20th century with the addition of a nurses' home, two further blocks for female patients and four villas.

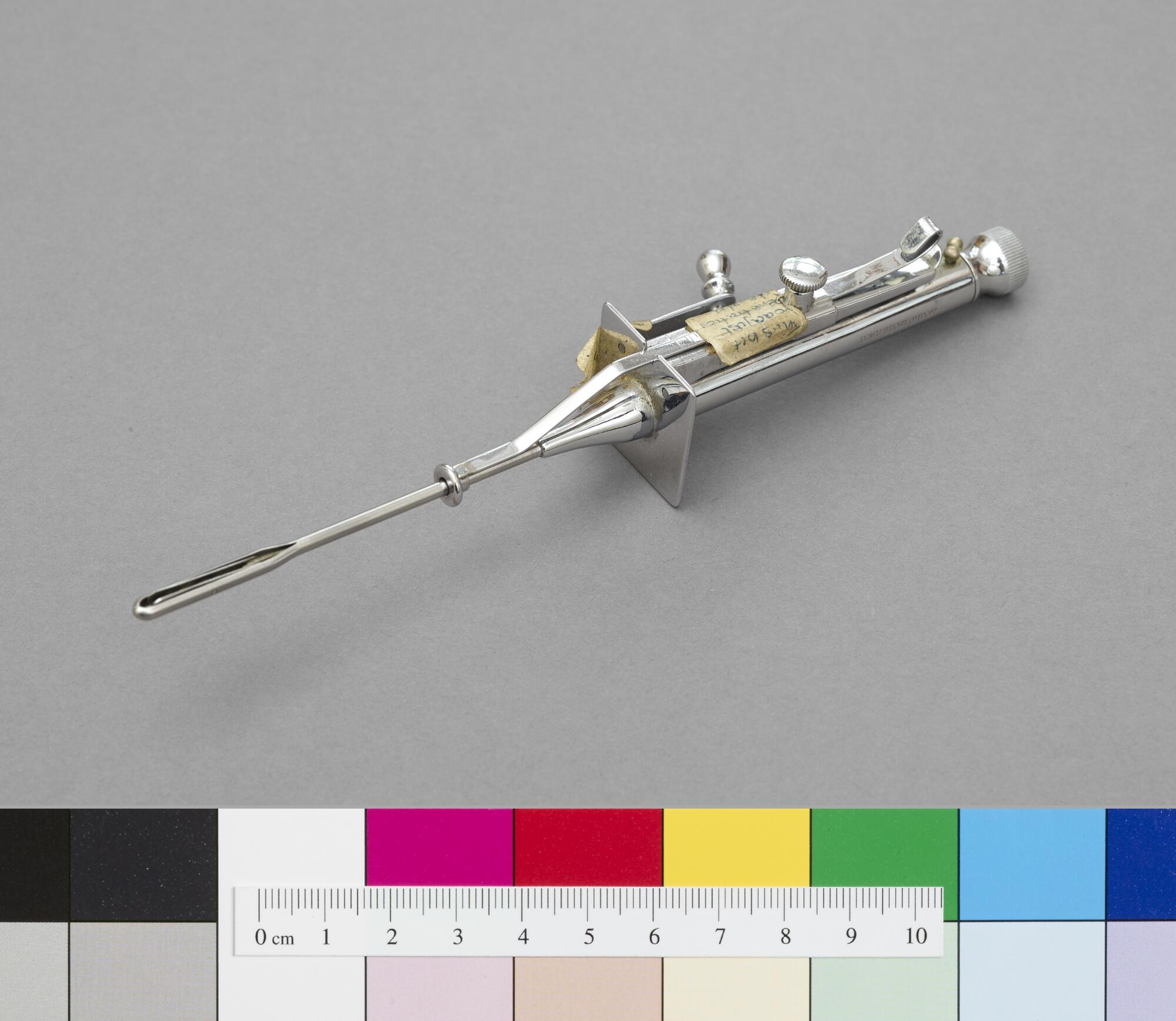
Leucotome designed by Neurosurgeon John Crumbie, 1955

The hospital was a pioneering centre for psychosurgery. Neurosurgeon John Crumbie designed his own leucotome (instrument for cutting the white matter in the brain) which was constructed by Warlingham's assistant clerk of works, and referred to by Wylie McKissock, who operated with a Cushing brain needle, as a "mechanical egg-whisk". If the patients resisted the surgery they were given electroconvulsive shocks before being anaesthetised. Crumbie performed 20 leucotomies with the instrument, it tended to catch small blood vessels causing cerebral haemorrhaging, resulting in the deaths of two patients.

The hospital also had a specialist Regional unit to treat patients suffering from alcohol dependency, Pinel House.

The hospital went on to become Warlingham Park Hospital in 1937 and joined the National Health Service in 1948. After the introduction of Care in the Community in 1983, the hospital went into a period of decline and eventually closed in 1999.

The archives were deposited with the Bethlem Royal Hospital which subsequently became the primary provider of mental health care to residents of Croydon. The records are currently available for access at Bethlem Museum of the Mind.

Demolition of the hospital began in 2000. Although the Grade II listed water tower was retained, the remainder of the buildings were demolished to make way for an up-market housing estate known as Greatpark.

== See also ==
- Healthcare in London
