= Funtley Deviation =

Former railway line and nature walk in Hampshire, England

Coordinates: 50°51′35.62″N 1°11′45.55″W

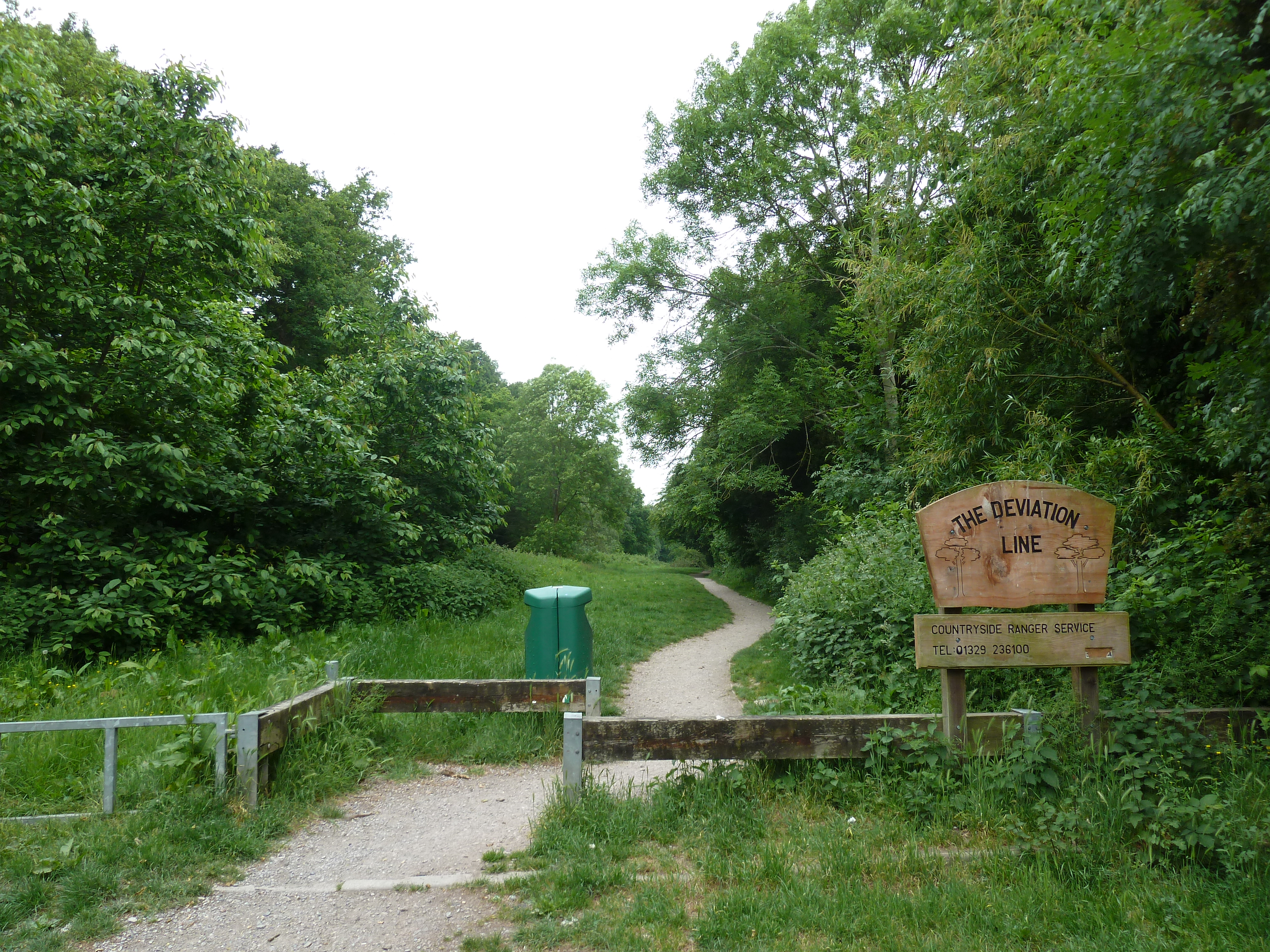
As seen from Highlands Road

The Funtley Deviation was a 2-mile (3.2 kilometres) long double track railway opened as a single line in 1904 and as a double line in 1906 to provide an alternative to the 1841 railway line north of Fareham which traversed the precarious Fareham tunnel. Unfortunately the deviation line suffered from stability problems of its own and it was eventually closed on 6 May 1973, in favour of the original route, and is now a nature walk with a small car park at the Highlands Road end. The route south of Highlands Road was sold for housing.

Fareham station was opened by the London and South Western Railway on 29 November 1841 on the line from Eastleigh to Gosport. Later additions connected Fareham station with Southampton, Portsmouth and along the coast towards Brighton. The Meon Valley Line, Gosport and Clarence Yard Line, Stokes Bay Line and Lee-on-Solent Line from Fareham have all been closed.
