= Bishops Waltham branch =

Bishop's Waltham branch

Overview
- Status: Closed
- Locale: Hampshire; South East England
- Stations: 3

Service
- Type: Heavy rail
- Operator: London and South Western Railway

History
- Opened: 1 June 1863
- Closed: 27 April 1962

Technical
- Line length: 3.8 miles
- Track gauge: 4 ft 8 1/2 in (1,435 mm)

The Bishop's Waltham branch was a railway line in Hampshire, England. It was made by a locally promoted independent company, the Bishops Waltham Railway Company. It ran from Bishop's Waltham to Botley on the Eastleigh–Fareham line of the London and South Western Railway (LSWR). The line opened on 1 June 1863.

Passenger business was never heavy, but clay pits and a brickworks and gasworks at Bishop's Waltham brought mineral traffic to the line. Nevertheless, the Bishops Waltham Railway Company was always short of money and had to be supported by the LSWR, and was absorbed by the larger company in 1881.

Competition from road transport led to dwindling passenger carryings, and the line closed to passengers in 1933. A basic goods service continued, but the line closed completely in 1962.

== History ==
=== Predecessor railways ===
The London and Southampton Railway opened its main line throughout in 1840; it was the first long-distance railway in the area. In 1841 it opened a branch line to Gosport. This was intended to serve Portsmouth, by the use of a “floating bridge” (ferry) across Portsmouth Harbour. The London and Southampton Railway had changed its name to the London and South Western Railway in an attempt to assuage sensitivities in Portsmouth, as there was considerable rivalry with Southampton.

The Gosport branch left Bishopstoke on the Southampton main line, and ran through Botley and Fareham. The failure to reach Portsmouth direct became a continuing source of resentment, and in 1848 a branch line to Cosham was opened, meeting what became a joint line from there to Portsmouth. The joint line was operated by the LSWR and the London Brighton and South Coast Railway (LBSCR) co-operatively.

Bishop's Waltham was predominantly agricultural, although some brewing and flour milling had taken place. By 1860 much of the railway network of Great Britain had been constructed, and it was plain that a small community without a railway connection was at a major economic and commercial disadvantage. Now the Petersfield Railway had been authorised to build from Midhurst to Petersfield, by the Petersfield Railway Act 1860 (23 & 24 Vict. c. clxxiii) of 23 July 1860. The Portsmouth Direct line at Petersfield had been opened in 1859.

The Petersfield Railway had been in discussion with the Chamber of Commerce in Southampton, where there was dissatisfaction with the LSWR. The ill-feeling was against it as a monopoly rail transport provider, and the potential to connect from Southampton to more easterly regions appeared attractive. A line from Southampton to Midhurst, joining with the Mid-Sussex Railway and beyond to Horsham and Three Bridges, on the LBSCR fitted the objective neatly. A 23-mile line would cost £26,000. This went to Parliament in the 1861 session, and was subject to strong opposition from the LSWR, who saw it as an obvious attempt by the LBSCR to get access into Southampton. The bill was thrown out, to the surprise of the Petersfield promoters.

Local interests in Bishop's Waltham, galvanised by a Mr Arthur Helps, a dynamic local citizen, prepared a new bill for a Bishop's Waltham, Botley and Bursledon Railway (BWB&BR), intending to deposit it for the 1862 session of Parliament. At Bursledon, as well as making a connection to river quays there, the railway was to make a junction with the LSWR Netley branch line. Once again this raised obvious concerns within the LSWR, and running powers to Southampton from Bursledon would once again get access for the LBSCR.

=== Authorisation ===
Bishops Waltham Railway Act 1862
- Act of Parliament
- Parliament of the United Kingdom
- Long title: An Act for making a Railway from Bishops Waltham to Botley.
- Citation: 25 & 26 Vict. c. cxliii

Dates
- Royal assent: 17 July 1862

Text of statute as originally enacted

Bishops Waltham Railway Act 1863
- Act of Parliament
- Parliament of the United Kingdom
- Long title: An Act to enable the Bishops Waltham Railway Company to increase their Capital, and for other Purposes.
- Citation: 26 & 27 Vict. c. lxxxv

Dates
- Royal assent: 22 June 1863

Text of statute as originally enacted

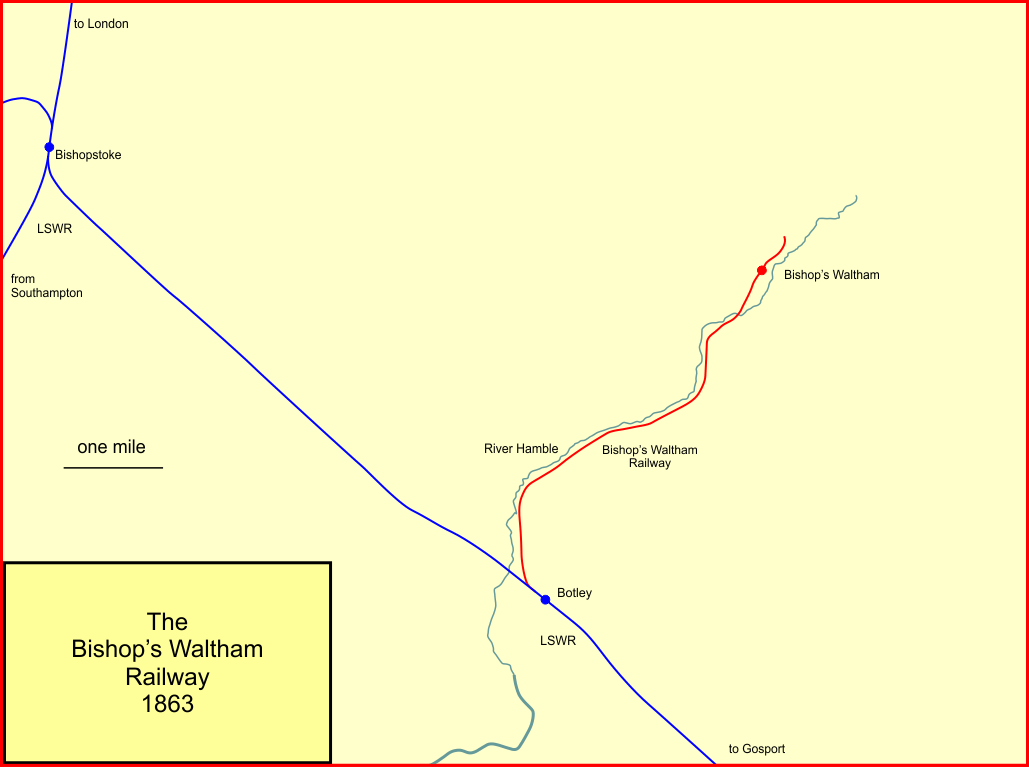
The Bishop's Waltham Railway in 1863

The LSWR made it clear it would oppose the bill in Parliament, and the BWB&BR directors negotiated with the LSWR. The latter agreed to withdraw its opposition if the Bishop's Waltham scheme omitted the Bursledon extension, reducing the line to a length of 3 1/2 miles. The Bishop's Waltham delegation agreed to this arrangement, and the LSWR withdrew its objection. The name of the BWB&BR proposal was altered to the Bishops Waltham Railway Company, and the bill passed Parliament unopposed, the Bishops Waltham Railway Act 1862 (25 & 26 Vict. c. cxliii) being dated 17 July 1862. Authorised capital was £16,000.

- A Railway commencing in a Field in the Parish of Bishops Waltham and County of Southampton to the North of the Bishops Waltham and Fishers Pond Turnpike Road, and terminating in the same Parish and County by a Junction with the London and South-western Railway, on the North Side thereof, and Ten Chains or thereabouts to the North-west of the Botley Station.
— Section 18, Bishops Waltham Railway Act 1862 (25 & 26 Vict. c. cxliii)

The local company had struggled with controlling contracts and finding the funds for construction of the line, and had long deferred arranging for building the Bishop's Waltham station, intending to make a temporary station later. Now as the line neared completion it was necessary to arrange quickly for the temporary station to be built. This was done and on 28 May 1863 Captain Rich of the Board of Trade made the necessary inspection of the line to approve it for passenger operation. Although there were some minor deficiencies, Rich was prepared to accept the company's undertaking that they would be dealt with without delay. However, there were no turntables on the line; this would be acceptable but only if a formal undertaking to use only tank engines, not tender engines, were submitted by the company. For some reason they had failed to formalise the undertaking, and Rich recommended (by letter dated 29 May 1863) refusal of the authorisation of opening, until the document was supplied. The following day the company supplied the necessary undertaking.

=== Opening to Bishop's Waltham ===
Accordingly, on 1 June 1863 the line was opened, worked by the LSWR. A train service of six trains each way daily, three on Sundays, was instituted. Steps were now taken to provide permanent passenger and goods accommodation at Bishop's Waltham, but difficulty with groundworks and the necessity to arrange finance for the work delayed matters; the new buildings were not available until March or April 1865. (Note: Both Carter and Grant erroneously state that the line first carried passengers in 1900 after being granted a light railway order. This is incorrect, stemming from confusion with a later proposal that was authorised, but never implemented. The Bishop's Waltham Railway carried passengers from the outset, and was never a light railway.)

=== Bishop's Waltham and Petersfield Railway ===
In 1863 a Petersfield and Bishop's Waltham Railway was proposed. This would approach Bishop's Waltham from the north-east, opposite the approach from Botley. The BWR must have assumed this would increase traffic on their line, making it a through railway accessible from the Guildford direction. The LSWR were against it at first, but later withdrew their opposition, and the Petersfield and Bishops Waltham Railway (BWR) was authorised by the Petersfield and Bishop's Waltham Railway Act 1864 (27 & 28 Vict. c. cccx) of 29 July 1864. In fact the state of the money market turned so difficult that the company was unable to raise subscriptions to build its line, and it applied to the Board of Trade for a certificate of abandonment, which was granted on 28 July 1868; the company had expended £2,337, mainly on parliamentary expenses.

=== Financial difficulties ===
The company struggled to make a profit, and was certainly unable to pay dividends to shareholders. A Mr Taylor had acted as the company's architect, and in February 1865 had asked for payment of his fee of £211 19s 0d. The company refused to pay him, due to the “inability of the Company from want of funds to discharge” the debt. He was offered preference shares in payment, but as the company was making no profit after paying loan interest, and Taylor saw that preference shares were worthless. He wisely declined. When he pressed for payment again in May, the directors paid him out of their own pockets to “meet the emergency”.

In January 1866 the LSWR recommended the construction of an engine shed at Bishop's Waltham, but the cost at £500 was quite out of the Bishops Waltham Railway Company's power. There were a number of other difficulties of this kind, but one of the contractors for the construction of the line named Ridley placed a claim for repayment of a bond amounting to £2,371. Evidently he had been paid partly in deferred bonds, which he now wanted repaid. The directors saw that this was completely beyond the company's means, and Ridley was awarded a judgment in Chancery against the company. However, as the company had no realisable assets other than what was directly involved in operating as a railway, the judgment did not compel any action. For the time being Ridley did not get his money, and the company was now in a state of suspense, unable to incur new expense. The directors had opened discussions with the LSWR about the larger company buying the BWR out, but this legal situation meant that the LSWR was unwilling to take the matter further until it was resolved. The LSWR continued working the line, but now retained all the receipts, towards money owed to it.

The Sunday train service was withdrawn as a means of economy, but much worse was to come. The Bishop's Waltham Clay Company, which had been a major mineral forwarder from pits at Bishop's Waltham, went into liquidation. Then in early 1867 a man called Rilson, (Note: Or Ritson.) a partner of the contractor Ridley, now served a demand for payment of his bond, in the amount of £3,204. In fact at a board meeting on 6 May 1867 a total of £11,000 in debts was listed, with no means of paying them.

The shareholders’ general meeting in August 1867 was not attended by any shareholder; evidently they all saw the company as beyond redemption.

The situation, unsatisfactory as it was, continued until 1881, with the company lacking directors or senior officials. The LSWR was unwilling for the branch line it operated to drift indefinitely, and on 11 May 1881 it indicated that it had reached agreement with the contractor creditors, and that it was in a position to purchase the BWR for £22,000. (Note: It is not at all obvious what benefit the LSWR would be getting for its money.) The transfer was agreed and for accounting purposes considered to have taken place on 4 August 1881, sanctioned retrospectively by agreements later in the same year.

== Under the LSWR ==
=== Some minor improvements ===
The new owner made some improvements to the passenger and goods timetable, but resolutely refused to reinstate the Sunday train service. The signalling system on the line was modernised too.

In a clear indication of priorities, the LSWR stated on 5 November 1904 that railmotors had been in service on the Basingstoke and Alton Light Railway, but had been taken off because of complaints about inadequate accommodation and poor ventilation. They were therefore available to work on the Bishop's Waltham line. In 1905 they operated 13 up and 12 down services; there was also an engine-worked goods trip. In 1907 a Sunday service was finally reinstated.

On 23 December 1909 a new halt was opened at Durley Mill; it is likely that the low cost of halts for railmotors, which were able to set passengers down at ground level, led to this move. The railmotors were taken off in 1915 and conventional trains were resumed.

== After 1923 ==
=== Southern Railway ===
In 1923 the process known as the Grouping of the Railways took place, following the Railways Act 1921. Most of the main line railways were compulsorily reorganised into one or other of four new large companies, the new “Groups”. The LSWR was a component of the new Southern Railway.

Passenger and goods business had declined substantially since the 1920s, as road transport became more efficient. In addition passengers from Bishop's Waltham to the large towns of Portsmouth and Southampton needed to change trains twice, at Botley and again at Fareham or Eastleigh. From 1 February 1931 the Sunday train service was withdrawn, and evening weekday services were reduced. After the last train on 31 December 1932 the passenger train service was completely withdrawn. So the line was closed on 2 January 1933

The line was usually only lightly used, with modest passenger numbers and low levels of freight, but the line usually saw a period of heavy use in the summer months during the strawberry harvest.

=== Closure ===
Passenger traffic had dwindled so far that services ceased in 1932, but freight trains ran a service three times a week until 1962. Goods train usage declined as well, and the last goods train ran on 27 April 1962.

== Locations ==
- Bishop's Waltham; opened 1 June 1863; closed 1 January 1933;
- Durley Halt; opened 23 December 1909; closed 1 January 1933;
- Botley; LSWR station; opened 29 November 1841; still open.

== Images of the line today ==
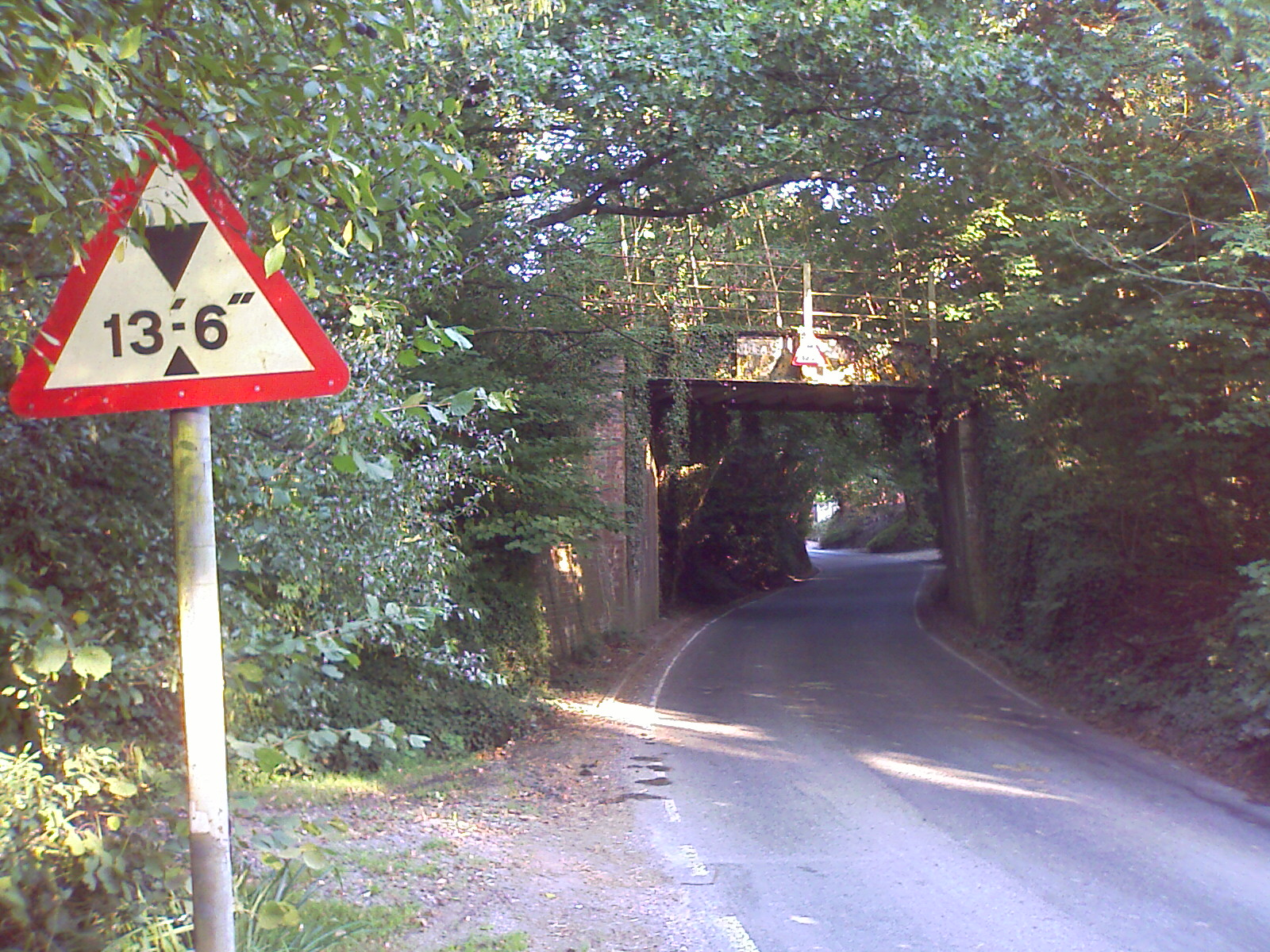
Wangfield Lane Bridge looking east, Sept 2007

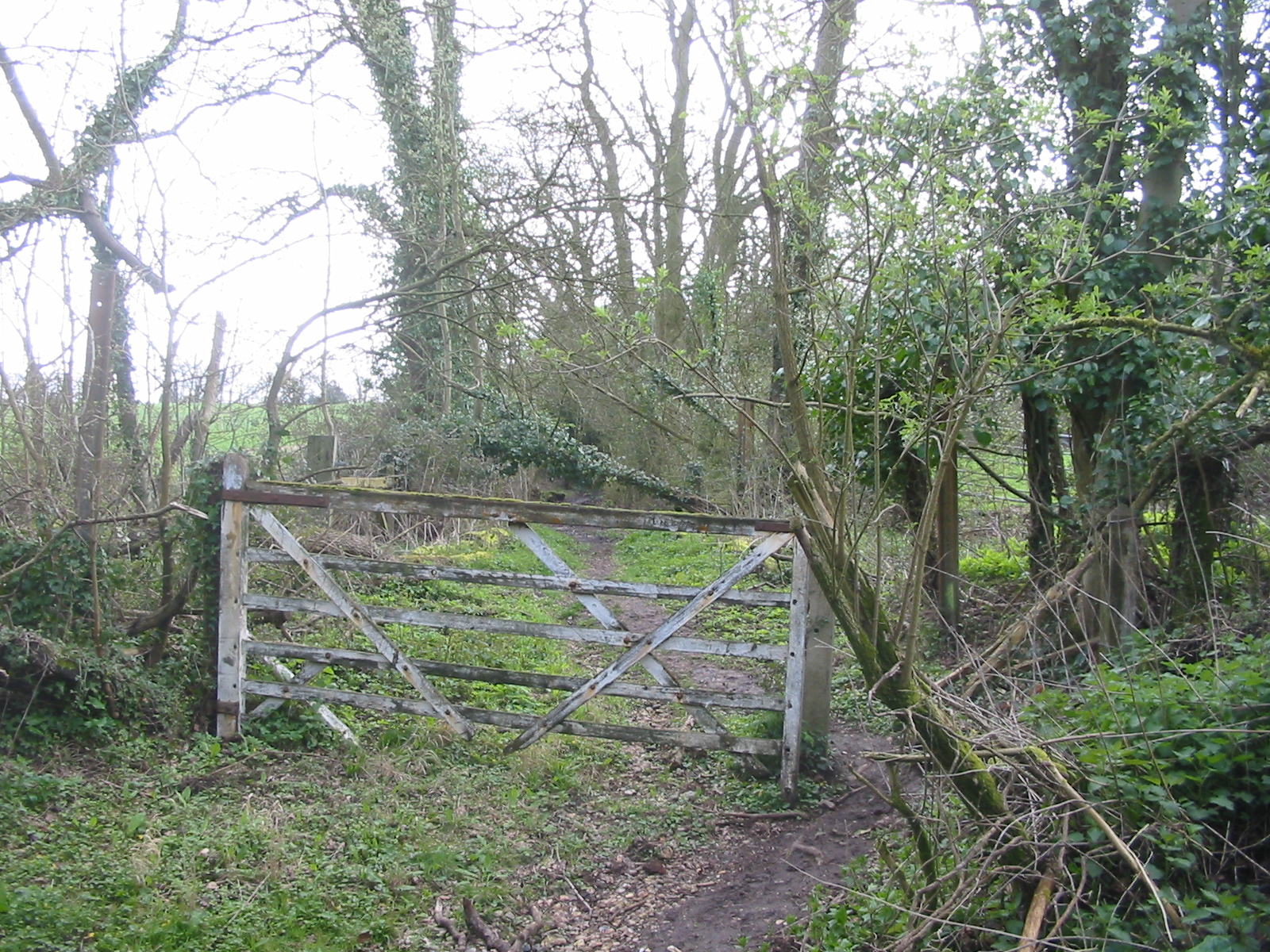
Stood on track bed looking east up Blind Lane, April 2004

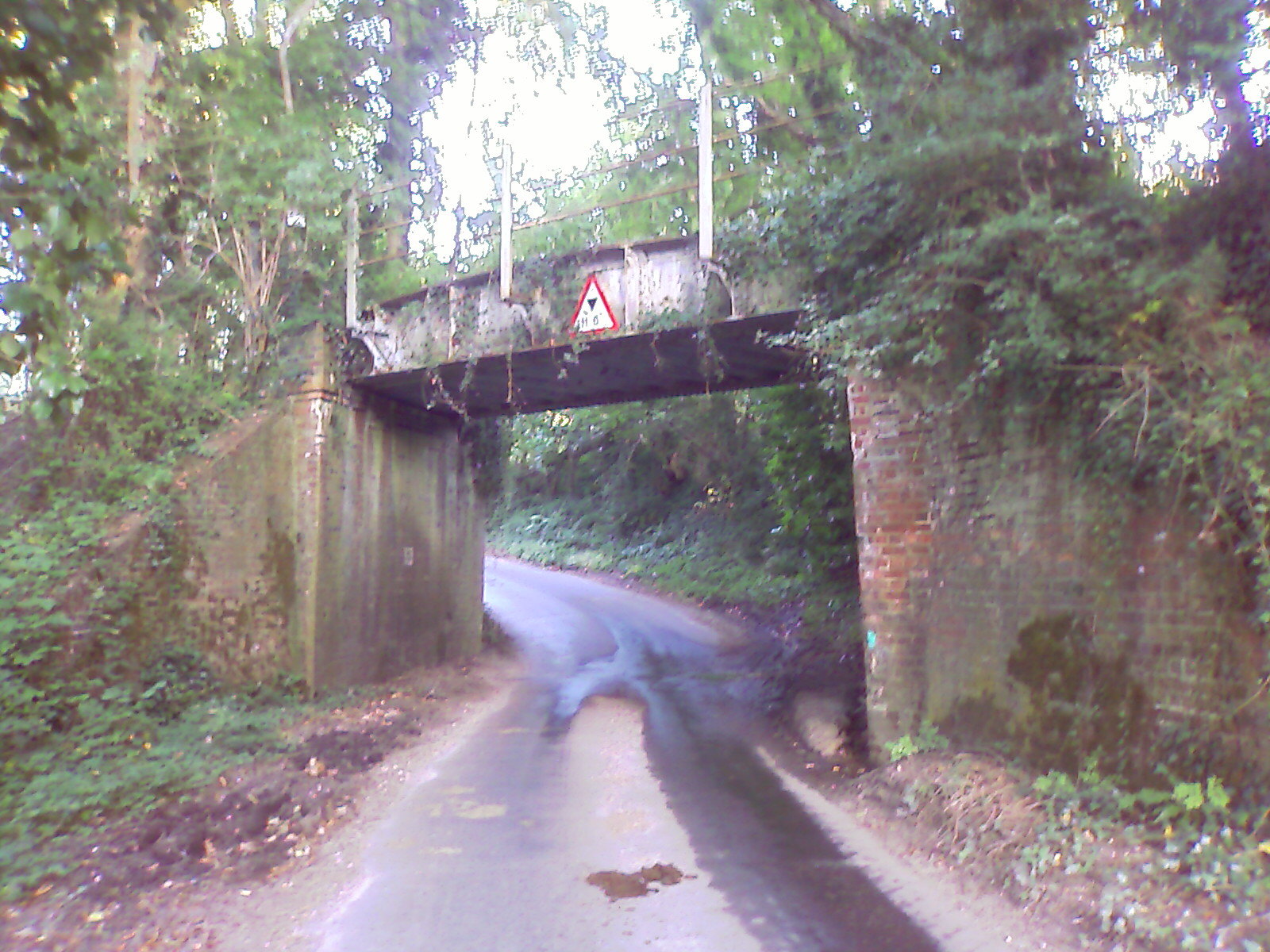
Calcot Lane Bridge looking east, Sept 2007

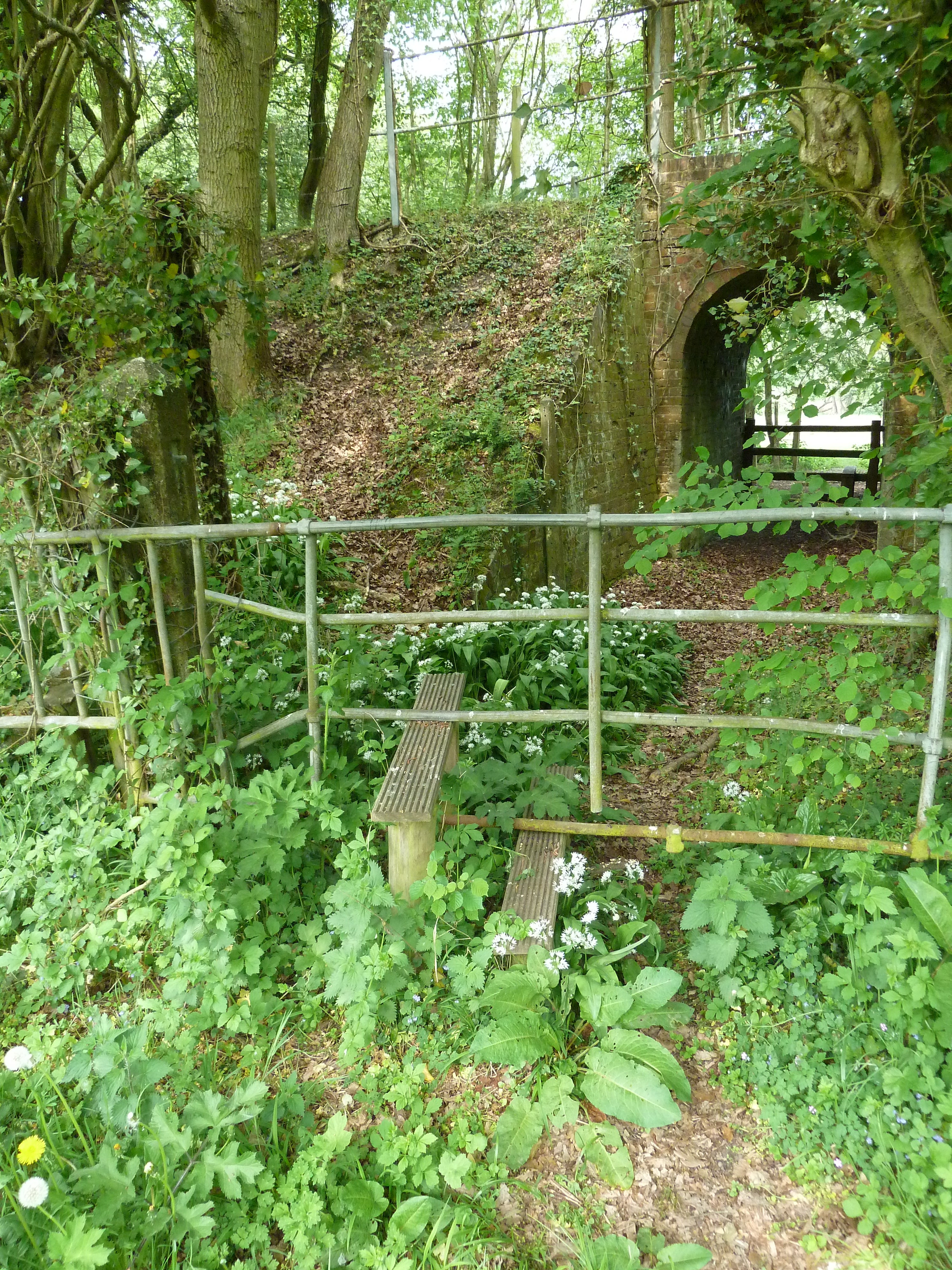
Foot tunnel under the Bishop's Waltham branch, April 2011
