= Global Burden of Disease study =

Large recurring global health study

Total disease burden

The Global Burden of Disease study (GBD) is a comprehensive regional and global research program of disease burden that assesses mortality and disability from major diseases, injuries, and risk factors. GBD is a collaboration of over 12,000 researchers from more than 160 countries. Under principal investigator Christopher J.L. Murray, GBD is based in the Institute for Health Metrics and Evaluation (IHME) at the University of Washington and funded by the Bill and Melinda Gates Foundation.

== History ==
The Global Burden of Disease Study began in 1990 as a single World Bank–commissioned study that quantified the health effects of more than 100 diseases and injuries for eight regions of the world, giving estimates of morbidity and mortality by age, sex, and region. It also introduced the disability-adjusted life year (DALY) as a new metric to quantify the burden of diseases, injuries, and risk factors, to aid comparisons. GBD 1990 was "institutionalized" at the World Health Organization (WHO) and the research was "conducted mainly by researchers at Harvard and WHO".

In 2000–2002, the 1990 study was updated by WHO to include a more extensive analysis using a framework known as comparative risk factor assessment.

The WHO estimates were again updated for 2004 in The global burden of disease: 2004 update (published in 2008) and in Global health risks (published in 2009).

Official DALY estimates had not been updated by WHO since 2004 until the Global Burden of Diseases, Injuries, and Risk Factors Study 2010 (GBD 2010), also known as the Global Burden of Disease Study 2010, was published in December 2012. The work quantified the burdens of 291 major causes of death and disability and 67 risk factors disaggregated by 21 geographic regions and various age–sex groups. GBD 2010 had the Institute for Health Metrics and Evaluation as its coordinating center, but was a collaboration between several institutions including WHO and the Harvard School of Public Health. The work was funded by the Gates Foundation. The GBD 2010 estimates contributed to WHO's own estimates published in 2013, although WHO did not acknowledge the GBD 2010 estimates.

The Global Burden of Disease Study 2013 (GBD 2013) was published in 2014. The first installment, "Smoking Prevalence and Cigarette Consumption in 187 Countries, 1980–2012", was published in the Journal of the American Medical Association in January, and further installments were published throughout the year. IHME continued to act as the coordinating center for the work.

The Global Burden of Disease Study 2017 (GBD 2017) was published in October 2018. The work was still coordinated at IHME. The life of Christopher Murray and the Global Burden of Disease Study is told in Epic Measures: One Doctor. Seven Billion Patients by Jeremey N. Smith.

GBD 2019 was published in The Lancet in October 2020.

GBD 2021 was published in The Lancet in February to May 2024, including an impact assessment of the COVID-19 pandemic as well as projections by 2050. Fact sheets are provided for all topics. The estimates are also available through an online tool and data files, for which a registration is required.

GBD 2023 was published in The Lancet in October 2025.

=== Growth ===
The following table summarizes GBD's growth over the years.

Report		Collaborators		Coverage in report		Sources
GBD	Publication year	Researchers	Countries	Countries	Causes of death	Sources
1990	1993					
2010	2012	488	50	187	235	
2013	2014	more than 1,000	106	188	240	
2015	2016	1,870	127	195	249	
2017	2018					
2019	2020	Over 5,000	152	204		
2021	2024	Over 12,000	over 160	204	288	
2023	2025	Over 18,000	over 160	204	292	

== Aims ==
The GBD has three specific aims:

1. To systematically incorporate information on non-fatal outcomes into the assessment of the health status (using a time-based measure of healthy years of life lost due either to premature mortality or to years lived with a disability, weighted by the severity of that disability)
2. To ensure that all estimates and projections were derived on the basis of objective epidemiological and demographic methods, which were not influenced by advocates.
3. To measure the burden of disease using a metric that could also be used to assess the cost-effectiveness of interventions. The metric chosen was the DALY (Disability Adjusted Life Years).

The burden of disease can be viewed as the gap between current health status and an ideal situation in which everyone lives into old age free of disease and disability. Causes of the gap are premature mortality, disability and exposure to certain risk factors that contribute to illness.

== Results ==
Diet-related cardiovascular disease deaths in the Global Burden of Disease study in the WHO European Region from 1990 to 2019

The 2013 report showed that global life expectancy for both sexes increased from 65.3 years in 1990, to 71.5 years in 2013, while the number of deaths increased from 47.5 million to 54.9 million over the same interval. Progress varied widely across demographic and national groups. Reductions in age-standardised death rates for cardiovascular diseases and cancers in high-income regions, and reductions in child deaths from diarrhoea, lower respiratory infections and neonatal causes in low-income regions drove the changes. HIV/AIDS reduced life expectancy in southern sub-Saharan Africa.

For most communicable causes of death both numbers of deaths and age-standardised death rates fell, while for most non-communicable causes, demographic shifts increased numbers of deaths but decreased age-standardised death rates.

Global deaths from injury increased by 10.7%, from 4.3 million deaths in 1990 to 4.8 million in 2013; but age-standardised rates declined over the same period by 21%. For some causes of more than 100,000 deaths per year in 2013, age-standardised death rates increased between 1990 and 2013, including HIV/AIDS, pancreatic cancer, atrial fibrillation and flutter, drug use disorders, diabetes, chronic kidney disease and sickle-cell anaemias. Diarrhoeal diseases, lower respiratory infections, neonatal causes and malaria remain in the top five causes of death in children younger than 5 years. The most important pathogens are rotavirus for diarrhoea and pneumococcus for lower respiratory infections.

GBD 2015 found that for the first time, annual deaths from measles had fallen below 100,000 in 2013 and 2015. It also found that the global annual rate of new HIV infections has largely stayed the same during the past 10 years.

GBD 2015 also introduced the Socio-demographic Index (SDI) as a measure of a location's socio-demographic development that takes into account average income per person, educational attainment, and total fertility rate.

A 2025 updated systematic analysis of the Global Burden of Disease study in the WHO European Region from 1990 to 2019 found that most diet-related cardiovascular disease deaths were caused by a diet low in whole grains and that overall 80.3% of deaths were due to ischaemic heart disease.

== Reception ==
The results of the Global Burden of Disease Study have been cited by The New York Times, The Washington Post, Vox, and The Atlantic.

The World Health Organization did not acknowledge the GBD 2010 estimates.

== Publications ==
The following is a table of GBD publications as of October 2020.

"GBD 2010" proper means the paper was published as part of the original triple issue in The Lancet.

Title	Corresponding GBD	Publication date	Type	Venue
"Latest global disease estimates reveal perfect storm of rising chronic diseases and public health failures fuelling COVID-19 pandemic"	2019	October 2020		Lancet
"The burden of mental disorders in the Eastern Mediterranean Region, 1990–2013"	2013	January 2017		PLOS ONE
"Global burden of hypertension and systolic blood pressure of at least 110 to 115 mmHg, 1990–2015"	2015	January 2017		JAMA
"The Global Burden of Disease study and the preventable burden of NCD"	None (cites both 2010 and 2013)	December 2016		Global Heart
"Global, regional, and national cancer incidence, mortality, years of life lost, years lived with disability, and disability-adjusted life years for 32 cancer groups, 1990 to 2015: a systematic analysis for the Global Burden of Disease study"	2015	December 2016		JAMA Oncology
"A subnational analysis of mortality and prevalence of COPD in China from 1990 to 2013"	2013	December 2016		Chest
"Global, regional, and national comparative risk assessment of 79 behavioural, environmental and occupational, and metabolic risks or clusters of risks, 1990–2015: a systematic analysis for the Global Burden of Disease Study 2015"	2015	October 2016	GBD 2015 proper	The Lancet
"Global, regional, and national disability-adjusted life-years (DALYs) for 315 diseases and injuries and healthy life expectancy (HALE), 1990–2015: a systematic analysis for the Global Burden of Disease Study 2015"	2015	October 2016	GBD 2015 proper	The Lancet
"Global, regional, and national levels of maternal mortality, 1990–2015: a systematic analysis for the Global Burden of Disease Study 2015"	2015	October 2016	GBD 2015 proper	The Lancet
"Global, regional, and national life expectancy, all-cause mortality, and cause-specific mortality for 249 causes of death, 1980–2015: a systematic analysis for the Global Burden of Disease Study 2015"	2015	October 2016	GBD 2015 proper	The Lancet
"Global, regional, and national incidence, prevalence, and years lived with disability for 310 diseases and injuries, 1990–2015: a systematic analysis for the Global Burden of Disease Study 2015"	2015	October 2016	GBD 2015 proper	The Lancet
"Global, regional, national, and selected subnational levels of stillbirths, neonatal, infant, and under-5 mortality, 1980–2015: a systematic analysis for the Global Burden of Disease Study 2015"	2015	October 2016	GBD 2015 proper	The Lancet
"Dissonant health transition in the states of Mexico, 1990–2013: a systematic analysis for the Global Burden of Disease Study 2013"	2013	October 2016		The Lancet
"Measuring the health-related Sustainable Development Goals in 188 countries: a baseline analysis from the Global Burden of Disease study 2015"	2015	September 2016		The Lancet
"Estimating the burden of disease attributable to injecting drug use as a risk factor for HIV, hepatitis C, and hepatitis B: findings from the Global Burden of Disease Study 2013"	2013	September 2016		The Lancet Infectious Diseases
"Health in times of uncertainty in the Eastern Mediterranean region, 1990–2013: a systematic analysis for the Global Burden of Disease Study 2013"	2013	August 2016		The Lancet Global Health
"Physical activity and risk of breast cancer, colon cancer, diabetes, ischemic heart disease, and ischemic stroke events: systematic review and dose-response meta-analysis for the Global Burden of Disease Study 2013"	2013	August 2016		The BMJ
"Prevention of stroke: a strategic global imperative"	2013	July 2016		Nature Reviews Neurology
"Estimates of global, regional, and national incidence, prevalence, and mortality of HIV, 1980–2015: the Global Burden of Disease Study 2015"	2015	July 2016		The Lancet HIV
"The global burden of viral hepatitis from 1990 to 2013: findings from the Global Burden of Disease Study 2013"	2013	July 2016		The Lancet
"Global burden of stroke and risk factors in 188 countries, during 1990–2013: a systematic analysis for the Global Burden of Disease Study 2013"	2013	June 2016		The Lancet Neurology
"The burden of mental, neurological, and substance use disorders in China and India: a systematic analysis of community representative epidemiological studies"	2013	May 2016		The Lancet
"The global economic burden of dengue: a systematic analysis"	2013	April 2016		The Lancet Infectious Diseases
"The burden of cancer in Mexico, 1990–2013"	2013	March 2016		Salud Publica de Mexico
"Global burden of cutaneous leishmaniasis: a cross-sectional analysis from the Global Burden of Disease study 2013"	2013	February 2016		The Lancet Infectious Diseases
"The global burden of dengue: an analysis from the Global Burden of Disease study 2013"	2013	February 2016		The Lancet Infectious Diseases
"Global and national burden of diseases and injuries among children and adolescents between 1990 and 2013: Findings from the Global Burden of Disease 2013 study"	2013	January 2016		JAMA Pediatrics
"Stroke prevalence, mortality and disability-adjusted life years in children and youth aged 0–19 years: Data from the global and regional burden of stroke 2013"	2013	January 2016		Neuroepidemiology
"The global burden of injury: incidence, mortality, disability-adjusted life years and time trends from the Global Burden of Disease study 2013"	2013	December 2015		Injury Prevention
"Ambient air pollution exposure estimation for the Global Burden of Disease 2013"	2013	November 2015		Environmental Science & Technology
"Estimating distributions of health state severity for the Global Burden of Disease study"	2013	November 2015		Population Health Metrics
"Stroke prevalence, mortality and disability-adjusted life years in adults aged 20–64 years in 1990–2013: Data from the Global Burden of Disease 2013 study"	2013	October 2015		Neuroepidemiology
"Update on the global burden of ischemic and hemorrhagic stroke in 1990–2013: the GBD 2013 study"	2013	October 2015		Neuroepidemiology
"Atlas of the global burden of stroke (1990–2013): The GBD 2013 Study"	2013	October 2015		Neuroepidemiology
"Sex differences in stroke incidence, prevalence, mortality and disability-adjusted life years: Results from the Global Burden of Disease study 2013"	2013	October 2015		Neuroepidemiology
"Global and regional patterns in cardiovascular mortality from 1990 to 2013"	2013	October 2015		Circulation
"Cause-specific mortality for 240 causes in China during 1990–2013: a systematic subnational analysis for the Global Burden of Disease Study 2013"	2013	October 2015		The Lancet
"Under-5 mortality in 2,851 Chinese counties, 1996–2012: a subnational assessment of achieving MDG 4 goals in China"	None (cites both 2010 and 2013)	October 2015		The Lancet
"Disability weights for the Global Burden of Disease 2013 study"	2013	October 2015		The Lancet
"Methods for estimating the global burden of cerebrovascular diseases"	2013	October 2015		Neuroepidemiology
"Estimates of global and regional premature cardiovascular mortality in 2025"	2013	September 2015		Circulation
"Changes in health in England, with analysis by English regions and areas of deprivation, 1990–2013: a systematic analysis for the Global Burden of Disease Study 2013"	2013	September 2015		The Lancet
"Global, regional, and national comparative risk assessment of 79 behavioral, environmental and occupational, and metabolic risks or clusters of risks in 188 countries, 1990–2013: a systematic analysis for the Global Burden of Disease Study 2013"	2013	September 2015		The Lancet
"Benchmarking health system performance across states in Nigeria: a systematic analysis of levels and trends in key maternal and child health interventions and outcomes, 2000–2013"	2013	September 2015		BMC Medicine
"Global, regional, and national disability-adjusted life years (DALYs) for 306 diseases and injuries and healthy life expectancy (HALE) for 188 countries, 1990–2013: quantifying the epidemiological transition"	2013	August 2015		The Lancet
"Maintenance dialysis throughout the world in years 1990 and 2010"	2010	July 2015		JASN
"Ischemic heart disease worldwide, 1990 to 2013"	2013	July 2015		Circulation: Cardiovascular Quality and Outcomes
"Global, regional, and national incidence, prevalence, and years lived with disability for 301 acute and chronic diseases and injuries in 188 countries, 1990–2013: a systematic analysis for the Global Burden of Disease Study 2013"	2013	June 2015		The Lancet
"The Global Burden of Cancer 2013"	2013	May 2015		JAMA Oncology
"Demographic and epidemiologic drivers of global cardiovascular mortality"	2013	April 2015		The New England Journal of Medicine
"Mortality from cardiovascular diseases in sub-Saharan Africa, 1990–2013: a systematic analysis of data from the Global Burden of Disease study 2013: cardiovascular topic"	2013	April 2015		Cardiovascular Journal Africa
"Global burden of untreated caries: a systematic review and metaregression"	2010	March 2015		Journal of Dental Research
"Deconstructing the differences: a comparison of GBD 2010 and CHERG's approach to estimating the mortality burden of diarrhea, pneumonia, and their etiologies"	2010	January 2015		BMC Infectious Diseases
"Global, regional, and national age–sex specific all-cause and cause-specific mortality for 240 causes of death, 1990–2013: a systematic analysis for the Global Burden of Disease Study 2013"	2013	December 2014		The Lancet
"The burden of disease in Spain: results from the Global Burden of Disease study 2010"	2010	December 2014		BioMed Central
"Global burden of severe periodontitis in 1990–2010: a systematic review and meta-regression"	2010	September 2014		Journal of Dental Research
"Liver cirrhosis mortality in 187 countries between 1980 and 2010: a systematic analysis"	2010	September 2014		BMC Medicine
"The Global Burden of Disease Study 2010: Interpretation and implications for the neglected tropical diseases"	2010	July 2014		PLOS Neglected Tropical Diseases
"Global, regional, and national incidence and mortality for HIV, tuberculosis, and malaria during 1990–2013: a systematic analysis for the Global Burden of Disease Study 2013"	2013	July 2014		The Lancet
"Burden of injuries avertable by a basic surgical package in low- and middle-income regions: a systematic analysis from the Global Burden of Disease 2010 Study"	2010	July 2014		World Journal of Surgery
"Comparing cutaneous research funded by the National Institute of Arthritis and Musculoskeletal and Skin Diseases with 2010 Global Burden of Disease results"	2010	July 2014		PLOS ONE
"Global, regional, and national prevalence of overweight and obesity in children and adults during 1980–2013: a systematic analysis for the Global Burden of Disease Study 2013"	2013	May 2014		The Lancet
"Population health and burden of disease profile of Iran among 20 countries in the region: from Afghanistan to Qatar and Lebanon"	2010	May 2014		Archives of Iranian Medicine
"Evaluating causes of death and morbidity in Iran, Global Burden of Diseases, Injuries, and Risk Factors Study 2010"	2010	May 2014		Archives of Iranian Medicine
"Health transition in Iran toward chronic diseases based on results of Global Burden of Disease 2010"	2010	May 2014		Archives of Iranian Medicine
"Global, regional, and national levels of neonatal, infant, and under-5 mortality during 1990–2013: a systematic analysis for the Global Burden of Disease Study 2013"	2013	May 2014		The Lancet
"Global, regional, and national levels and causes of maternal mortality during 1990–2013: a systematic analysis for the Global Burden of Disease Study 2013"	2013	May 2014		The Lancet
"Temporal trends in ischemic heart disease mortality in 21 world regions, 1980–2010: the Global Burden of Disease 2010 Study"	2010	February 2014		Circulation
"The global burden of ischemic heart disease in 1990 and 2010: the Global Burden of Disease 2010 Study"	2010	February 2014		Circulation
"The state of health in the Arab world, 1990–2010: an analysis of the burden of diseases, injuries, and risk factors"	2010	January 2014		The Lancet
"Smoking prevalence and cigarette consumption in 187 countries, 1980–2012"	2013	January 2014		Journal of the American Medical Association
"Global, regional and national sodium intakes in 1990 and 2010: a systematic analysis of 24 h urinary sodium excretion and dietary surveys worldwide"	2010	December 2013		BMJ Open
"The global burden of skin disease in 2010: an analysis of the prevalence and impact of skin conditions"	2010	November 2013		Journal of Investigative Dermatology
"Global burden of disease attributable to mental and substance use disorders: findings from the Global Burden of Disease Study 2010"	2010	November 2013		The Lancet
"Burden of depressive disorders by country, sex, age, and year: findings from the Global Burden of Disease Study 2010"	2010	November 2013		PLoS Medicine
"Global and regional burden of first-ever ischaemic and haemorrhagic stroke during 1990–2010: findings from the Global Burden of Disease Study 2010"	2010	October 2013		The Lancet
"A systematic analysis of global anemia burden from 1990 to 2010"	2010	October 2013		Blood
"Global burden of disease attributable to illicit drug use and dependence: findings from the Global Burden of Disease Study 2010"	2010	August 2013		The Lancet
"The burden of HIV: insights from the Global Burden of Disease Study 2010"	2010	August 2013		AIDS
"Measuring the Global Burden of Disease"	2010	August 2013		New England Journal of Medicine
"The state of US health, 1990–2010: burden of diseases, injuries, and risk factors"	2010	July 2013		Journal of the American Medical Association
"The global prevalence of intimate partner violence against women"	None (does not seem to cite any GBD publication)	June 2013		Science
"Rapid health transition in China, 1990–2010: findings from the Global Burden of Disease Study 2010"	2010	June 2013		The Lancet
"Global burden of oral conditions in 1990–2010: a systematic analysis"	2010	May 2013		Journal of Dental Research
"UK health performance: findings of the Global Burden of Disease Study 2010"	2010	March 2013		The Lancet
"Healthy life expectancy for 187 countries, 1990–2010: a systematic analysis for the Global Burden of Disease Study 2010"	2010	December 2012	GBD 2010 proper	The Lancet
"Common values in assessing health outcomes from disease and injury: disability weights measurement study for the Global Burden of Disease Study 2010"	2010	December 2012	GBD 2010 proper	The Lancet
"Disability-adjusted life years (DALYs) for 291 diseases and injuries in 21 regions, 1990–2010: a systematic analysis for the Global Burden of Disease Study 2010"	2010	December 2012	GBD 2010 proper	The Lancet
"Global and regional mortality from 235 causes of death for 20 age groups in 1990 and 2010: a systematic analysis for the Global Burden of Disease Study 2010"	2010	December 2012	GBD 2010 proper	The Lancet
"A comparative risk assessment of burden of disease and injury attributable to 67 risk factors and risk factor clusters in 21 regions, 1990–2010: a systematic analysis for the Global Burden of Disease Study 2010"	2010	December 2012	GBD 2010 proper	The Lancet
"Years lived with disability (YLDs) for 1,160 sequelae of 289 diseases and injuries, 1990–2010: a systematic analysis for the Global Burden of Disease Study 2010"	2010	December 2012	GBD 2010 proper	The Lancet
"Age-specific and sex-specific mortality in 187 countries, 1970–2010: a systematic analysis for the Global Burden of Disease Study 2010"	2010	December 2012	GBD 2010 proper	The Lancet
"Global malaria mortality between 1980 and 2010: a systematic analysis"	2010?	February 2012		The Lancet
"National, regional, and global trends in systolic blood pressure since 1980: systematic analysis of health examination surveys and epidemiological studies with 786 country-years and 5.4 million participants"	None	February 2011		The Lancet
"The burden of injuries in Iranian children in 2005"	None	March 2010		Population Health Metrics
The Global Epidemiology of Infectious Diseases (GBD 1990 volume 4)	1990	2004		World Health Organization
Health Dimensions of Sex and Reproduction: The Global Burden of Sexually Transmitted Diseases, HIV, Maternal Conditions, Perinatal Disorders, and Congenital Anomalies (GBD 1990 volume 3)	1990	1998		Harvard School of Public Health
Global Health Statistics: A Compendium of Incidence, Prevalence and Mortality Estimates for Over 200 Conditions (GBD 1990 volume 2)	1990	1996		Harvard School of Public Health
Global Burden of Disease: A comprehensive assessment of mortality and disability from diseases, injuries, and risk factors in 1990 and projected to 2020 (GBD 1990 volume 1)	1990	1996		World Health Organization

== See also ==
- Alan Lopez
- Dan Wikler
- Disease Control Priorities Project
- Dean Jamison
- Health policy
- Pharmacoeconomics
- Priority-setting in global health
