= Frank Rose =

Frank Rose may refer to:

- Frank Rose (politician) (1857–1928), British MP for Aberdeen North
- Frank Atcherley Rose (1873–1935), British specialist in diseases of the throat
- Frank Rose (Royal Navy officer) (1878–1955), British Royal Navy Vice Admiral
- Frank Rose (chemist) (1909–1988), British chemist
- Frank Rose (academic) (1920–1991), American president of the University of Alabama
- Frank Clifford Rose (1926–2012), British neurologist
- Frank A. Rose, American government official

== See also ==
- Frank LaRose (born 1979), American politician
- Francis Rose (1921–2006), botanist and conservationist
- Francis Cyril Rose (1909–1979), English painter
- Francis Rose (Jamaica), plantation owner in Jamaica
- Rose Frank (1864–1954), New Zealand photographer
- Rose Frank (artist) (1912–?), artist of the Nez Perce tribe
