= Atcherley =

Atcherley is a surname. Notable people with the surname include:

- David Atcherley (1904–1952), British pilot
- Frank Atcherley Rose (1873–1935), British surgeon
- Harold Atcherley (1918–2017), British businessman
- Mary Haʻaheo Atcherley (1874–1933), Hawaiian linguist and politician
- Richard Atcherley (1904–1970), British pilot
