= Edna Paisano =

Native American demographer and statistician

Edna Lee Paisano
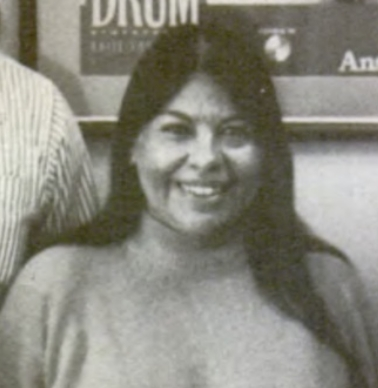
- Edna Paisano c. 1990
- Born: January 1, 1948; Sweetwater, Idaho
- Died: September 3, 2014 (aged 66); Lewiston, Idaho
- Education: Boise College; University of Washington
- Known for: Increasing counting of First Nations people in the US Census
- Awards: Department of Commerce Silver Medal
- Scientific career
- Fields: Social work; Sociology; Statistics; Demography; Native American studies
- Workplaces: United States Census Bureau

Edna Lee Paisano (January 1, 1948 – September 3, 2014) was a Nez Perce and Laguna Pueblo demographer and statistician. She worked to improve the representation of Indigenous communities in the United States census. She advocated for accurate representation of the demography of the United States, arguing that without this minority populations would not receive proportional resources. Paisano put this into practice as the first Native American full time employee of the United States Census Bureau. She has been credited with substantially increasing the accuracy of the American Indian and Alaska Native census category between the 1980 census and the 1990 census.

== Early life and education ==
Paisano was born on the Nez Perce Reservation in Sweetwater, Idaho on January 1, 1948. She was one of four children, including an older sister who died in early adulthood. Her mother was active in education efforts on the Reservation, and when Edna Paisano was a child, her mother was awarded the Leo Reano Memorial Award from the National Educational Association for that work.

Paisano attended school in Lapwai, Idaho, and spent two years at Boise College. She then switched to the University of Washington. Paisano spent most of her junior year in hospital with rheumatoid arthritis. She graduated with a bachelor's degree in 1971. She obtained a master's degree at the University of Washington in social work in 1973, and as part of her graduate work she studied statistics. Paisano had loved mathematics since childhood.

== Student activism ==
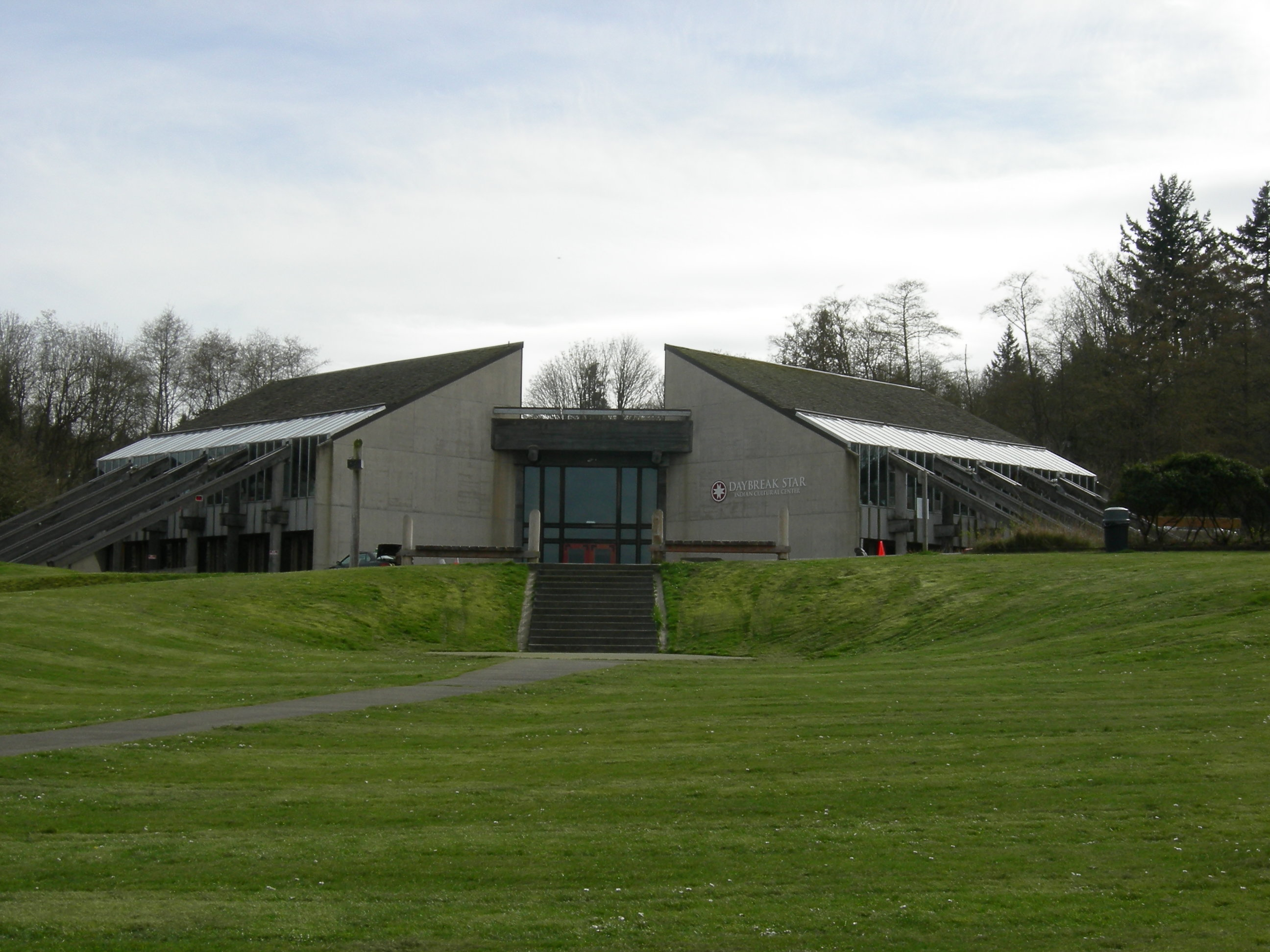
Daybreak Star Cultural Center

During her time at the University of Washington, she worked as part of a successful effort to found an American Indian cultural center in Fort Lawton.

Fort Lawton had not been ceded to the United States government, and when the military base was downsized, a movement of Seattle Indians sought to acquire land in accordance with treaty provisions. During their occupation of the land in 1970, dozens were arrested and briefly imprisoned, including Paisano. The building of the Daybreak Star Cultural Center was completed in 1977.

== Career ==
Paisano's first job in the federal government was working on the federal Head Start program, with Indian tribes nationally. In June 1976, Paisano moved to the United States Census Bureau, becoming the first Native American to work there fulltime. She worked in particular on issues related to the American Indian and Alaska Native census category. There Paisano studied why Native American communities were being dramatically under-counted in the United States census, which caused them to receive disproportionately few government resources and services. Upon arriving at the census bureau, she described realizing "how important it is for American Indians to know demography, computer programming and statistics: first, because there are very few American Indians in these fields; and second, because, the government is always trying to assess things".

In her work at the Census Bureau, Paisano identified a systematic undercount of regions where there were very large proportions of Native Americans. She attempted to rectify the imbalance using her training in statistics and computer programming, combined with extensive liaison with communities, and a large public information campaign aimed at increasing the number of Native Americans who filled out the census. In particular, she developed a questionnaire to estimate the number of Native Americans who may not have been counted in the 1980 census, and she used her training in statistics to suggest improvements to how the US census attempted to count Native communities. Her efforts led to more accurate counts of Native Americans in the United States Census, which was one of the factors likely to have contributed to an increase in the number of people counted in the American Indian and Alaska Native category in the 1990 census compared to the 1980 census.

In addition to her work with the Racial Statistics Branch in the Population Division of the Census Bureau, Paisano also participated in the Interagency Task Force on American Indian Women. After 20 years at the Census Bureau, Paisano took a job with the Environmental Protection Agency. After a year, she began serving as principal statistician of the Indian Health Service within the Department of Health and Human Services.

Paisano retired from the federal government in 2011 and returned to Sweetwater. She died on September 3, 2014, in Lewiston, Idaho.

== Selected awards ==
- Bronze Medal Award for Superior Federal Service, U.S. Department of Commerce, 1987
- Department of Commerce Silver Medal, 1994
- Distinguished Alumnus Award, University of Washington, 2003

== Selected works ==
- We the First Americans, US Census Bureau report, 1993
- We the Americans: Pacific Islanders, US Census Bureau report, 1993
- We the American-Asians, US Census Bureau report, 1993
