= Joshua Salomon =

American infectious disease researcher

- Education: Harvard University
- Scientific career
- Fields: Infectious disease Public health
- Institutions: Stanford School of Medicine
- Thesis: Empirical approaches to modeling HIV and hepatitis C (2001)
- Doctoral advisor: Christopher J. L. Murray

Joshua A. Salomon is Professor of Health Policy at the Stanford University School of Medicine, where he is also director of the Prevention Policy Modeling Lab. He previously served as Professor of Global Health at the Harvard T.H. Chan School of Public Health.
