= Nicholas Jakubovics =

British dental researcher

- Born: 1973 (age 52–53)
- Education: Cambridge University (BSc 1994); Warwick University (PhD 1998)
- Known for: microbial biofilms
- Scientific career
- Fields: microbiology
- Workplaces: Newcastle University; NIDCR; Bristol University
- Thesis: Biofilms in the potable water distribution network (1998)
- Doctoral advisor: Crawford S. Dow

Nicholas Stephen Jakubovics (born 1973) is a British dental researcher and academic who is a professor of oral microbiology at the School of Dental Sciences, Newcastle University. He is editor-in-chief of the Journal of Dental Research. His research concentrates on microbial adhesion, colonisation and cell-cell interactions, primarily in dental plaque.

== Career ==
Jakubovics studied biochemistry at Girton College, Cambridge before completing a doctorate at Warwick University under the supervision of Crawford S. Dow. He subsequently worked with Howard Jenkinson at Bristol Dental School investigating the adhesion, colonisation and sensing mechanisms of oral streptococci. In 2004, Jakubovics obtained a NIH Post-Doctoral Fellowship to work with Paul Kolenbrander at the National Institute for Dental and Craniofacial Research in Bethesda, Maryland, on cell-cell interactions in oral biofilms. He joined Newcastle Dental School as lecturer in Oral Microbiology in 2007 and was promoted to Professor in 2022. His research employs techniques from molecular genetics to understand how oral biofilms form and to investigate the impact of different treatments. Jakubovics co-authored a 2019 paper finding that early-stage bacterial growth was slowed by the use of rose petal-like hierarchical surfaces. He also studies biofilms elsewhere in the human body, including prosthetic joint, middle ear, and sinus infections.

Jakubovics, Alexander H. Rickard, Derek Samarian, and Ethan Kolderman jointly hold a patent for the use of L-arginine to remove dental plaque.

Jakubovics has been editor-in-chief of the Journal of Dental Research since April 2020.

== Personal life ==
Jakubovics has represented Bristol in the Four Nations Chess League. He has two children and lives in Northumberland.
