= Harvard Center for Population and Development Studies =

- Established: 1964
- Parent institution: Harvard University
- Affiliations: Harvard T.H. Chan School of Public Health
- Director: Rita Hamad, MD, PhD
- Location: Cambridge, Massachusetts, United States of America
- Website: popcenter.harvard.edu

The Harvard Center for Population and Development Studies (HCPDS) is an interfaculty initiative at Harvard University that is closely affiliated with the Harvard T.H. Chan School of Public Health.

The Center houses post-doctoral programs, including the David E. Bell Fellowship, the Mortimer Spiegelman Postdoctoral Fellowship in Demographic Studies, and previously offered the Sloan Fellowship on Aging and Work, and the Robert Wood Johnson Foundation Health & Society Scholars program.

== History ==
The Harvard Center for Population and Development Studies was founded in 1964 by the Harvard School of Public Health (now the Harvard T.H. Chan School of Public Health) under the direction of Dean Jack Snyder and director Roger Revelle with a mandate to address issues of population control. Over the years, the Center has addressed the following themes:

- 1960s: Population growth, water resources, reproductive biology
- 1970s: Population and resources; migration
- 1980s: Health transitions in developing countries
- 1990s: Reproductive health, common security, and the global burden of disease
- Early 2000s: Well-being of the global poor; health in Africa
- 2008-current: Social and environmental determinants of population health; immigration; aging societies; health effects of workplace policies, youth, families and social mobility, and population dynamics of climate change.

=== 50th anniversary and symposium ===
As a celebration of its 50th anniversary, the Center for Population and Development Studies honored several individuals who played important roles in the development of the Center, including:

- Lincoln Chen, former director of the Center for Population and Development Studies from 1988–1996 and Taro Takemi Professor of International Health at the Harvard T.H. Chan School of Public Health. He was honored for his work as former Director of the Center, which included engaging the Center more directly in international policy research, as well as his work in the publication of several landmark global population books.
- Mary Paci, daughter of former HCPDS Director Roger Revelle. She was honored for her work as a long-term member of the advisory committee of the Center and continued support of funding initiatives at the Harvard TH. Chan School of Public Health.
- Sissela Bok, philosopher, ethicist, writer, and former Senior Visiting Fellow at the Center for Population and Development Studies. She was honored for her work at the Center, including research that contributed to the field of ethics and population study, as well as the convening workshops and seminar series.

In addition, the Center hosted a 50th anniversary symposium entitled "Reimagining Societies in the Face of Demographic Change," which concerned recent demographic challenges faced by communities in the 21st century, including a rapidly aging global population, women's health and declining fertility, and initiatives the Center for Population and Development Studies is pursuing to help address these challenges.

== Leadership ==
Rita Hamad, MD, PhD
- Title: Professor of Social Epidemiology and Public Policy at Harvard T.H. Chan School of Public Health

Academic background
- Education: MD, University of California San Francisco; PhD, Epidemiology, Stanford University
- Website: https://popcenter.harvard.edu/blog/directory/rita-hamad-md-phd/

Rita Hamad is professor of social epidemiology and public policy at Harvard T.H. Chan School of Public Health and the director of the School’s Social Policies for Health Equity Research Center. As a social epidemiologist, her research focuses on the pathways linking social factors like poverty and education with racial and socioeconomic disparities in health across the life course. In particular, she studies the health effects of social and economic policies using interdisciplinary quasi-experimental methods to generate actionable evidence to inform policymaking. She is the co-chair of the Communications Committee of the Interdisciplinary Association for Population Health Science and serves as an associate editor for the journal Health Affairs Scholar. In 2020-2022, she was the James C. Puffer American Board of Family Medicine / National Academy of Medicine Fellow. She has provided consultation to state and federal legislators on the design of poverty alleviation policies. Dr. Hamad mentors trainees at all levels in population health and health equity research, and lectures in several courses about the effects of social policies on health inequities. She saw patients as a family physician for 10 years in safety net clinics throughout the San Francisco Bay Area, although she is no longer a practicing doctor.

=== Previous directors ===
Director	Term	Achievements
Roger Revelle	1964-1976	A trained oceanographer and natural scientist, he studied interactions between people and environments. He co-founded the University of San Diego, and directed the Scripps Institution of Oceanography
William Alonso	1976-1978	A demographer and sociologist, his research focused on demographic changes, in particular in very urbanized areas. He developed a mathematical model, connecting migration and the evolution of the distribution of the population.
Nathan Keyfitz	1978-1980	As a statistician and sociologist, he was a pioneer of mathematical demography. His later research focused on environmental and food security, sustainable development, the ethics of consumption, climate change, and poverty.
David E. Bell	1981-1988	An economist, he served under President Truman and then as director of the U.S. Bureau of Budget and USAID under President Kennedy. His work focused on the intersection of health, population, and economic development.
Lincoln Chen	1988-1996	A medical doctor, he ushered in a new era at the Center by assertively engaging in a number of international policy research topics such as health equity, health transitions, reproductive health and rights, and global burden of disease.
Michael R. Reich	2001-2005	An international health policy expert, his research focused on economic, political and ethical issues in population policies and reproductive health, access to medicines in the developing world, and the neglected health problems of the global poor.
Christopher J.L. Murray	2005-2007	A physician and health economist, his work, including the inception of the Global Burden of Disease model, led to the development of new methods and empirical studies that strengthened the basis for population health measurement.
Lisa F. Berkman	2007-2025	Social epidemiologist Lisa Berkman is the Thomas D. Cabot Professor of Public Policy and Epidemiology at Harvard T.H. Chan School of Public Health (formerly the Harvard School of Public Health). She was chair of the School’s Department of Society, Human Development and Health from 1995 to 2008. She is noted for identifying the effects of social networks on mortality risks that helped define the field of social epidemiology in the late 1970s. Berkman also broadened the field with her investigations of how social conditions related to inequality, race, ethnicity, and social isolation influence health and aging.[1]

== Current work ==
Over the past 60 years, the Harvard Center for Population and Development Studies has expanded its focus on overpopulation to examine relevant questions involving demographic shifts, resources, health, and the environment. The Center engages over 75 faculty members from multiple disciplines in order to facilitate interdisciplinary collaboration. There are four main research focal areas:

- Aging Societies
- Youth, Families, and Social Mobility
- Work, Policy, and Well-Being
- Population Dynamics of Climate Change

=== Major projects ===
Current major projects of the Center include:

- Health and Aging in Africa: A Longitudinal Study of an INDEPTH Community in South Africa (HAALSI): This study follows and tests a cohort of Agincourt residents for HIV infection and cardiometabolic disease risk factors, then integrates that data with mortality data to study the drivers and consequences of HIV and non-communicable diseases in an aging population in Agincourt, South Africa.
- Cognitive Function, Alzheimer’s Disease and Related Disorders in the HAALSI Cohort: This project furthers research conducted by the HAALSI team on the social and biological risk factors for Alzheimer’s disease & related dementias (ADRD) in an aging population in rural South Africa. The HAALSI Dementia Study following a cohort of 600 participants through two additional waves of dementia diagnostic evaluation, including an enriched cognitive battery, informant interviews, and neurological examinations.
- India Policy Insights: The goal of this project (also referred to as Burden of Disease and Deprivation in India across Micro and Macro Public Policy Units) is to improve precision public policy, public financing, and governance in India related to population health and development. The researchers aim to harness key population health and development data geocoded to multiple micro and macro public policy units, develop an intelligent public data and analytics platform to disseminate the findings in an interactive way, and engage multiple stakeholders in order to foster evidence-based policy discussion, formulation, and action.
- Work and Well-Being Initiative: This initiative is a multi-disciplinary, broad-based research and policy initiative designed to develop and implement evidence-based workplace change for worker well-being. The goal of the initiative is to provide a deeper understanding of worker well-being, and to identify the workplace policies and practices that enhance the lives of workers in the workplace and throughout their lives. The initiative's website features an Employer Toolkit that can be used to help employers create workplace conditions which foster the health and well-being of all workers in an inclusive manner.

=== Postdoctoral fellowships ===
- David E. Bell Fellowship: Named in honor of the late David E. Bell, former Harvard School of Public Health professor and former director of the Harvard Center for Population and Development Studies. the Bell Fellowship Program provides training for researchers and practitioners in the field of population and development. Bell Fellows examine a broad range of critical issues in the field of population and development studies from multidisciplinary perspectives.
- The Mortimer Spiegelman Postdoctoral Fellowship in Demographic Studies is named after the actuary, biostatistician, and demographer Mortimer Spiegelman (1901–1969) who made exceptional contributions to public health. Spiegelman Fellows examine a broad range of critical issues in the field of population and development studies from multidisciplinary perspectives.
- The overarching goal of this project (also referred to as Burden of Disease and Deprivation in India across Micro and Macro Public Policy Units) is to improve precision public policy, public financing, and governance in India related to population health and development. The researchers aim to harness key population health and development data geocoded to multiple micro and macro public policy units, develop an intelligent public data and analytics platform to disseminate the findings in an interactive way, and engage multiple stakeholders in order to foster evidence-based policy discussion, formulation, and action.
