= Rose Frank (artist) =

Native American artist

- Born: April 6, 1912; Sweetwater, Idaho
- Died: January 19, 1999 (aged 86)
- Citizenship: Native American: Nez Percé
- Known for: Cornhusk weaving

Rose Josephine Corbett (née Compo; April 6, 1912 – January 19, 1999), later Rose Josephine Frank, was a Native American artist of the Nez Perce Tribe, known for her cornhusk weaving. Frank used her art as a way to preserve her tribe's craft, traditions, and rituals by creating artwork and instructing others.

== Personal life and career ==
Frank was born in 1912, in Sweetwater, Idaho into the Nez Perce Tribe, to Frank Compo and Martha Samuels Compo. She had an older sister named Rachel, younger sisters Annie and Louise, and a younger brother named Titus. She had another younger brother who was stillborn in 1919. Her father died in 1919, and her mother died in 1920 of tuberculosis. When she was six years old, Frank became an orphan and was taken to the St. Joseph Mission at Slickpoo.

During World War II, she worked in the shipyards of Portland, Oregon and after the war, returned to the reservation at Lapwai. Frank married farmer Austin Corbett in 1934 in Asotin, Washington. She lived as a housewife for the majority of her life until she took a class with Ida Blackeagle, who is credited as the impetus for Frank becoming a professional artist. Blackeagle was an instructor at Lewis-Clark State College in Lewiston, Idaho and was teaching a textile arts class that Frank chose to attend. Some sources have stated that the class was held at the nearby Lapwai High School as opposed to the college campus.

Blackeagle found Frank's work to be well-executed and suggested that she sell her cornhusk bags. Frank lacked confidence in her work and was astonished to discover that not only did her bags sell, but that one sold for $25. When asked about her art, Frank stated that she believed that her past experience with crocheting contributed to her successes with cornhusk weaving.

She continued to practice her weaving for more than 40 years, during which time she created hundreds of projects. Frank reported spending six hours a day on her projects, as a single stitch on a cornhusk bag could take one hour to produce, and would proudly claim that she never repeated her designs. She followed by stating that on average, it took four weeks to produce one bag if she worked approximately six to seven hours each day.

Frank mainly focused on traditional, geometric Nez Percé patterns such as diamonds, but would also produce floral patterns as requested by a customer. She later taught others the art of cornhusk weaving to ensure that the traditional techniques were passed down to the next generation. Frank stated that she praised every piece of work her students created, as this would encourage them to apply consistent effort and potentially lead to improve their work.

She changed her surname to Frank in the 1970s. She died in 1999.

== Artwork styles ==
Frank used twined cornhusk to create bags and other weavings. She would also incorporate other materials such as acrylic yarn or dyed twine for added color. Frank would use traditional Nez Perce geometric designs, which she created by weaving yarn and cornhusk around the weft as it crossed the warp. Her bags were capable of holding items as opposed to being only for display and her work was valued "not only for her meticulous craftsmanship, but also for her equally tenacious maintenance of traditional aesthetic principles."

Colors used by Frank could include pale yellow, black, blue, pink, purple, red, and green.

== Collections and exhibitions ==
Frank's artwork has been displayed in multiple exhibitions and permanent collections in locations such as the Nez Percé National Historical Park Museum and the Smithsonian's Modern American Indian collection. Her artwork can also be found in the collections of the National Endowment for the Arts.

== Awards and honors ==
- 1991: Frank received a National Heritage Fellowship presented by the National Endowment for the Arts. Frank traveled to Washington D.C. to accept her $5,000 award alongside fifteen other artists who had also won this award. There were a total of 209 people nominated for this award. This award is given to show one's lifetime achievement in folk or traditional arts.
- 1986: received the Governor's Folk Award by a former governor of Idaho, John V. Evans.

== See also ==
- Native American women in the arts
