= Alan Lopez =

Australian global and public health scholar and epidemiologist

Alan D. Lopez AC FAHMS
- Known for: Epidemiology of tobacco
- Awards: John Dirks Canada Gairdner Global Health Award (2018)
- Scientific career
- Fields: Public health; epidemiology
- Workplaces: University of Melbourne; World Health Organization; University of Queensland

Alan Donald Lopez (born 1951) is an Australian global and public health scholar and epidemiologist who focuses on the measurement of population health and the global descriptive epidemiologist of tobacco.

He was a Melbourne Laureate Professor and the Rowden-White Chair of Global Health and Burden of Disease Measurement at The University of Melbourne. He is also the Director of the Global Burden of Disease Group in the Melbourne School of Population and Global Health and a member of the Disease Control Priorities Project.

== Career ==
Prior to working at the University of Melbourne, Lopez worked at the World Health Organization (WHO) in Geneva for 22 years. He held a series of technical and senior managerial posts including Chief epidemiologist in WHO's Tobacco Control Program (1992–95), Manager of WHO's Program on Substance Abuse (1996–98), Director of the Epidemiology and Burden of Disease Unit (1999–2001) and Senior Science Advisor to the Director-General (2002). On leaving the World Health Organization he was appointed as the Head of the School of Population Health at the University of Queensland from 2003-2012.

Lopez is a widely cited author with over 75,000 citations to his work in health and medical research. Most notably, he is the co-founder of the Global Burden of Disease Study with Christopher J.L. Murray, and co-founded the Peto-Lopez method with Sir Richard Peto, to estimate tobacco-attributable mortality from vital statistics. Lopez is on the editorial boards of PLoS Medicine, The International Journal of Epidemiology and Preventive Medicine, BMC Medicine, and is co-Editor in Chief of Population Health Metrics. He is also a member of the Scientific Advisory Committee for the International Network for the Demographic Evaluation of Populations and their Health in Developing Countries (INDEPTH Network). He was a member of the Wellcome Trust Population and Public Health Funding Committee (2007–10), the WHO Expert Committee on Non-communicable Disease Surveillance (2009–11), the United States National Academy of Sciences Panel on Divergent Trends in Longevity (2008–11), the Scientific Board of the Oxford Health Alliance Grand Challenges in Non-Communicable Disease (2006–09), and was former Chair of the Health and Medical Research Council of Queensland.

He has been awarded several major research grants in epidemiology, health services research and population health, including funding from the NHMRC, Wellcome Trust, Bill and Melinda Gates Foundation and AusAID, and is currently the Chief Investigator-A on national and international competitive research grants in excess of A$10 million. He was elected to the Institute of Medicine of the US National Academies of the United States in 2009 and awarded the Peter Wills medal in 2014 by Research Australia for his outstanding contribution in building Australia's international reputation in health and medical research.

In 2016 Lopez was appointed a Companion of the Order of Australia for eminent service to science, both nationally and internationally, as an academic, researcher and author, and to the advancement of planning and policy development to improve public health in developing countries. In 2017 he was elected Fellow of the Australian Academy of Health and Medical Sciences and from 2020-2021 he was a Fellow of the Academy of the Social Sciences in Australia.

== Sexual-misconduct allegation ==
In 2021, The Age reported that Lopez was allegedly found to sexually harassed a female colleague, Ashley Frederes, at The University of Melbourne in 2015 at a hotel in Shanghai, China during a meeting with Chinese health officials as part of a university project. An independent investigation found that on the balance of probabilities that Lopez groped Frederes in a lift and making unwanted advances such as attempting kiss her and blocking her from exiting his hotel room. Frederes had been in his hotel room as the meeting rooms were closed at the time and alleged, "He was physically blocking me from leaving and that’s when he went in to hug me, and I just went to hug back to make it quick and leave," in both written and verbal accounts during the investigation. Lopez "categorically denies" the allegations and results of the investigation. He says, "I firmly and absolutely deny ever having touched or intimidated her in the manner which she alleges: none of the actions she described happened then, or on any other occasion." Despite the allegations and investigation into his conduct, Lopez was initially able to keep his position at the university and continued to work there.
