= Megan B. Murray =

American epidemiologist

Megan Murray
- Relatives: Christopher J. L. Murray (brother)

Academic background
- Education: Dartmouth College (BS); Harvard University (MD, MPH, DPH)
- Thesis: Methodological problems in the molecular epidemiology of tuberculosis (2000)

Academic work
- Institutions: Harvard T.H. Chan School of Public Health

Megan Blanche Murray is an American epidemiologist and an infectious disease physician. She is the Ronda Stryker and William Johnston Professor of Global Health in the Department of Epidemiology at the Harvard T.H. Chan School of Public Health.

== Early life and education ==
Murray was born to a New Zealand-born scientist father and grew up in Minnesota with three siblings, including Christopher J. L. Murray. As her father was an internist and her mother was a microbiologist, the family moved to Niger for various charitable medical missions.

After earning her undergraduate degree from Dartmouth College in 1980, Murray traveled to Thailand with the Intergovernmental Committee for Migration to conduct Tuberculosis (TB) screenings. She later earned her medical degree from Harvard Medical School and her Master's (MPH) and Doctor of Public Health (DPH) at the Harvard T.H. Chan School of Public Health. Murray simultaneously completed her residency at Massachusetts General Hospital while specialising in infectious diseases.

== Career ==
Following her DPH, Murray joined the Department of Epidemiology at the Harvard T.H. Chan School of Public Health as an assistant professor. During the 2002–2004 SARS outbreak, she worked with Postdoctoral fellow Ted Cohen to develop a mathematical model that proved that a number of multidrug-resistant strains of tuberculosis can easily reproduce and spread. She also worked with Marc Lipsitch to create a mathematical model to estimate the speed of SARS in China and how to effectively lower its transmission. The following year, she sat on the Medical Advisory Committee on Avian Flu to "advise top University officials in real time about the medical aspects of the flu."

In 2007, Murray co-published Transmission Dynamics and Control of Severe Acute Respiratory Syndrome in the peer-reviewed academic journal Science. They used data collected in Singapore to calculate how long it takes for the disease to spread from one individual to another. Later, while working as a co-principal investigator in an international collaboration project using Whole genome sequencing, she concluded that Mycobacterium tuberculosis was directly linked to more than 50 deaths during a tuberculosis outbreak in KwaZulu-Natal, South Africa.

The following year, Murray was appointed the Principal Investigator of a multidrug-resistant tuberculosis study to better understand the development and transmission of drug resistant tuberculosis. She also worked with Sarah Fortune to identify how tuberculosis develops drug-resistance mutations. In 2013, Murray and Maha Farhat led a group of researchers in adapting Phylogenetics to discover the drug-resistance genes in humans. Their research resulted in the discovery of 39 new genes associated with elevated drug resistance. Two years later, Murray published a study she led in Peru on how transmissible multidrug-resistant tuberculosis was. Her research team received a grant from the National Institutes of Health and began gathering data in Peru by 2009. The group studied 25 districts in Lima and gathered information about which genetic strains are likely to be drug-resistant. The aim of the study was to use the collected data to improve diagnosis of drug-resistance in patients and discover risk factors.

During the Western African Ebola virus epidemic, Murray co-published a research paper with Ann Miller titled ReEBOV Antigen Rapid Test kit for point-of-care and laboratory-based testing for Ebola virus disease: a field validation study in The Lancet. The aim of the study was to develop a more accurate test for diagnosing Ebola by using a finger stick to draw sample blood and apply it to a treated strip. The test took about 15 minutes to diagnose instead of numerous days. Since 2015, she has sat on the editorial board for PLOS Medicine and later the European Journal of Epidemiology.

As a result of her research, Murray was appointed the inaugural Ronda Stryker and William Johnston Professor of Global Health at Harvard Medical School in May 2017. She was also named the director of research at the Brigham and Women's Division of Global Health Equity and at Partners In Health. In this role, she led the first large-scale study on how the tuberculosis bacterium affects different individuals based on their genes. They concluded that "some of the risk for early disease progression is driven by several gene variants, at least one of which controls key immune functions."

During the COVID-19 pandemic, Murray approached the Abundance Foundation with the theory that the BCG vaccine could protect people against the virus.
