= Frank Clifford Rose =

English neurologist

- Born: Frank Clifford Rosenberg; 29 August 1926; London, England
- Died: 1 November 2012 (aged 86)
- Education: King's College; Westminster Hospital
- Occupation: Neurologist
- Known for: First consultant neurologist at Charing Cross Hospital, London; Role in founding; Princess Margaret Migraine Clinic; Motor Neurone Disease Association
- Medical career
- Profession: Physician
- Field: Neurology
- Institutions: Lambeth Hospital; St. Thomas's Hospital; Charing Cross Hospital
- Sub-specialties: Neuro-ophthalmology; History of neuroscience
- Research: Aphasiology; Motor neurone disease; Stroke; Migraine

Frank Clifford Rose (born Rosenberg, 29 August 1926 – 1 November 2012) was a British neurologist, active in several journals and societies related to the specialty of neurology and its history, whose research contributed to the understanding of motor neurone disease, stroke and migraine. He developed an emergency stroke ambulance service with early neuroimaging, allowing for the detection of early reversible brain damage. In 1974, he established what would later be known as the Princess Margaret Migraine Clinic, a specialist clinic for headache at Charing Cross Hospital, where in 1965 he became their first appointed consultant neurologist.

Rose completed early neurological training at the National Hospital for Neurology and Neurosurgery at Queen Square, followed by placements in the United States, Paris, and then at St George's Hospital at Hyde Park Corner and Atkinson Morley Hospital. He subsequently held several consultant posts in London.

He was the secretary-treasurer general of the World Federation of Neurology (WFN), the first editor-in-chief of World Neurology, founding editor of the Journal of the History of the Neurosciences, and founding chair of the WFN's Research Group on the History of the Neurosciences. He coedited the Headache Quarterly magazine for over 20 years, was editor-in-chief of the journal Neuroepidemiology and the Transactions of the Medical Society of London during the 1980s, and he wrote several books.

== Early life and education ==
Frank Clifford Rosenberg, also known as FCR to his trainees, was born on 29 August 1926 in London, to Jewish parents, who had immigrated from Fălticeni, Romania, in 1913 and settled in the East End of London, where they ran a bicycle shop. The youngest of six siblings, he attended the Central Foundation Boys' School in Cowper Street, but was evacuated at the age of 13 at the outbreak of the Second World War.

He gained a scholarship to study medicine at King's College in London for his pre-clinical studies, followed by clinical years at Westminster Hospital, where he gained the confidence of Swithin Pinder Meadows, one of Westminster's renowned neurologists. The encounter possibly led to Rose's later interest in neuro-ophthalmology, having, as a student, impressed Meadows with a diagnosis of primary optic atrophy. He qualified in 1949 by which time he was known as Rose.

== Career ==
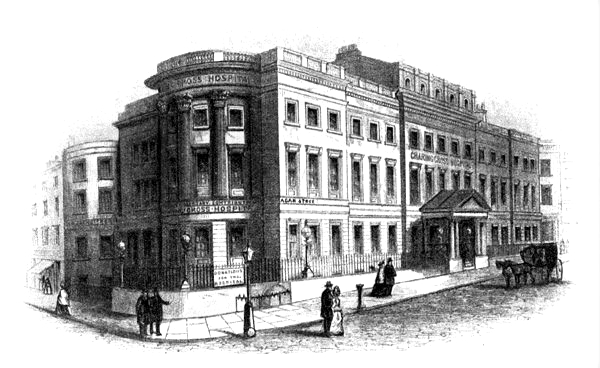
Charing Cross Hospital in Agar Street, Westminster, the home of the hospital from 1834 to 1973

Rose's early medical training consisted of appointments in the specialties of paediatrics, general medicine, cardiology and rheumatology. In 1955, he returned to Westminster Hospital as senior medical registrar and clinical tutor. Between 1957 and 1960, he held training posts at the National Hospital for Neurology and Neurosurgery at Queen Square, and was then appointed as a senior registrar in neurology at St George's Hospital at Hyde Park Corner, where he worked under neurologist Denis Williams, and at Atkinson Morley Hospital, part of St George's, where he made a reputation for himself working with neurosurgeon Wylie McKissock.

Later in 1960, he trained at the University of California, San Francisco, under neurologist Robert B. Aird for six months, then spent three months at Pitié-Salpêtrière Hospital in Paris the following year. In 1963, after turning down a job at the University of Rochester he returned to England to become consultant in neurology at the Royal Eye Medical Ophthalmology Unit at the Lambeth Hospital, where he was part of a team of three physicians including Geraint James. He also kept sessions at St. Thomas's Hospital. In 1965 he became the first consultant in neurology at Charing Cross Hospital, where he also founded its Academic Unit. His private practice was based in Harley Street.

Rose had an interest in neuro-ophthalmology and his research contributed to the understanding of aphasiology. He made significant contributions to the management of motor neurone disease, stroke and migraine, three areas of neurology which became increasingly important over time. He developed an emergency stroke ambulance service with early neuroimaging, allowing for the detection of early reversible brain damage. In 1974, he established a specialist clinic for headache at Charing Cross. Six years later, it became the Princess Margaret Migraine Clinic, a move endorsed by his friend MacDonald Critchley. With regards to the role of alcohol and headaches, following his study of the effect of red wine on preselected red wine sensitive migraine sufferers, he stated that red wine could trigger a migraine, but any alcohol might provoke a headache.

== Other roles ==
Rose was the secretary-treasurer general of the World Federation of Neurology (WFN) when its president was John Walton. He was the first editor-in-chief of World Neurology, founding editor of the Journal of the History of the Neurosciences, and founding chair of the WFN's Research Group on the History of the Neurosciences. He co-edited Headache Quarterly from 1980 to 2001 and was editor-in-chief of the journals Neuroepidemiology from 1984 to 1990 and Transactions of the Medical Society of London from 1980 to 1986.

He played a significant part in the foundation of the International Society for the History of the Neurosciences (ISHN). From 1987 to 1995, he was chairman of the Migraine Trust. Between 1988 and 1991, he was the medical advisor to the Motor Neurone Disease Association, an organisation he co-founded, and was chairman of its research committee. In 1992, he was made an honorary member of the Neurological Society of Thailand, the Austrian Society of Neurology and the Mexican Association for the Study of Headache.

In his book Neurology of the arts: painting, music, literature (2004), he included Van Gogh's likely ailments. He co-authored with Marek Gawel a book for patients Migraine the Facts. Of the greater than 70 volumes of books either coauthored or edited by Rose, his last was the History of British Neurology, published in 2011.

== Awards and honours ==
In 1983, Rose was elected president of the Medical Society of London, and in 1990 he became president of the section of clinical neurosciences of the Royal Society of Medicine. He was also a member of the Osler Club of London, and was a liveryman of the Worshipful Society of Apothecaries.

In 1986, Rose received the Distinguished Clinician Award from the American Association for the Study of Headache. He received their Harold Wolff Award twice. In 2002, he received the Lifetime Achievement Award of the ISHN.

== Personal life ==
Three days after returning from a trip to the United States in 1963, Rose met musician, Angela Juliet Halsted. They were engaged two weeks later and after a further three months, were married. They had three sons. In 2006, they moved to Little Bedwyn, Wiltshire, where 12 years earlier, he had organised the unveiling of a blue plaque at Thomas Willis's birthplace.

== Death ==
Rose died on 1 November 2012, age 86. His obituary was published in The Times, Munk's Roll, the British Medical Journal, Cephalalgia, and the Journal of the History of the Neurosciences: Basic and Clinical Perspectives.

His autobiography, By Any Other Name, was published posthumously.

== Selected publications ==
=== Books ===
- Migraine: The facts. Oxford: Oxford University Press. 1997. ISBN 978-0-19-261161-1. OCLC 606056105. (Co-authored with Marek Gawel)
- Twentieth century neurology: The British contribution. London; River Edge, New Jersey: Imperial College Press; Distributed by, USA Office, World Scientific Pub. 2001. ISBN 978-1-84816-166-5. OCLC 261126840.
- Motor neurone disease. London: Class. 2003. ISBN 978-1-85959-140-6. OCLC 60609604. (Co-authored with Stuart Neilson)
- Neurology of music. London; Singapore; Hackensack, New Jersey: Imperial College Press; Distributed by World Scientific. 2010. ISBN 978-1-84816-268-6. OCLC 244765474.
- By any other name: An autobiography. CreateSpace, 2015. (Edited by Angela Rose) ISBN 978-1514132210

=== Articles ===
- Rose, F. Clifford; Symonds, C. P. (1 June 1960). "Persistent memory defect following encephalitis". Brain. 83 (2): 195–212. doi:10.1093/brain/83.2.195. ISSN 0006-8950. PMID 14438826. (Joint author)
- Rose, F. C. (January 1982). "The Princess Margaret migraine clinic, Charing Cross Hospital, London". Panminerva Medica. 24 (1): 29–31. ISSN 0031-0808. PMID 7145443.
- Peatfield, RC; Glover, V.; Littlewood, JT; Sandler, M.; Rose, F Clifford (1984). "The prevalence of diet-induced migraine". Cephalalgia. 4 (3): 179–183. doi:10.1046/j.1468-2982.1984.0403179.x. ISSN 1468-2982. PMID 6498931. S2CID 42796753. (Joint author)
- Gibb, CM; Davies, PTG; Glover, V.; Steiner, TJ; Rose, F Clifford; Sandler, M. (1991). "Chocolate is a migraine-provoking agent". Cephalalgia. 11 (2): 93–95. doi:10.1046/j.1468-2982.1991.1102093.x. ISSN 1468-2982. PMID 1860135. S2CID 29208133. (Joint author)
- Rose, F. C. (1 October 1995). "The history of migraine from Mesopotamian to medieval times". Cephalalgia. 15 (15_suppl): 1–3. doi:10.1111/J.1468-2982.1995.TB00040.X. ISSN 0333-1024. PMID 8749238. S2CID 10023739.
- Rose, F. Clifford (February 2006). "Van Gogh's madness". The Neurobiology of Painting. International Review of Neurobiology. Vol. 74. pp. 253–69. doi:10.1016/S0074-7742(06)74018-1. ISBN 9780123668752. PMID 16730519.
- Rose, F. Clifford (February 2006). "The Deafness of Goya (1746–1828)". The Neurobiology of Painting. International Review of Neurobiology. Vol. 74. pp. 301–16. doi:10.1016/S0074-7742(06)74022-3. ISBN 9780123668752. PMID 16730523.
