= Sarah Fortune =

American immunologist

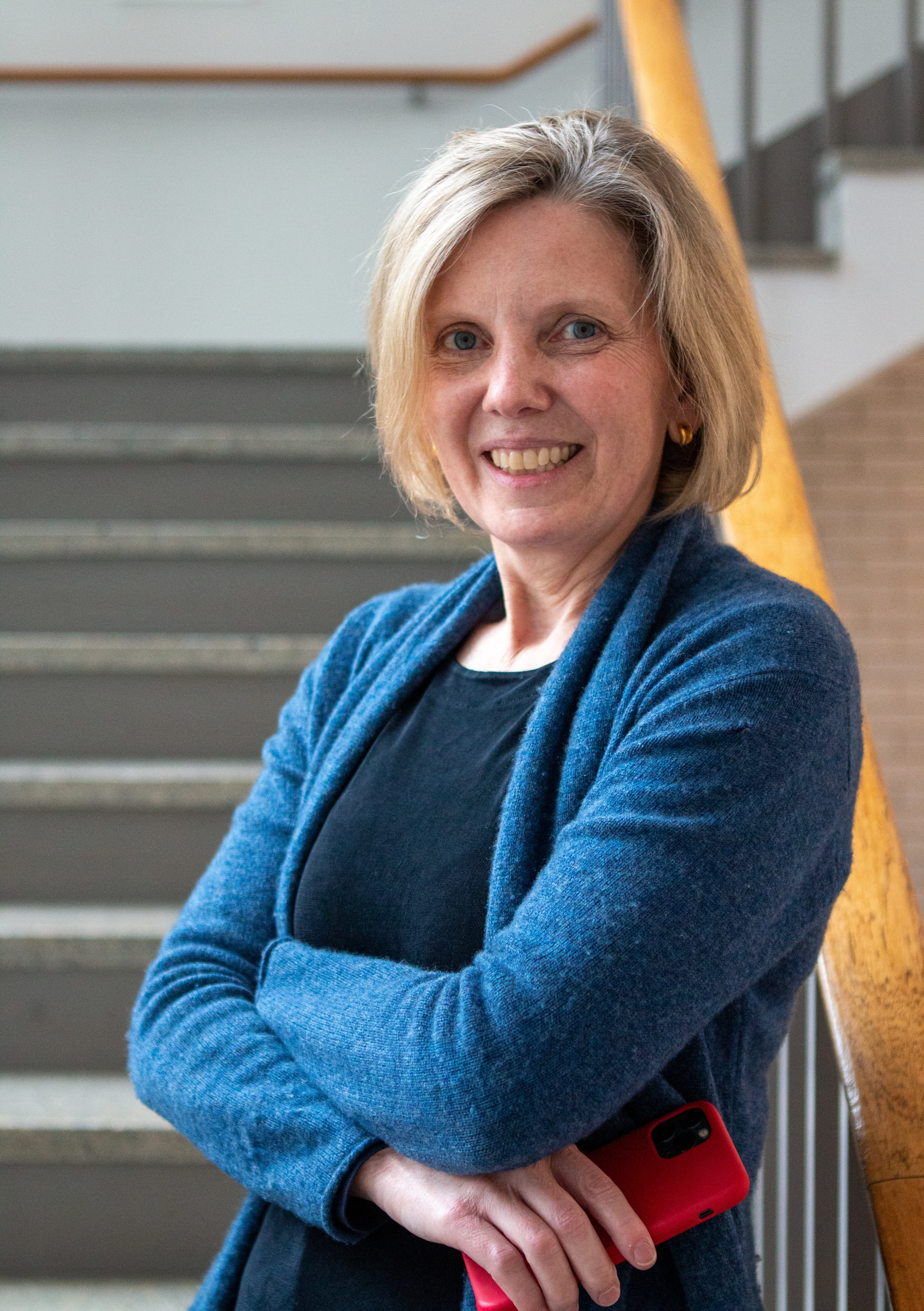
- Sarah Fortune
- Born: Sarah Merritt Fortune; 1968 (age 57–58); Lexington, Kentucky, USA
- Spouse: Timothy Worrall Hyde (m. 1996)
- Children: India Hyde, Elias Hyde

Academic background
- Education: B.S, 1990, Yale University; MD., 1997, Columbia University College of Physicians and Surgeons

Academic work
- Institutions: Harvard University

Sarah Merritt Fortune (born 1968) is an American immunologist. She is a Full Professor of Immunology and Infectious Diseases in the Department of Immunology and Infectious Diseases at the Harvard T.H. Chan School of Public Health.

== Personal life ==
Fortune was born to parents Beverly and William Fortune in Lexington, Kentucky. Her father was a professor at the University of Kentucky College of Law and her mother was a reporter at the Lexington Herald-Leader.

== Career ==
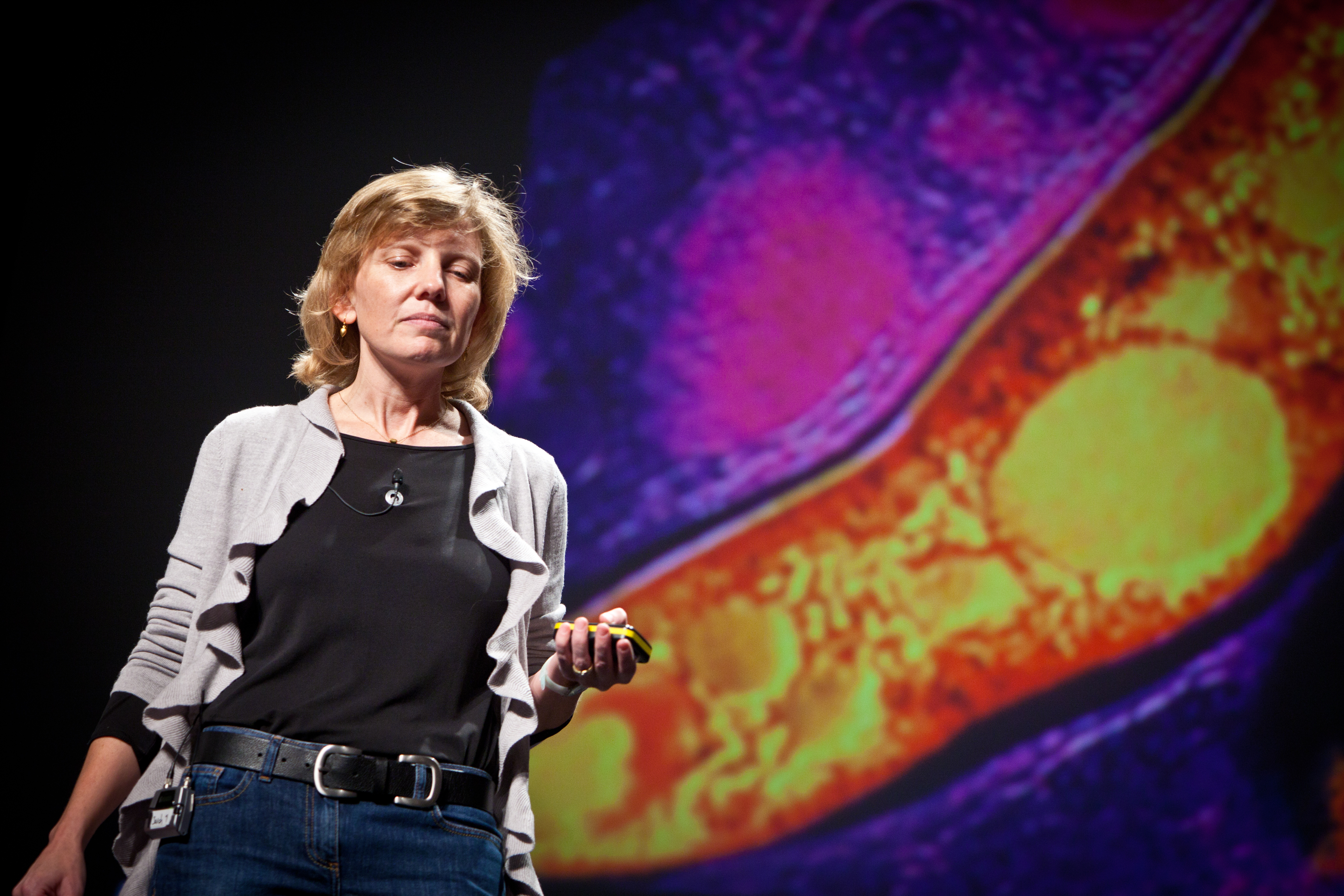
Fortune in 2010 presenting at PopTech

After earning her MD at the Columbia University College of Physicians and Surgeons, she completed an internship and medical residency in Internal Medicine at Brigham and Women's Hospital. By 2006, Fortune accepted an assistant professor position in the Department of Immunology and Infectious Diseases at the Harvard T.H. Chan School of Public Health. Fortune's research focuses on attempting to understand how M. tuberculosis (Mtb) mutates itself to become drug resistant. She collaborated with Harvard professor Megan B. Murray to study how tuberculosis develops drug-resistance mutations. In 2010, Fortune was the recipient of a Clinical Scientist Development Award from the Doris Duke Charitable Foundation.

In 2012, she was appointed the Melvin J. and Geraldine L. Glimcher Associate Professor of Biological Sciences. Three years later, she was promoted to full professor. In 2019, Fortune's research lab, the Harvard Chan School IMPAc-TB Center, received a contract award to help establish three new Immune Mechanisms of Protection Against Mycobacterium tuberculosis (IMPAc-TB) Centers. In 2021, Fortune was elected a Fellow of the American Academy of Microbiology.
