= Journal of Dental Research =

- Discipline: Dentistry
- Language: English
- Edited by: Nicholas Jakubovics

Publication details
- History: 1919-present
- Publisher: SAGE Publications on behalf of the International and American Association for Dental Research
- Frequency: Monthly
- Impact factor: 8.924 (2021)

Standard abbreviations
- ISO 4: J. Dent. Res.

Indexing
- CODEN: JDREAF
- ISSN: 0022-0345 (print); 1544-0591 (web)
- OCLC no.: 1754534

Links
- Journal homepage; Online access; Online archive

The Journal of Dental Research is a peer-reviewed medical journal that covers all aspects of dentistry. The editor-in-chief is Nicholas Jakubovics (Newcastle University, UK). It was established in 1919 and is published by SAGE Publications on behalf of the International and American Association for Dental Research.

== Abstracting and indexing ==
The journal is abstracted and indexed in Scopus and the Science Citation Index. According to the Journal Citation Reports, the journal has an impact factor of 8.924 for the year 2021.
