= Population Health Metrics =

- Discipline: Public health
- Language: English
- Edited by: Christopher JL Murray, Alan D Lopez

Publication details
- History: 2003-present
- Publisher: BioMed Central
- Frequency: Continuous
- Impact factor: 3.347 (2014)

Standard abbreviations
- ISO 4: Popul. Health Metr.

Indexing
- ISSN: 1478-7954

Links
- Journal homepage; Online access

Population Health Metrics (PHM) is a BioMed Central "open access, peer-reviewed, online journal featuring innovative research that addresses all aspects of the measurement of population health, including concepts, methods, ethics, and results." PHM is one of the few journals that focuses on population health and all of its sub-disciplines. The journal is edited by co-editors-in-chief, Christopher J.L. Murray and Alan D. Lopez and is further supported by a 25-person expert editorial board. The journal "is tracked by Thomson Reuters (ISI) and has a 2014 Impact Factor of 3.347.
