= Frank Atcherley Rose =

British surgeon (1873–1935)

Frank Atcherley Rose FRCS
- Born: 5 October 1873; Bedford, England
- Died: 30 May 1935 (aged 61); Bedford, England
- Education: Bedford Modern School
- Alma mater: St John's College, Cambridge; St Bartholomew's Hospital
- Known for: Throat surgeon

Frank Atcherley Rose FRCS (5 October 1873 – 30 May 1935) was a well known British specialist in diseases of the throat, Surgeon to the Throat and Nose Department at St Bartholomew's Hospital and Surgeon to the Hospital for Diseases of the Throat, Golden Square (now the Royal National Throat, Nose and Ear Hospital).

== Life ==
Rose was born on 5 October 1873 in Bedford, the son of Edward Paine Rose and Fanny Atcherley. He was educated at Bedford Modern School and St John's College, Cambridge where he gained first class honours in the Natural Sciences Tripos.

In 1895 he started his medical training at St Bartholomew's Hospital where he won the Shuter prize and was house surgeon to Sir Henry Butlin. In 1902 he graduated M.B., B.Ch.Camb and was made a Fellow of the Royal College of Surgeons in 1903. He served during World War I as a Captain (R.A.M.C. (T)) and in 1930 was elected President of the Laryngological Society.

Having decided to specialise in laryngology, Rose became assistant surgeon at the Royal Northern Hospital and was placed in charge of the throat and nose departments at St Bartholomew's Hospital on the resignation of Mr W.D. Harmer (1928–31).

In 1912 Rose married Marian Elisabeth Darling, the daughter of Dr. A.C.E. Harris of Birkenhead. She died in 1919 leaving him with a son and a daughter. Rose died in Bedford on 30 May 1935.
