= Neuroepidemiology (journal) =

- Discipline: Epidemiology, neurology
- Language: English
- Edited by: Valery Feigin

Publication details
- History: 1982-present
- Publisher: Karger Publishers
- Frequency: Bimonthly
- Impact factor: 2.558 (2014)

Standard abbreviations
- ISO 4: Neuroepidemiology

Indexing
- CODEN: NEEPD3
- ISSN: 0251-5350 (print); 1423-0208 (web)
- OCLC no.: 859674707

Links
- Journal homepage

Neuroepidemiology is a bimonthly peer-reviewed medical journal covering the epidemiology of neurological conditions. It was established in 1982 with Bruce Schoenberg as the founding editor-in-chief, and is published by Karger Publishers. The current editor-in-chief is Valery Feigin (AUT). It is the official journal of the International Association of Neurology and Epidemiology. According to the Journal Citation Reports, the journal has a 2014 impact factor of 2.558.
