= Christopher J.L. Murray =

American global health researcher (born 1962)

Christopher Murray
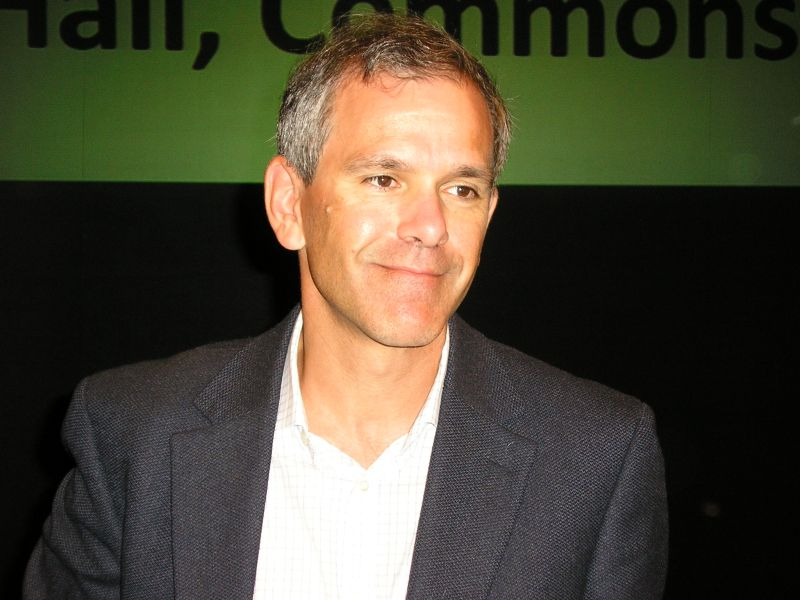
- Murray in 2010
- Born: August 15, 1962 (age 64); Minneapolis, Minnesota, U.S.
- Relatives: Megan B. Murray (sister)

Academic background
- Education: Harvard University (AB, MD); University of Oxford (DPhil)

Academic work
- Discipline: Health economics; global health
- Institutions: University of Washington; Harvard University; World Health Organization
- Notable ideas: Disability-adjusted life year

Christopher James Livingstone Murray (born August 16, 1962) is an American physician and health economist serving as a professor at the University of Washington and as the director of the Institute for Health Metrics and Evaluation, a global health research institute best known for coordinating the Global Burden of Disease (GBD) study. Prior to joining the University of Washington, Murray was a professor of public policy at the Harvard School of Public Health from 2003 to 2007 and a policy worker at the World Health Organization from 1998 to 2003.

Alongside collaborators such as Alan Lopez, Murray is known for creating the Global Burden of Disease study, an international effort to quantify the causes of death and disability worldwide. Since the early 1990s, Murray and his collaborators have published several iterations of the GBD study, often in special issues of The Lancet. Through his work on the GBD study, Murray is also credited as a pioneer of the disability-adjusted life year concept, a measure introduced in the 1993 World Development Report that is now widely used to evaluate the burden of disease and effectiveness of health interventions.

== Early life and education ==
Christopher J.L. Murray was born on August 15, 1962, to John and Anne Murray in Minneapolis, Minnesota. Both of his parents were from New Zealand, having met on a train returning from a school break to the University of Otago, where both were students. His parents would later move to Minnesota to take up positions at the Mayo Clinic. His mother was a microbiologist and his father was a cardiologist who later became a professor at the University of Minnesota.

Murray has three older siblings: Linda, Nigel, and Megan, now a professor in the epidemiology department of Harvard T.H. Chan School of Public Health. The family traveled often throughout Murray's childhood, visiting Thailand, Kenya, Afghanistan, Egypt, India, and Lebanon, in addition to many places in the United States.

In 1973, Murray traveled with his family to Diffa, Niger, where they worked in an otherwise unstaffed regional hospital built as part of an Italian overseas development program. While in Niger, the Murray family observed acute attacks of malaria in otherwise malnourished patients given food, suggesting a link between nutrition and the reproduction of the parasite. After returning to Minnesota, John Murray conducted experiments demonstrating that malaria infections grew faster in rats receiving intravenous iron. The results of the study were published in The Lancet under the names of Christopher Murray's parents, in addition to two of his siblings.

Murray attended Harvard University, where he graduated with Bachelor of Arts and Science degrees in 1984. During his undergraduate degree, Murray traveled in Tunisia, Egypt, India, and Pakistan, where he wrote for the travel guidebook series Let's Go. His senior thesis was advised by E. O. Wilson, and focused on the number of species a given area could support as a nature reserve.

His senior year, Murray was selected as a Rhodes Scholar and enrolled at the University of Oxford, where he would receive a DPhil in international health economics. In 1985, Murray moved to the World Health Organization (WHO) in Geneva, where he met Alan Lopez and developed an interest in epidemiological statistics. He graduated from Oxford in 1987, and the same year published a critique of the methodology of several prominent epidemiological datasets, including those published in the United Nations Demographic Yearbook and the World Development Report. After returning to the United States, Murray received an MD from Harvard Medical School in 1991.

== Career ==
From 1998 to 2003, Murray was the executive director of the Evidence and Information for Policy Cluster at the World Health Organization, serving under Director-General Gro Harlem Brundtland. Following that, Murray was employed at Harvard University from 2003 to 2007. While there, he held stints as the director of the Harvard Initiative for Global Health and as director of the Harvard Center for Population and Development Studies; he was named Richard Saltonstall Professor of Public Policy in the Harvard School of Public Health.

He moved to the University of Washington in 2007 to direct the newly-established Institute for Health Metrics and Evaluation (IHME), which had been established with the help of a donation from the Gates Foundation under the advice of advisor Julio Frenk. The university established a health metrics sciences department in 2018 and Murray was named its first chair. He was honored with the 2018 Canada Gairdner Global Health Award, which was given to him and Lopez for their work on the Global Burden of Disease study.

The IHME COVID model was called the "Chris Murray model" in a White House press briefing. In 2020, Murray was appointed by the Council on Foreign Relations to serve on its Independent Task Force on Improving Pandemic Preparedness, co-chaired by Sylvia Mathews Burwell and Frances Fragos Townsend.

== Research ==
While at Harvard, Murray, along with medical demographer Alan Lopez, developed the disability-adjusted life year (DALY) approach to measuring the global burden of disease. Using this approach, it is possible to calculate standardized estimates for the years of healthy life lost due to disease, injury and risk factors over time. It is also possible to compare the effects of different diseases on a population. The research is intended to be used by policy makers to weigh healthcare decisions and allocate resources.

The idea behind the work was to remove politics and other pressures from the research questions. This led to some tension when the team moved to the World Health Organization. When countries and organizations were found to have poorer-than-expected health outcomes, they complained to the W.H.O. At one point, an independent committee was formed to review some of the results.

His work attracted the attention of Bill Gates, who decided to use the concept of DALYs to help determine priorities and evaluate potential projects in global health. In 2007, the Bill & Melinda Gates Foundation, along with the state of Washington, established IHME and selected Murray as its leader. As head of IHME, Murray greatly expanded on his earlier research, leading an effort by 486 researchers from 302 institutions in 50 countries to produce Global Burden of Disease reports in 2010 and 2013.

The later reports were significantly larger than the first. In 1990, for example, researchers catalogued 107 diseases and injuries. The 2013 report involved creating and then analyzing a database of over 800 million deaths, and produced estimates for death and disability from 240 health conditions.

Some of the findings from his studies have been controversial. In 2010, The Lancet published one such study on global maternal death rates, showing, to the surprise of some in the field, that maternal mortality had dropped significantly over the prior three decades. Fearing the results might undermine their ongoing efforts, some advocacy groups tried to delay publication of the material, The Lancet editor said at the time.

In 2008, The Lancet published findings from Murray and IHME's work evaluating the work of Gavi, the vaccine alliance, which showed many countries had been inflating the number of children being immunized for diphtheria, pertussis, and tetanus. The study found that progress in childhood immunizations is far lower than prior official reports. The countries were receiving funding for the vaccinations, raising the concern that Gavi may have paid out much more than it should have based on the number of children immunized. After the report was published Gavi suspended payments and commenced a review.
