= Sweetwater, Idaho =

- Census-designated place
- Location of Sweetwater in Nez Perce County, Idaho.

- Location within Idaho
- Coordinates: 46°22′21″N 116°47′35″W
- Country: United States
- State: Idaho
- County: Nez Perce

Area
  - Total: 1.191 sq mi (3.08 km^{2})
  - Land: 1.191 sq mi (3.08 km^{2})
  - Water: 0 sq mi (0 km^{2})
- Elevation: 1,096 ft (334 m)

Population (2010)
  - Total: 143
  - Density: 120/sq mi (46.4/km^{2})
- Time zone: UTC-8 (Pacific (PST))
  - Summer (DST): UTC-7 (PDT)
- Area codes: 208, 986
- GNIS feature ID: 398208

Sweetwater is a census-designated place (CDP) in northern Nez Perce County, Idaho, United States. As of the 2020 census, Sweetwater had a population of 155.

== Description ==
The CDP is located along Lapwai Creek and U.S. Route 95 in the Lapwai Valley, about 2.5 miles (4.0 km) south of Lapwai.

== Demographics ==
Historical population
Census	Pop.	Note	%±
2010	143		—
2020	155		8.4%
U.S. Decennial Census

== See also ==
- List of census-designated places in Idaho
