= List of music students by teacher: A to B =

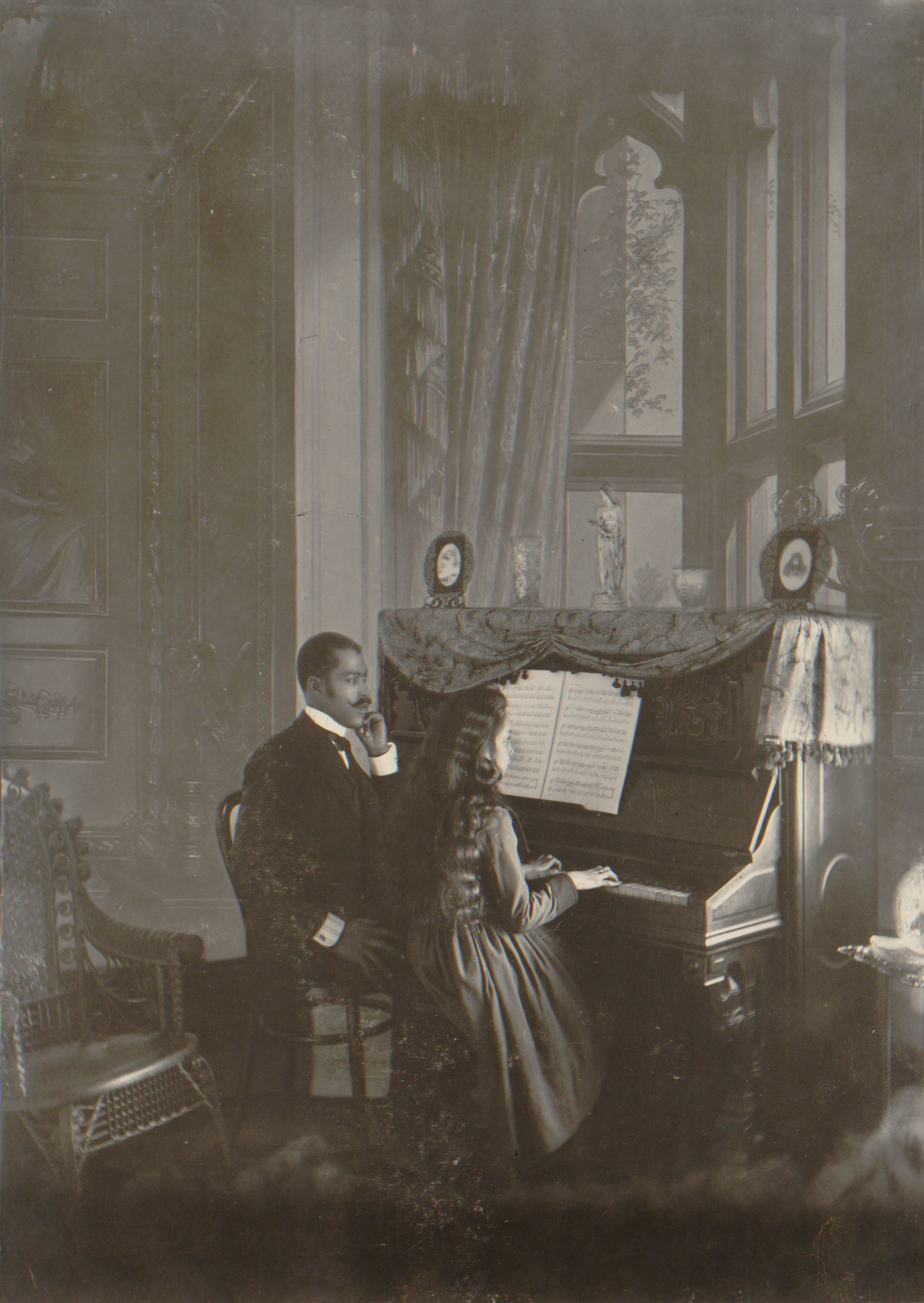

This is a list of students of music, organized by teacher.

== A ==
=== Arkady Abaza ===
this teacher's teachers
Abaza (1843–1915) studied with teachers including Alexander Dreyschock and Camille Everardi.
- Nikolai Roslavets

=== Christian Ferdinand Abel ===
- Carl Friedrich Abel

=== Hermann Abendroth ===
this teacher's teachers
Abendroth (1883–1956) studied with teachers including Ludwig Thuille.
- Allard de Ridder [pupils]
- Herbert Eimert [pupils]
- Günther Herbig
- Hermann Schroeder [pupils]
- Wilhelm Schüchter
- William Steinberg

=== Hans Abrahamsen ===
this teacher's teachers
Abrahamsen (born 1952) studied with teachers including György Ligeti, Per Nørgård, and Pelle Gudmundsen-Holmgreen.
- Jörgen Dafgård

=== Dieter Acker ===
- Susanne Erding-Swiridoff

=== Adolphe Adam ===
this teacher's teachers
Adam (1803–1856) studied with teachers including Charles-Simon Catel, François Benoist, and François-Adrien Boieldieu.
- Léo Delibes [pupils]
- Ferdinand Poise
- Loïsa Puget

=== Louis Adam ===
this teacher's teachers
Adam (1758-1848) studied with teachers including Jean-Frédéric Edelmann.
- Joseph Daussoigne-Méhul [pupils]
- Ferdinand Hérold
- Friedrich Kalkbrenner [pupils]
- Henry Lemoine
- Augustine Renaud d`Allen [pupils]

=== John Luther Adams ===
this teacher's teachers
Adams (born 1953) studied with teachers including Leonard Stein and James Tenney.
- Corey Dargel
- Katherine Gordon
- Ryan Maguire
- Todd Tarantino

=== Murray Adaskin ===
this teacher's teachers
Adaskin (1906–2002) studied with teachers including John Weinzweig.
- Andrew Dawes
- Boyd McDonald
- Paul Pedersen
- Rodney Sharman
- Timothy Williams

=== Guido Adler ===
this teacher's teachers
Adler (1855–1941) studied with teachers including Anton Bruckner and Felix Otto Dessoff.
- Hans Gál [pupils]
- Józef Koffler
- Johanna Müller-Hermann
- Karel Navrátil [pupils]
- Dragan Plamenac
- Anton Webern [pupils]
- Egon Wellesz [pupils]

=== Oskar Adler ===
- Hans Keller
- Arnold Schoenberg [pupils]

=== Samuel Adler ===
this teacher's teachers
Adler (born 1928) studied with teachers including Aaron Copland, Paul Hindemith, Serge Koussevitzky, Walter Piston, and Randall Thompson.
- Kathryn Alexander
- Martin Amlin
- Claude Baker [pupils]
- Roger Briggs
- Jason Robert Brown
- David Crumb
- Greg Danner
- Eric Ewazen
- Peng-Peng Gong
- Jay Greenberg
- Kevin Hanlon
- Anthony Iannaccone
- Kamran Ince
- Mark Isaacs
- Michael Isaacson
- Martin Kennedy
- Annette LeSiege [pupils]
- Scott Lindroth
- Marc Mellits
- Carter Pann [pupils]
- Robert Paterson
- Paul Phillips
- Paul Reller
- Michael Alec Rose
- Jonathan Schwabe
- Daria Semegen [pupils]
- Gordon Stout
- Christopher Theofanidis
- Michael Sidney Timpson
- Fisher Tull
- Dalit Warshaw
- Dan Welcher [pupils]
- Michael Glenn Williams
- Dana Wilson
- Ye Xiaogang
- Reena Esmail

=== Jakob Adlung ===
this teacher's teachers
J. Adlung (1699–1762) studied with teachers including David Adlung, Johann Nikolaus Bach, and Christian Reichardt.
- Johann Christian Kittel [pupils]

=== Guido Agosti ===
this teacher's teachers
Agosti (1901–1989) studied with teachers including Giacomo Benvenuti, Ferruccio Busoni, Filippo Ivaldi, and Bruno Mugellini.
- Dag Achatz
- Donna Amato
- Sergio Calligaris
- Leslie Howard
- William Corbett Jones
- Martin Jones
- Vladimir Krpan
- Raymond Lewenthal
- Barbara Lister-Sink
- Hamish Milne [pupils]
- Ian Munro
- Kun-Woo Paik
- Daniel Pollack
- Yonty Solomon [pupils]
- Paul Stewart
- Maria Tipo

=== Albrecht Agthe ===
this teacher's teachers
Agthe (1790–1873) studied with teachers including Michael Gotthard Fischer.
- Anna Steiniger Clark
- Adolph Kullak
- Theodor Kullak [pupils]
- Louis Plaidy [pupils]

=== Webster Aitken ===
this teacher's teachers
Aitken (1908–1981) studied with teachers including Emil von Sauer.
- Malcolm Bilson

=== Jean-Delphin Alard ===
this teacher's teachers
Alard (1815–1888) studied with teachers including François-Joseph Fétis and François Habeneck.
- Gerónimo Giménez
- José White Lafitte
- Pablo de Sarasate [pupils]
- Jean-Baptiste Vuillaume

=== Jules Alary ===
- George Frederick Root

=== Carlo Albanesi ===
- Beniamino Cesi [pupils]
- Norman Fraser
- Mary Lucas
- Lilias Mackinnon
- Meirion Williams

=== Johann Friedrich Alberti ===
this teacher's teachers
Alberti (1642–1710) studied with teachers including Vincenzo Albrici and Werner Fabricius.
- Georg Friedrich Kauffmann

=== Johann Georg Albrechtsberger ===
this teacher's teachers
Albrechtsberger (1736–1809) studied with teachers including Georg Matthias Monn and Leopold Pittner.
- Ludwig van Beethoven [pupils]
- Antonio Casimir Cartellieri
- Joseph Leopold Eybler
- John Field [pupils]
- János Fusz [pupils]
- Johann Nepomuk Hummel [pupils]
- Friedrich Kalkbrenner
- Ignaz Moscheles [pupils]
- Franz Xaver Wolfgang Mozart [pupils]
- Johann Peter Pixis [pupils]
- Anton Reicha [pupils]
- Ferdinand Ries [pupils]
- Ignaz von Seyfried [pupils]
- Johannes Matthias Sperger
- Ludwig-Wilhelm Tepper de Ferguson
- Joseph Weigl
- Anton Wranitzky

=== Vincenzo Albrici ===
this teacher's teachers
Albrici (1631 – 1695/1696) studied with teachers including Giacomo Carissimi.
- Johann Friedrich Alberti [pupils]
- Johann Kuhnau [pupils]

=== William Albright ===
this teacher's teachers
Albright (1944 – 1998) studied with teachers including Hugh Aitken, Leslie Bassett, Max Deutsch, Ross Lee Finney, Michael Kurek, Marilyn Mason, Olivier Messiaen, and George Rochberg.
- Derek Bermel
- John Burke
- Evan Chambers [pupils]
- Gabriela Lena Frank
- Alexander Frey
- Evan Hause
- Chihchun Chi-sun Lee
- John Howell Morrison
- Carter Pann [pupils]
- Frank Ticheli
- Michael Sidney Timpson

=== Walter Galpin Alcock ===
this teacher's teachers
Alcock (1861–1947) studied with teachers including John Stainer and Arthur Sullivan.
- Edward Bairstow [pupils]
- Ralph Downes
- Bernard Shore [pupils]
- S. Drummond Wolff [pupils]

=== Putnam Aldrich ===
this teacher's teachers
Aldrich (1904–1975) studied with teachers including Wanda Landowska and Tobias Matthay.
- Daniel Pinkham

=== Amanda Christina Elizabeth Aldridge ===
this teacher's teachers
Aldridge (1866–1956) studied with teachers including Jenny Lind.
- Marian Anderson
- Lawrence Brown
- Roland Hayes
- Paul Robeson

=== Arthur Alexander ===
this teacher's teachers
Alexander (1891–1969) studied with teachers including Frederick Corder and Tobias Matthay.
- Malcolm Binns
- Ruth Gipps
- Thea King
- John Longmire
- Elizabeth Maconchy [pupils]
- Helen Perkin
- Mervyn Roberts
- Freda Swain
- John Tilbury
- John White

=== Charles-Valentin Alkan ===
this teacher's teachers
Alkan (1813–1888) studied with teachers including Pierre-Joseph-Guillaume Zimmermann.
- Ignacio Cervantes [pupils]
- Élie-Miriam Delaborde

=== Joe Allard ===
- Richard Tabnik

=== Basil Allchin ===
this teacher's teachers
Alchin (1878–1957) studied with teachers including Walford Davies, Walter, Parratt Herbert, Sharpe Charles Villiers, and Stanford .
- Barbara Cass-Beggs
- Robert Still
- William Walton

=== Hugh Allen ===
this teacher's teachers
Allen (1869–1946) studied with teachers including unknown .
- Adrian Boult [pupils]
- John Cook
- Keith Falkner
- Robin Field
- Reginald Jacques
- Kenneth V. Jones
- Neville Marriner
- Herbert Murrill
- William Walton
- Guy Warrack

=== Pedro Humberto Allende ===
- Juan Allende-Blin
- Juan Orrego-Salas [pupils]

=== Julius Alsleben ===
this teacher's teachers
Alsleben studied with teachers including Siegfried Dehn.
- Wilhelm Middelschulte [pupils]

=== Johann Christoph Altnickol ===
- Johann Ernst Altenburg

=== Javier Álvarez ===
this teacher's teachers
Álvarez (b. 1956) studied with teachers including Mario Lavista.
- Jörgen Dafgård

=== William Alwyn ===
this teacher's teachers
Alwyn (1905–1985) studied with teachers including John Blackwood McEwen, Edward Morton, Leo Livens, William Wallace, and Daniel Sykes Wood.
- Jeremy Dale Roberts [pupils]
- Geoffrey Grey
- Iain Hamilton [pupils]
- Michael Stockwin Howard
- Robert Sherlaw Johnson
- Minna Keal
- John Manduell [pupils]
- Denis Matthews
- King Palmer
- Francis Routh

=== August Ferdinand Anacker ===
this teacher's teachers
Anacker (1790–1854) studied with teachers including Johann Gottfried Schicht and Friedrich Schneider.
- K. F. Brendel
- Reinhold Finsterbusch
- Eduard Stein [pupils]
- Robert Volkmann [pupils]

=== Jorge Anckermann ===
- Eduardo Sánchez de Fuentes

=== Julian Anderson ===
this teacher's teachers
Anderson (b. 1967) studied with teachers including Alexander Goehr, John Lambert, and Tristan Murail.
- Mark Bowden
- Edmund Finnis
- Helen Grime
- Emily Hall
- Ulrich Kreppein
- Christopher Mayo
- Karola Obermueller
- Elizabeth Ogonek
- Mark Simpson
- Chris Trapani
- Bert Van Herck
- Huw Watkins

=== Johann Anton André ===
- Heinrich Henkel [pupils]
- Aloys Schmitt [pupils]

=== Volkmar Andreae ===
this teacher's teachers
Andreae (1879–1962) studied with teachers including Fritz Brun, Friedrich_Wilhelm Franke, Isidor Seiss, and Franz Wüllner.
- Adrian Aeschbacher
- Conrad Beck
- Ingolf Dahl [pupils]
- Hermann Haller

=== Mihail Andricu ===
this teacher's teachers
Andricu (1894–1974) studied with teachers including Gabriel Fauré, Vincent d'Indy, and Dumitru Georgescu Kiriac.
- Sergiu Natra
- Ștefan Niculescu [pupils]
- Doru Popovici
- Aurel Stroe

=== Hendrik Andriessen ===
this teacher's teachers
H. Andriessen (1892–1981) studied with teachers including Bernard Zweers.
- Jurriaan Andriessen

=== Louis Andriessen ===
this teacher's teachers
L. Andriessen (1939–2021) studied with teachers including Kees van Baaren and Luciano Berio.
- Michel van der Aa
- Martin Arnold
- Richard Ayres
- Richard Baker
- Bára Grímsdóttir
- Oscar Bettison
- Jeffrey Brooks
- Allison Cameron
- Derek Charke
- Marko Ciciliani
- Emily Doolittle
- Michael Fiday
- Graham Fitkin
- Kasia Glowicka
- Michael Zev Gordon
- Jeff Hamburg
- Rozalie Hirs
- Ivana Kiš
- Graeme Koehne
- John Korsrud
- Yannis Kyriakides
- Juan Sebastián Lach Lau
- Pascal Le Boeuf
- Frank P Martinez
- Steve Martland
- Missy Mazzoli
- Joanne Metcalf
- Nathan Michel
- Koji Nakano
- Martijn Padding
- Juliet Palmer
- John Pickard
- Damien Ricketson
- James Rolfe
- Patrick Saint-Denis
- Rodney Sharman
- Ric Sims
- Michael Smetanin
- Paul Steenhuisen
- Calliope Tsoupaki
- Víctor Varela
- António Pinho Vargas
- Jasna Veličković
- Lotta Wennäkoski
- Julia Wolfe
- Sinta Wullur
- Ye Xiaogang
- Jay Alan Yim
- Kristoffer Zegers

=== Pasquale Anfossi ===
- Joseph Mazzinghi

=== Domenico Annibali ===
- Timofiy Bilohradsky

=== Conrad Ansorge ===
this teacher's teachers
Ansorge (1862–1930) studied with teachers including Franz Liszt.
- Eduard Erdmann [pupils]
- Wilhelm Furtwängler
- Alice Herz-Sommer
- Selim Palmgren
- Kurt Schindler
- James Simon

=== George Antheil ===
this teacher's teachers
Antheil (1900–1959) studied with teachers including Ernest Bloch and Constantin Sternberg.
- Henry Brant
- Benjamin Lees
- Ruth White

=== Alfredo Antonini ===
this teacher's teachers
Antonini (1901–1983) studied with teachers including Arturo Toscanini.
- no pupils

=== Giuseppe Aprile ===
this teacher's teachers
Aprile (1731–1813) studied with teachers including Gregorio Sciroli.
- Domenico Cimarosa
- Emma, Lady Hamilton
- Michael Kelly

=== Violet Archer ===
- Larry Austin [pupils]

=== Bülent Arel ===
- Frederick Bianchi
- Conrad Cummings
- Joël-François Durand
- Anne LeBaron
- Jing Jing Luo
- João Pedro Oliviera [pupils]
- Elizabeth Hoffman
- Daria Semegen [pupils]

=== Anton Arensky ===
this teacher's teachers
Arensky (1861–1906) studied with teachers including Nikolai Rimsky-Korsakov.
- Modest Altschuler
- Georgi Conus [pupils]
- Julius Conus
- Lev Conus
- Reinhold Glière [pupils]
- Alexander Gretchaninov
- Thomas de Hartmann
- Paul Juon [pupils]
- Max Persin
- Sergei Rachmaninoff [pupils]
- Alexander Scriabin [pupils]

=== Dominick Argento ===
this teacher's teachers
Argento (born 1927) studied with teachers including Luigi Dallapiccola, Howard Hanson, Alan Hovhaness, Bernard Rogers, and Hugo Weisgall.
- Carol E. Barnett
- Leonard Danek
- Frank Felice
- Donald Keats [pupils]
- Juliana Hall [pupils]
- Richard Hillert
- Libby Larsen
- Richard Marriott
- Arthur Maud
- Stephen Paulus
- Paul Reller
- Eric Stokes [pupils]
- David Evan Thomas

=== Carl Armbrust ===
- José Manuel Jiménez Berroa
- Alfred Sittard

=== Thomas Armstrong ===
- Anthony Hedges
- Michael Hurd
- Harrison Oxley
- John Veale
- Eric Wetherell
- Allan Wicks

=== Michael Arne ===
- Michael Kelly

=== Richard Arnell ===
this teacher's teachers
Arnell (1917-2009) studied with teachers including John Ireland.
- David Hewson
- Peter Tahourdin
- Christopher Wright

=== Simha Arom ===
this teacher's teachers
Arom (born 1930) studied with teachers including Jean Devémy.
- Michael Tenzer [pupils]

=== Claudio Arrau ===
this teacher's teachers
Arrau (1903–1991) studied with teachers including Martin Krause.
- Roberto Bravo
- Ena Bronstein-Barton
- Stephen Drury
- Roberto Eyzaguirre
- Edith Fischer
- Ingeborg Gordin
- Karlrobert Kreiten
- Bennett Lerner
- Inés Leyva
- Pilar Leyva
- Philip Lorenz
- Ruth Nye
- Garrick Ohlsson
- David Lively
- Rosalina Sackstein
- James Tocco
- Brigitte Wild

=== Désirée Artôt ===
this teacher's teachers
Artôt (1835–1907) studied with teachers including Francesco Lamperti and Pauline Viardot.
- Therésè Leschetizkaya-Dolinina

=== Vicente Asencio ===
this teacher's teachers
Asencio (1908-1979) studied with teachers including Frank Marshall, Enric Morera i Viura, Joaquín Turina, and Ernesto Halffter.
- Matilde Salvador i Segarra

=== Vladimir Ashkenazy ===
- Alba Ventura

=== Robert Ashley ===
this teacher's teachers
Ashley (1930–2014) studied with teachers including Ross Lee Finney, Roberto Gerhard, and Wallingford Riegger.
- Beth Anderson
- Kenneth Atchley
- John Bischoff
- Jay Cloidt
- Alex Dea
- Paul DeMarinis
- John Esposito
- Barbara Golden
- Peter Gordon
- Scot Gresham-Lancaster
- Phil Harmonic
- Jill Kroesen
- Frankie Mann
- Maggi Payne [pupils]
- Ann Sandifur [pupils]
- Laetitia Sonami
- Mark Trayle
- "Blue" Gene Tyranny [pupils]
- Rodney Waschka II

=== Bonifazio Asioli ===
this teacher's teachers
Asioli (1769–1832) studied with teachers including Angelo Morigi.
- Cesare Pugni [pupils]

=== Thomas Attwood ===
this teacher's teachers
Attwood (1765-1838) studied with teachers including Wolfgang Amadeus Mozart, James Nares, and Edmund Ayrton.
- George Cooper [pupils]
- John Goss [pupils]
- Henry Hugh Pierson [pupils]
- Thomas Attwood Walmisley [pupils]
- Cipriani Potter [pupils]

=== Daniel Auber ===
this teacher's teachers
Auber (1782–1871) studied with teachers including Luigi Cherubini.
- François Bazin [pupils]

=== Louis Aubert ===
this teacher's teachers
Aubert (1877–1968) studied with teachers including Louis Diémer and Gabriel Fauré.
- Henry Barraud
- Jean-Marie Beaudet
- Jean Berger
- Georges Savaria

=== Tony Aubin ===
this teacher's teachers
Aubin (1907–1981) studied with teachers including Paul Dukas, Noël Gallon, and Philippe Gaubert.
- Olivier Alain
- Garbis Aprikian
- Raynald Arseneault
- Jocelyne Binet
- Jacques Castérède
- Pierre Cochereau
- Marius Constant
- Stanko Horvat
- Ginette Keller
- Tālivaldis Ķeniņš
- Ding Shande
- Yüksel Koptagel
- Toshiro Mayuzumi
- Ron Nelson
- Makoto Shinohara
- Isang Yun [pupils]
- Jeanine Rueff

=== Leopold Auer ===
this teacher's teachers
Auer (1845–1930) studied with teachers including Jakob Dont, Joseph Joachim, and Ridley Kohné.
- Joseph Achron
- Margaret Berson [pupils]
- Leonid Bolotine
- Georges Boulanger
- Raphael Bronstein
- Eddy Brown
- Mischa Elman
- Moritz Frenkel
- Konstanty Gorski [pupils]
- Jascha Heifetz [pupils]
- David Hochstein
- Georg Kulenkampff [pupils]
- Isolde Menges [pupils]
- Nathan Milstein [pupils]
- Emil Młynarski [pupils]
- Kathleen Parlow
- Miron Polyakin
- Simon Pullman
- Benno Rabinof
- Silvestre Revueltas
- Clara Rockmore
- Toscha Seidel
- Boris Sibor [pupils]
- Greta af Sillén Roos
- Jacques Singer
- Oscar Shumsky
- Eva Ruth Spalding
- Paul Stassevitch
- Efrem Zimbalist

=== Larry Austin ===
this teacher's teachers
Austin (born 1930) studied with teachers including Violet Archer, Andrew Imbrie, and Darius Milhaud.
- Beth Anderson
- Rodney Waschka II
- Dary John Mizelle

=== Charles Avison ===
this teacher's teachers
Avison (1709–1770) studied with teachers including Francesco Geminiani.
- William Shield

=== Edmund Ayrton ===
this teacher's teachers
Ayrton (1734-1808) studied with teachers including James Nares.
- Thomas Attwood [pupils]
- William Hawes [pupils]

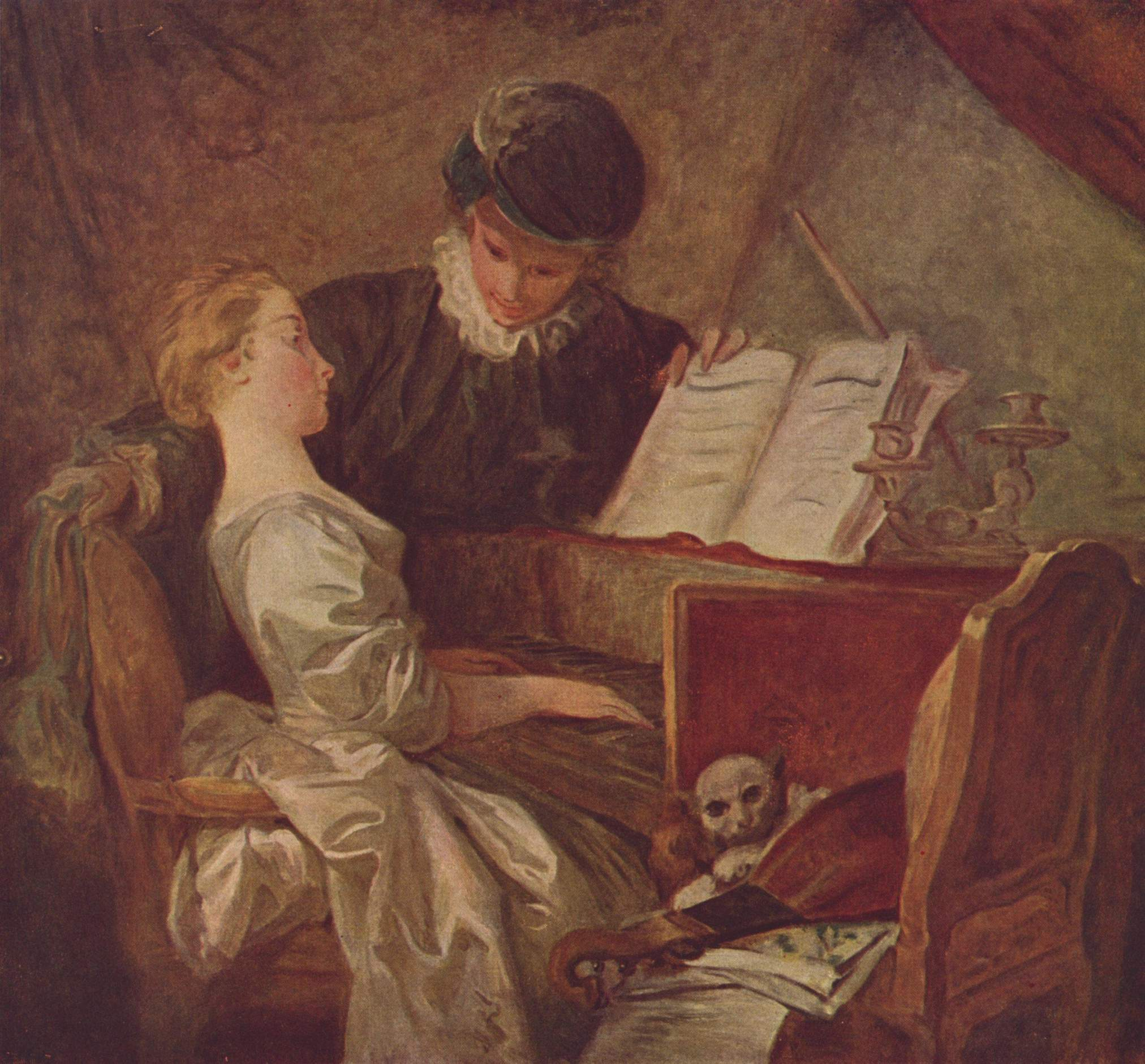

== B ==
=== Kees van Baaren ===
this teacher's teachers
Baaren (1906–1970) studied with teachers including Willem Pijper.
- Gilius van Bergeijk
- Will Eisma
- Louis Andriessen [pupils]
- Reinbert de Leeuw [pupils]
- Misha Mengelberg
- Peter Schat
- Jan van Vlijmen

=== Milton Babbitt ===
this teacher's teachers
Babbitt (1916–2011) studied with teachers including Marion Bauer and Roger Sessions.

Theorists

- Benjamin Boretz [pupils]
- David Lewin [pupils]
- John Rahn

Composers

- Bruce Adolphe [pupils]
- Kati Agocs
- Don Banks
- Harrison Birtwistle [pupils]
- Bruce Brubaker [pupils]
- Benjamin Boretz [pupils]
- Daniel Catán
- Richard Danielpour
- Mario Davidovsky [pupils]
- Michael Dellaira
- Charles Dodge [pupils]
- Edwin Dugger
- John Eaton [pupils]
- David Epstein
- Brian Field
- Jonathan Harvey [pupils]
- John Heiss
- Lejaren Hiller [pupils]
- Sydney Hodkinson [pupils]
- Stanley Jordan (jazz guitarist and composer)
- Laura Karpman
- Michael Kassler
- Paul Lansky [pupils]
- Peter Lieberson
- Donald Martino
- Richard Maxfield [pupils]
- Andrew Mead [pupils]
- John Melby
- Tobias Picker
- James K. Randall [pupils]
- Frederic Rzewski
- Steven Christopher Sacco [pupils]
- Eric Salzman
- Judith Shatin
- Diane Thome [pupils]
- Richard Aaker Trythall

Other

- Stephen Sondheim (theatre composer)
- Godfrey Winham

=== August Wilhelm Bach ===
this teacher's teachers
A. W. Bach (1796–1869) studied with teachers including Carl Friedrich Zelter.
- Carl August Haupt [pupils]
- Gustav Lange
- August Gottfried Ritter [pupils]
- Johann Julius Schneider
- Ferdinand Schultz
- Ludwig Thiele
- Ernst Adolf Wendt

=== Carl Philipp Emanuel Bach ===
this teacher's teachers
C.P.E. Bach (1714–1788) studied with teachers including Johann Sebastian Bach.
- Christian Friedrich Gottlieb Schwenke [pupils]
- Friedrich Wilhelm Rust
- Johann Gottfried Vierling [pupils]
- Johann Friedrich Wilhelm Wenckel

=== Heinrich Bach ===
this teacher's teachers
H. Bach (1615–1692) studied with teachers including Johannes (Hans) Bach and Johannes Bach.
- Johann Christoph Bach
- Johann Michael Bach
- Johann Heinrich Hildebrand [pupils]

=== Johann Christian Bach ===
this teacher's teachers
J.C. Bach (1735–1782) studied with teachers including Johann Sebastian Bach and Giovanni Battista Martini.
- Elizabeth Billington

=== Johann Nikolaus Bach ===
this teacher's teachers
J.N. Bach (1669–1753) studied with teachers including Johann Christoph Bach and Johann Magnus Knüpfer.
- Jakob Adlung [pupils]

=== Johann Sebastian Bach ===
this teacher's teachers
J.S. Bach (1685–1750) studied with teachers including Georg Böhm, his brother Johann Christoph Bach, and Dieterich Buxtehude
- Carl Friedrich Abel
- Johann Friedrich Agricola
- Johann Christoph Altnickol
- Anna Magdalena Bach
- Carl Philipp Emanuel Bach [pupils]
- Gottfried Heinrich Bach
- Johann Bernhard Bach
- Johann Christian Bach [pupils]
- Johann Christoph Friedrich Bach
- Johann Ernst Bach II
- Johann Gottfried Bernhard Bach
- Wilhelm Friedemann Bach [pupils]
- Johann Ludwig Dietel
- Johann Friedrich Doles
- Heinrich Nikolaus Gerber
- Johann Gottlieb Goldberg [pupils]
- Gottfried August Homilius [pupils]
- Johann Peter Kellner [pupils]
- Johann Kirnberger [pupils]
- Johann Christian Kittel [pupils]
- Johann Ludwig Krebs
- Johann Tobias Krebs
- Johann Andreas Kuhnau [pupils]
- Lorenz Christoph Mizler
- Johann Gottfried Müthel
- Christoph Nichelmann
- Johann Schneider
- Johann Martin Schubart
- Johann Friedrich Schweinitz (1708–1780)
- Johann Nikolaus Tischer [pupils]
- Christoph Transchel
- Johann Caspar Vogler
- Johann Gottfried Walther
- Johann Wilhelm
- Johann Heinrich Zang
- Johann Gotthilf Ziegler [pupils] (1715)

=== Wilhelm Friedemann Bach ===
this teacher's teachers
W.F. Bach (1710–1784) studied with teachers including Johann Sebastian Bach.
- Friedrich Wilhelm Rust
- Sara Levy (née Itzig)

=== Oskar Back ===
this teacher's teachers
Back (1879–1963) studied with teachers including Jakob Grün, César Thomson, and Eugène Ysaÿe.
- Will Eisma
- Elisabeth of Bavaria, Queen of the Belgians
- Herman Krebbers [pupils]
- Alma Moodie
- Theo Olof
- Emmy Verhey
- Davina van Wely

=== Agathe Backer Grøndahl ===
this teacher's teachers
Backer Grøndahl (1847–1907) studied with teachers including Hans von Bülow, Halfdan Kjerulf, Theodor Kullak, Ludvig Mathias Lindeman, Franz Liszt, and Richard Wüerst.
- Madame Valborg Collett [pupils]

=== Eva Gancedo ===
· Zeltia Montes

=== Ernst Bacon ===
this teacher's teachers
Bacon (1898–1990) studied with teachers including Ernest Bloch and Alexander Raab.
- Jonathan Elkus
- Carlisle Floyd
- Donald Martino

Henk Badings

- Trisutji Kamal

=== Carl Baermann ===
this teacher's teachers
Baermann (1839–1913) studied with teachers including Peter Cornelius, Franz Lachner, and Franz Liszt.
- Amy Beach
- Frederick Converse [pupils]
- George Copeland
- Bruno Klein [pupils]
- Lee Pattison
- Ludwig Thuille [pupils]

=== Pierre Baillot ===
this teacher's teachers
Baillot (1771–1842) studied with teachers including Giovanni Battista Viotti.
- Charles Auguste de Bériot [pupils]
- Charles Dancla [pupils]
- Narcisse Girard [pupils]
- Paul Guérin [pupils]
- François Habeneck [pupils]
- Victor Magnien [pupils]
- Jean-Pierre Maurin [pupils]
- Jacques Féréol Mazas
- Lambert Joseph Meerts
- André Robberechts [pupils]
- Eugène Sauzay [pupils]
- Waldemar Thrane

=== Simon Bainbridge ===
this teacher's teachers
Bainbridge (born 1952) studied with teachers including John Lambert and Gunther Schuller.
- Christopher Austin
- Luke Bedford
- Oscar Bettison
- Tansy Davies
- Kenneth Hesketh [pupils]
- Joby Talbot
- Sophie Viney

=== Giuseppe Baini ===
this teacher's teachers
Baini (1775–1844) studied with teachers including Giuseppe Jannacconi.
- Salvatore Meluzzi [pupils]
- Cesare de Sanctis [pupils]

=== Edward Bairstow ===
this teacher's teachers
Bairstow (1874–1946) studied with teachers including Walter Galpin Alcock, Frederick Bridge, and John Farmer.
- Ernest Bullock [pupils]
- Cyril Stanley Christopher
- Gerald Finzi
- Richard Hall [pupils]
- Francis Jackson [pupils]
- Elsie Suddaby

=== Claude Baker ===
this teacher's teachers
Baker studied with teachers including Samuel Adler and Warren Benson.
- Andrey Kasparov

=== Julius Baker ===
this teacher's teachers
Baker studied with teachers including Leonardo De Lorenzo and William Kincaid Marcel Tabuteau.
- Jeanne Baxtresser

=== Reginald Tustin Baker ===
this teacher's teachers
R. T. Baker (1900-1966) studied with teachers including Herbert Brewer.
- Ian Kellam [pupils]

=== Mily Balakirev ===
this teacher's teachers
Balakirev (1837-1910) studied with teachers including Alexandre Dubuque and Karl Karlovich Eisrich.
- Semyon Barmotin
- Modest Mussorgsky
- Nikolai Rimsky-Korsakov [pupils]

=== Sergey Balasanian ===
this teacher's teachers
Balasanian (1902-1982) studied with teachers including Dmitry Kabalevsky.
- Nikolai Korndorf [pupils]

=== Claude Balbastre ===
this teacher's teachers
Balbastre (1724–1799) studied with teachers including Pierre Février and Jean-Philippe Rameau.
- Marie Antoinette

=== Artur Balsam ===
- Mina Miller

=== Nikhil Banerjee ===
this teacher's teachers
Banerjee (1931–1986) studied with teachers including Allauddin Khan.
- Paul Dresher

=== Granville Bantock ===
this teacher's teachers
Bantock (1868–1946) studied with teachers including Frederick Corder and Gordon Saunders.
- Anthony Bernard
- Christopher Edmunds [pupils]
- Lilian Elkington
- Eric Fogg
- Julius Harrison
- Dorothy Howell [pupils]
- Frank Mullings
- Clarence Raybould
- Dorothy Silk

=== Charles Barbandt ===
this teacher's teachers
Barbandt (1716–after 1775) studied with teachers including unknown .
- Samuel Webbe [pupils]

=== Samuel Barber ===
this teacher's teachers
Barber (1910–1981) studied with teachers including Rosario Scalero, Richard Stöhr, and Isabelle Vengerova.
- Daniel Pinkham

=== Auguste Barbereau ===
this teacher's teachers
Barbereau (1799–1879) studied with teachers including Anton Reicha.
- Alphonse Duvernoy [pupils]

=== Stanisław Barcewicz ===
this teacher's teachers
Barcewicz (1858–1929) studied with teachers including Jan Hřímalý, Apolinary Kątski, Ferdinand Laub, and Pyotr Ilyich Tchaikovsky.
- Pyotr Stolyarsky [pupils]

=== Woldemar Bargiel ===
this teacher's teachers
Bargiel (1828–1897) studied with teachers including Siegfried Dehn, Niels Gade, Ignaz Moscheles, and Julius Rietz.
- Waldemar von Baußnern
- Leopold Godowsky
- Alexander Ilyinsky
- Paul Juon [pupils]
- Friedrich Koch [pupils]
- Ernst Rudorff [pupils]
- Ernst Wendel

=== Clarence Barlow ===
this teacher's teachers
Barlow studied with teachers including Karlheinz Stockhausen and Bernd Alois Zimmermann.
- Marko Ciciliani
- Georg Hajdu
- Rozalie Hirs
- Juan Sebastián Lach Lau
- Missy Mazzoli
- Harald Muenz
- Gabriel Pareyon
- Patrick Saint-Denis
- Juan María Solare
- Jasna Veličković
- Kristoffer Zegers

=== Joseph Barnby ===
this teacher's teachers
Barnby (1838–1896) studied with teachers including Charles Lucas and Cipriani Potter.
- Alick Maclean

=== Georges Barrère ===
this teacher's teachers
Barrère (1876–1944) studied with teachers including Paul Taffanel.
- William Kincaid [pupils]

=== William Lewis Barrett ===
this teacher's teachers
Barrett (1847–1927) studied with teachers including Richard Shepherd Rockstro.
- Eli Hudson
- Daniel Sykes Wood [pupils]

=== Karl Heinrich Barth ===
this teacher's teachers
Barth (1847 – 1922) studied with teachers including Hans von Bronsart and Carl Tausig.
- Paul Arma
- Arthur Rubinstein
- Heinrich Neuhaus [pupils]
- Wilhelm Kempff [pupils]
- Carl Adolph Preyer
- Rose and Ottilie Sutro

=== Béla Bartók ===
this teacher's teachers
Bartók (1881–1945) studied with teachers including Ernő Dohnányi, Hans von Koessler, and István Thomán.
- Violet Archer [pupils]
- Paul Arma
- Ernő Balogh
- Jack Beeson [pupils]
- Alice Carrard
- Andor Földes
- Ferenc Fricsay
- Laszlo Halasz [pupils]
- Elisabeth Klein
- György Kósa
- Joseph Kosma
- Lili Kraus
- Irén Marik
- Ditta Pásztory-Bartók
- Fritz Reiner [pupils]
- György Sándor [pupils]
- Tibor Serly
- Georg Solti
- Júlia Székely
- Sándor Veress

=== Erasmo Bartolo ===
this teacher's teachers
Bartolo (1606–1656) studied with teachers including G.B. de Bellis.
- Francesco Provenzale [pupils]
- Giovanni Salvatore [pupils]

=== Marmaduke Barton ===
this teacher's teachers
Barton (1865–1938) studied with teachers including John Francis Barnett and Charles Villiers Stanford.
- Henry Ley [pupils]
- Cyril Rootham [pupils]
- Marion Scott

=== Dmitri Bashkirov ===
- Elena Bashkirova [pupils]
- Plamena Mangova [pupils]
- Marta Zabaleta [pupils]
- Alba Ventura

=== Leslie Bassett ===
this teacher's teachers
Bassett (1923–1966) studied with teachers including Nadia Boulanger, Mario Davidovsky, Ross Lee Finney, and Homer Keller.
- William Albright [pupils]
- Lettie Alston
- John Anthony Lennon
- Andy Brick
- John Burke
- Evan Chambers
- Robin Cox
- Sean Hickey
- Gregory Sullivan Isaacs [pupils]
- Mark Kilstofte
- Gabriela Lena Frank
- Joseph Lukasik
- Kevin Malone
- Robert Morris [pupils]
- Russell Peck
- Joseph Pehrson
- Daniel Perlongo [pupils]
- Frank Ticheli
- Richard Toensing
- Gregory Sullivan Isaacs

=== Harold Bauer ===
this teacher's teachers
Harold Bauer (1873–1951) studied with teachers including Ignacy Jan Paderewski.
- John Elvin

=== Marion Bauer ===
this teacher's teachers
Bauer (1882–1955) studied with teachers including Nadia Boulanger, Paul Ertel, André Gedalge, and Walter Henry Rothwell.
- Milton Babbitt [pupils]
- Miriam Gideon
- Maurice Peress
- Julia Frances Smith

=== Julián Bautista ===
this teacher's teachers
Bautista (1901–1961) studied with teachers including Conrado del Campo.
- Alcides Lanza [pupils]

=== Arnold Bax ===
this teacher's teachers
Bax (1883–1953) studied with teachers including Frederick Corder and Tobias Matthay.

=== William Bayley ===
this teacher's teachers
Bayley (1810–1858) studied with teachers including Unknown .
- William Alexander Barratt
- Henry Gadsby [pupils]
- John Stainer [pupils]
- Arthur Sullivan [pupils]

=== François Bazin ===
this teacher's teachers
Bazin (1816–1878) studied with teachers including Daniel Auber, Henri-Montan Berton, and Fromental Halévy.
- Adolphe Danhauser
- Dominique Ducharme
- Émile Durand [pupils]
- Alphonse Duvernoy [pupils]
- Charles Lecocq
- Georges Mathias [pupils]
- Paul Rougnon
- Théodore Salomé
- Joseph Teodore Vilar
- André Wormser

=== Antonio Bazzini ===
this teacher's teachers
Bazzini (1818–1897) studied with teachers including Faustino Camisani.
- Giuseppe Frugatta [pupils]
- Giacomo Puccini [pupils]

=== Robert Beadell ===
this teacher's teachers
Beadell (1925–1994) studied with teachers including Darius Milhaud and Leo Sowerby.
- Eugene O'Brien [pupils]
- Frank Tirro

=== Richard William Beaty ===
this teacher's teachers
Beaty (c.1799–1883) studied with teachers including (unknown) .
- Richard Harrison
- Robert Prescott Stewart [pupils]

=== Franz Ignaz Beck ===
this teacher's teachers
Beck (1734–1809) studied with teachers including Baldassare Galuppi and Johann Stamitz.
- Nicolas-Charles Bochsa [pupils]
- Pierre-Jean Garat
- Pierre Gaveaux

=== Reginald Bedford ===
this teacher's teachers
Bedford (1909–1985) studied with teachers including Lyell Gustin, Percy Grainger, Carl Friedberg, and Robert Casadesus.
- Bob Hahn
- Gordon Hancock
- Elaine Keillor
- Marjan Mozetich

=== Jack Beeson ===
this teacher's teachers
Beeson (1921–2010) studied with teachers including Béla Bartók, Howard Hanson, and Bernard Rogers.
- Mark Birnbaum
- Gloria Coates [pupils]
- Richard Einhorn
- John Heiss
- John Kander
- Phillip Ramey
- Michael Rosenzweig
- Eric Salzman
- Alice Shields
- Bright Sheng
- Harvey Sollberger [pupils]
- Joan Tower [pupils]
- Charles Wuorinen [pupils]
- Judith Lang Zaimont [pupils]

=== Ludwig van Beethoven ===
this teacher's teachers
Beethoven (1770–1827) studied with teachers including Johann Georg Albrechtsberger, Gilles van den Eeden, Joseph Haydn, Christian Gottlob Neefe, Antonio Salieri, and Johann Baptist Schenk.
- Carl Czerny [pupils]
- Dorothea von Ertmann
- Ferdinand Ries [pupils]
- Archduke Rudolph

=== David Behrman ===
this teacher's teachers
D. Behrman (born 1937) studied with teachers including Gordon Mumma, Henri Pousseur, and Karlheinz Stockhausen.
- Jay Cloidt
- Frankie Mann

=== William Henry Bell ===
this teacher's teachers
Bell (1873–1946) studied with teachers including Frederick Corder and Charles Villiers Stanford.
- Hubert du Plessis
- Stefans Grové
- John Joubert [pupils]

=== Vladimir Belov ===
this teacher's teachers
Belov (1906–1989) studied with teachers including Felix Blumenfeld.
- Aleksandr Baltin
- Edison Denisov [pupils]

=== Felix Benda ===
this teacher's teachers
F. Benda (1708–1768) studied with teachers including Bohuslav Matěj Černohorský.
- Josef Mysliveček
- Josef Seger [pupils]

=== Franz Benda ===
this teacher's teachers
Benda (1709–1786) studied with teachers including Johann Georg Pisendel, Carl Heinrich, and Graun .
- Leopold August Abel
- Josef Benda [pupils]
- Josephus Andreas Fodor [pupils]
- Johann Wilhelm Hertel [pupils]
- Leopold Friedrich Raab [pupils]
- Karl Joseph Rodewald
- Friedrich Wilhelm Rust
- Friedrich Ludwig Seidel [pupils]
- Franz Adam Veichtner [pupils]
- Ernst Wilhelm Wolf [pupils]

=== Agostino Bendinelli ===
- Giovanni Maria Bononcini

=== Julius Benedict ===
this teacher's teachers
Benedict (1804–1885) studied with teachers including Johann Nepomuk Hummel and Carl Maria von Weber.
- Theodor Döhler [pupils]
- Frederic Hymen Cowen
- Madeline Schiller [pupils]

=== Orazio Benevoli ===
this teacher's teachers
Benevoli (1605–1672) studied with teachers including Vincenzo Ugolini.
- Ercole Bernabei [pupils]
- Gaetano Carpani [pupils]
- Antimo Liberati [pupils]

=== Paul Ben-Haim ===
this teacher's teachers
Ben-Haim (1897–1984) studied with teachers including Friedrich Klose.
- Tzvi Avni
- Rami Bar-Niv [pupils]
- Eliahu Inbal [pupils]
- Henri Lazarof [pupils]
- Ami Maayani [pupils]
- Ben-Zion Orgad [pupils]
- Shulamit Ran [pupils]
- Noam Sheriff
- Yardena Alotin

=== Arthur Benjamin ===
this teacher's teachers
Benjamin (1893–1960) studied with teachers including Frederic Cliffe, Thomas Dunhill, and Charles Villiers Stanford.
- Stanley Bate
- William Blezard
- Benjamin Britten [pupils]
- David Cox
- Lamar Crowson
- Peggy Glanville-Hicks
- Alun Hoddinott
- Miriam Hyde
- Dorian Le Gallienne
- Natasha Litvin
- Muir Mathieson
- Bernard Stevens [pupils]
- Joan Trimble

=== Frank Bennett ===
- Michael Tenzer [pupils]

=== Richard Rodney Bennett ===
this teacher's teachers
Bennett (1936–2012) studied with teachers including Howard Ferguson, Leonnox Berkeley, and Pierre Boulez.
- Michael Berkeley
- Christopher Bochmann
- Christopher Bowers-Broadbent
- Christopher Gunning
- David Lord
- Dee Palmer
- Paul Patterson
- Tony Russell
- Tim Souster
- Kenny Wheeler

=== William Sterndale Bennett ===
this teacher's teachers
Bennett (1816–1875) studied with teachers including William Crotch, William Henry Holmes, and Cipriani Potter.
- Francis Edward Bache [pupils]
- Frederick Scotson Clark [pupils]
- William Cusins [pupils]
- Florence Ashton Marshall
- Tobias Matthay [pupils]
- Sebastian Bach Mills
- Arthur O'Leary [pupils]
- Hubert Parry [pupils]
- Joseph Parry [pupils]
- W. S. Rockstro [pupils]
- Alice Mary Smith [pupils]
- Charles Steggall
- Arthur Sullivan [pupils]
- Thomas Wingham [pupils]

=== Antonín Bennewitz ===
this teacher's teachers
Bennewitz (1833–1926) studied with teachers including Moritz Mildner.
- Karel Halíř [pupils]
- Karel Hoffmann
- Karel Komzák I
- Franz Lehár
- Oskar Nedbal
- František Ondříček [pupils]
- Otakar Ševčík [pupils]
- Hans Sitt [pupils]
- Josef Suk
- Anton Witek

=== François Benoist ===
this teacher's teachers
Benoist (1794–1878) studied with teachers including Charles Simon Catel.
- Adolphe Adam [pupils]
- Georges Bizet
- Léo Delibes [pupils]
- César Franck [pupils]
- Albert Lavignac [pupils]
- Charles Lecocq
- Louis James Alfred Lefébure-Wely
- Augustine Lorotte [pupils]
- Camille Saint-Saëns [pupils]
- Renaud de Vilbac

=== Peter Benoit ===
this teacher's teachers
1834–1901 studied with teachers including François-Joseph Fétis.
- Frank Van der Stucken

=== Warren Benson ===
- Claude Baker [pupils]
- Carter Pann [pupils]
- Robert Paterson
- Paul Phillips
- Annette LeSiege [pupils] (uncertain)

=== Emerik Beran ===
- Slavko Osterc

=== Charles Auguste de Bériot ===
- Hubert Léonard [pupils]
- Henri Vieuxtemps [pupils]
- Heinrich Wilhelm Ernst

=== Yara Bernette ===
this teacher's teachers
Yara Bernette studied with teachers including Jose Kliass.
- Sylvio Robazzi [pupils]

=== Alban Berg ===
this teacher's teachers
Berg (1885–1935) studied with teachers including Arnold Schoenberg.
- Theodor W. Adorno
- Hans Erich Apostel
- Ross Lee Finney [pupils]
- Jakob Gimpel
- Hans Heimler
- Fritz Heinrich Klein
- Lars-Erik Larsson
- Aron Marko Rothmüller
- Hans J. Salter
- Josef Schmid

=== Arthur Berger ===
this teacher's teachers
Berger (1912–2003) studied with teachers including Nadia Boulanger, Darius Milhaud, and Walter Piston.
- Peter Child
- Gustav Ciamaga
- Seth Cluett
- Charles Dodge
- Daniel Felsenfeld
- Alvin Lucier [pupils]
- Sheila Silver
- Joel Spiegelman
- Richard Wernick [pupils]
- Yehuda Yannay

=== Ludwig Berger ===
- August Wilhelm Bach [pupils]
- Heinrich Dorn [pupils]
- Adolf von Henselt [pupils]
- Fanny Mendelssohn [pupils]
- Felix Mendelssohn [pupils]
- August Gottfried Ritter [pupils]
- Wilhelm Taubert [pupils]

=== Erik Bergman ===
- Heinz Tiessen
- Wladimir Vogel

=== William Bergsma ===
this teacher's teachers
Bergsma (1921–1994) studied with teachers including Howard Hanson and Bernard Rogers.
- Jack Behrens
- Philip Glass
- Karl Korte
- Robert Parris
- Steve Reich
- Marga Richter
- Peter Schickele
- Conrad Susa

=== Oscar Beringer ===
this teacher's teachers
Beringer (1844–1922) studied with teachers including Ignaz Moscheles and Karl Tausig.
- Hubert Bath
- Gordon Bryan
- Winifred Christie
- Ambrose Coviello [pupils]
- Herbert Fryer [pupils]
- Katharine Goodson [pupils]
- Violet Gordon-Woodhouse
- Adolph Hallis
- Cécile Hartog [pupils]
- Lionel Wendt
- Walter Wesché

=== Lennox Berkeley ===
this teacher's teachers
Berkeley (1903–1989) studied with teachers including Nadia Boulanger.
- Richard Rodney Bennett
- Christopher Brown [pupils]
- Geoffrey Burgon
- Francis Burt
- John Manduell [pupils]
- Nicholas Maw [pupils]
- John McLeod
- Adam Pounds
- John Tavener [pupils]

=== Luciano Berio ===
this teacher's teachers
Berio (1925–2003) studied with teachers including Luigi Dallapiccola and Giorgio Federico Ghedini.
- Louis Andriessen [pupils]
- Noah Creshevsky
- Silvana Di Lotti
- Ludovico Einaudi
- Mariano Etkin
- Harold Farberman [pupils]
- Luca Francesconi
- Phil Lesh
- Leon Milo
- Art Murphy
- Bernard Rands [pupils]
- Steve Reich
- Max Richter
- Robert Saxton
- Charles Shere
- Karen Tanaka
- Andrew Thomas
- John Thow

=== Charles-Wilfrid de Bériot ===
this teacher's teachers
Bériot (1833–1914) studied with teachers including Sigismond Thalberg.
- Enrique Granados [pupils]
- Maurice Ravel [pupils]
- Ricardo Viñes [pupils]

=== Hector Berlioz ===
this teacher's teachers
Berlioz (1803–1869) studied with teachers including Jean-François Le Sueur and Anton Reicha.
- Asger Hamerik
- Gustav Roguski

=== Ercole Bernabei ===
this teacher's teachers
Bernabei (1622–1687) studied with teachers including Orazio Benevoli.
- Agostino Steffani

=== Antonio Bernacchi ===
this teacher's teachers
Bernacchi (1685–1756) studied with teachers including Francesco Antonio Pistocchi.
- Farinelli
- Anton Raaff
- Senesino

=== Nicolas Bernier ===
this teacher's teachers
Bernier (1664–1734) studied with teachers including Antonio Caldara.
- André Chéron
- Louis-Claude Daquin
- Jean-Marie Leclair

=== Leonard Bernstein ===
this teacher's teachers
Bernstein (1918–1990) studied with teachers including Helen Coates, Aaron Copland, Heinrich Gebhard, Edward Burlingame Hill, Serge Koussevitzky, Walter Piston, Fritz Reiner, Rosario Scalero, Randall Thompson, and Isabelle Vengerova.
- Marin Alsop
- Piero Bellugi
- Ronald Braunstein
- Herbert Blomstedt
- Duilio Dobrin
- JoAnn Falletta
- Alexander Frey
- Michael Gandolfi
- Paavo Järvi
- John Mauceri
- Paul Phillips
- Helmuth Rilling
- Yutaka Sado
- Elyakum Shapirra
- Jeannette Sorrell
- David Stahl
- Carl St.Clair
- Markus Stenz
- David Torn

=== Martin Berteau ===
- Jean-Pierre Duport [pupils]
- Louis-Charles-Joseph Rey [pupils]

=== Henri Berthelier ===
this teacher's teachers
Berthelier (1856–1918) studied with teachers including Jean-Pierre Maurin.
- Renée Chemet
- Lucien Durosoir
- Georges Frey
- Sigrid Lindberg
- Darius Milhaud [pupils]
- Pierre Monteux [pupils]

=== Henri Bertini ===
this teacher's teachers
Bertini (1798–1876) studied with teachers including unknown .
- Eugenie de Santa Coloma Sourget

=== Henri-Montan Berton ===
this teacher's teachers
Berton (1767–1844) studied with teachers including Louis-Charles-Joseph Rey and Antonio Sacchini.
- François Bazin [pupils]
- Bernhard Crusell
- Charles Gounod [pupils]
- Jean-Georges Kastner [pupils]
- Louis-Barthélémy Pradher [pupils]
- Adolf Schimon

=== Ferdinando Bertoni ===
this teacher's teachers
Bertoni (1725–1813) studied with teachers including Giovanni Battista Martini.
- Giovanni Battista Grazioli
- Andrea Luchesi [pupils]
- Simon Mayr [pupils]
- Gaspare Pacchierotti
- Ferdinando Gasparo Turrini

=== Franz Berwald ===
this teacher's teachers
Berwald (1796–1868) studied with teachers including Édouard Du Puy.
- Christina Nilsson
- Hilda Thegerström [pupils]

=== William Berwald ===
this teacher's teachers
Berwald (1864-1948) studied with teachers including Josef Rheinberger.
- Paul Cooper [pupils]

=== William Thomas Best ===
- George Whiting

=== Carlo Besozzi ===
- Carl Ludwig Matthes [pupils]

=== Philip Bezanson ===
- M. William Karlins [pupils]
- Robert Lombardo [pupils]
- James Yannatos
- Olly Wilson

=== Francesco Bianchi ===
this teacher's teachers
Bianchi (1752–1810) studied with teachers including Pasquale Cafaro and Niccolò Jommelli.
- Henry Bishop [pupils]
- Catterino Cavos [pupils]

=== Franz Bieling ===
- Joseph Ignaz Bieling

=== E. Power Biggs ===
this teacher's teachers
Biggs (1906–1977) studied with teachers including G. D. Cunningham.
- Daniel Pinkham

=== Marie Bigot ===
- Fanny Mendelssohn

=== William Billings ===
- Elisha West

=== Harrison Birtwistle ===
this teacher's teachers
Birtwistle (born 1934) studied with teachers including Milton Babbitt, Richard Hall, Reginald Kell, and Humphrey Procter-Gregg.
- James Ingram
- Dominic Muldowney
- Karola Obermueller

=== Henry Bishop ===
this teacher's teachers
Bishop (1787–1856) studied with teachers including Francesco Bianchi.
- Henry Farmer [pupils]
- George Rodwell

=== Giovanni Ambrogio Bissone ===
this teacher's teachers
G. A. Bissone (1655–1726) studied with teachers including Unknown .
- Francesco Antonio Vallotti [pupils]

=== Giancarlo Bizzi ===
- Giorgio Battistelli

=== Boris Blacher ===
this teacher's teachers
Blacher (1903–1975) studied with teachers including Friedrich Koch.
- Kalevi Aho
- Elaine Barkin
- Herbert Baumann
- Christopher Brown [pupils]
- Francis Burt
- Frank Corcoran [pupils]
- Gottfried von Einem
- Heimo Erbse
- Paul Fetler [pupils]
- Charles Fussell
- Fritz Geißler
- Klaus Huber [pupils]
- Maki Ishii
- Giselher Klebe
- Malcolm Lipkin
- Robert Lombardo [pupils]
- Joel Mandelbaum
- Aribert Reimann
- Noam Sheriff
- Paul Gutama Soegijo
- Richard Aaker Trythall
- Richard Wernick [pupils]
- Isang Yun [pupils]

=== Easley Blackwood ===
this teacher's teachers
Blackwood (born 1933) studied with teachers including Nadia Boulanger, Paul Hindemith, and Olivier Messiaen.
- W. A. Mathieu
- Paul Rapoport
- David O'Fallon

=== Michel Blavet ===
- Félix Rault [pupils]

=== Ernest Bloch ===
this teacher's teachers
Bloch (1880–1959) studied with teachers including Iwan Knorr, Émile Jaques-Dalcroze, Ludwig Thuille, and Eugène Ysaÿe.
- George Antheil [pupils]
- Ernst Bacon [pupils]
- Mark Brunswick
- Richard Cumming
- Ethel Glenn Hier
- Frederick Jacobi [pupils]
- Zoel Parenteau
- Quincy Porter [pupils]
- Vera Nicolaevna Preobrajenska [pupils]
- Bernard Rogers [pupils]
- Roger Sessions [pupils]
- Halsey Stevens [pupils]

=== Joseph Bloch ===
- Emanuel Ax
- Van Cliburn
- Misha Dichter
- Ilona Fehér [pupils]
- Garrick Ohlsson
- Jeffrey Swann

=== Karl-Birger Blomdahl ===
this teacher's teachers
Blomdahl (1916–1968) studied with teachers including Hilding Rosenberg.
- Daniel Börtz

=== Robert Bloom ===
this teacher's teachers
Bloom (1908–1994) studied with teachers including Marcel Tabuteau.
- William Bennett
- Bill Douglas
- Ray Still
- Allan Vogel
- Richard Woodhams

=== John Blow ===
this teacher's teachers
Blow (1649–1708) studied with teachers including Henry Cooke, Christopher Gibbons, and John Hingston.
- Jeremiah Clarke [pupils]
- William Croft [pupils]
- Bernard Gates [pupils]
- Henry Purcell [pupils]
- Daniel Roseingrave [pupils]

=== Felix Blumenfeld ===
this teacher's teachers
Blumenfeld (1863–1931) studied with teachers including Nikolai Rimsky-Korsakov, Anton Rubinstein, and Fedor Stein.
- Vladimir Horowitz
- Simon Barere
- Vladimir Belov [pupils]
- Maria Yudina
- Anatole Kitain
- Anna Stolyarevich
- Maria Grinberg

=== Joseph von Blumenthal ===
this teacher's teachers
Blumenthal (1782–1850) studied with teachers including Georg Joseph Vogler.
- Adolf Müller Sr. [pupils]

=== Nicolas-Charles Bochsa ===
this teacher's teachers
Bochsa (1789–1856) studied with teachers including Franz Beck, Charles-Simon Catel, and François Joseph Naderman.
- Elias Parish Alvars
- Théodore Labarre

=== Carl Maria von Bocklet ===
this teacher's teachers
Bocklet (1801–1881) studied with teachers including Bedřich Diviš Weber.
- Louis Köhler [pupils]
- Eduard Marxsen [pupils]
- Johannes Brahms [pupils]

=== Peer Bode ===
- Andrew Deutsch

=== Theobald Boehm ===
- Thomas Mollenhauer

=== Semyon Bogatyrev ===
- Isaak Dunayevsky
- Yuri Kholopov [pupils]

=== Johann Balthasar Böhm ===
this teacher's teachers
B. Böhm (d. 1675) studied with teachers including .
- Georg Böhm [pupils]

=== Georg Böhm ===
this teacher's teachers
G. Böhm (1661–1733) studied with teachers including Johann Balthasar Böhm, highly probably Johann Heinrich Hildebrand, and likely Johann Adam Reincken
- Johann Christian Bach (Erfurt)
- Johann Sebastian Bach [pupils] (probably)

=== Joseph Böhm ===
this teacher's teachers
J. Böhm (1795–1876) studied with teachers including Pierre Rode.
- Sigismund Bachrich
- Jakob Dont [pupils]
- Matthias Durst [pupils]
- Heinrich Wilhelm Ernst
- Heinrich Wilhelm Ernst [pupils]
- Jakob Grün [pupils]
- Carl Heissler [pupils]
- Georg Hellmesberger Sr. [pupils]
- Jenő Hubay [pupils]
- Joseph Joachim [pupils]
- Eduard Rappoldi [pupils]
- Ede Reményi

=== Ferdinand Böhme ===
this teacher's teachers
Böhme (1815–1883) studied with teachers including Moritz Hauptmann, Carl Schmittbach, Louis Spohr, and Carl Friedrich Zöllner.
- William B. Bradbury
- Willem Kes [pupils]
- Cornelis van der Linden

=== François-Adrien Boieldieu ===
this teacher's teachers
Boieldieu (1775–1834) studied with teachers including Charles Broche.
- Adolphe Adam [pupils]
- Victor Dourlen [pupils]
- François-Joseph Fétis [pupils]
- Théodore Labarre [pupils]
- Pierre-Joseph-Guillaume Zimmerman [pupils]

=== William Bolcom ===
this teacher's teachers
Bolcom (born 1938) studied with teachers including Berthe Poncy Jacobson, George Frederick McKay, Olivier Messiaen, Darius Milhaud, and John Verrall.
- Derek Bermel
- Andrew Bishop
- Gabriela Lena Frank
- Kenneth Hesketh [pupils]
- Chihchun Chi-sun Lee
- David T. Little
- Carter Pann [pupils]
- Joel Puckett
- Elena Ruehr
- Felicia Sandler
- Matthew Tommasini

=== Carlos Bonell ===
this teacher's teachers
Bonell (b. 1949) studied with teachers including John Williams.
- Detlev Bork
- Nils Klöfver
- Jakob Lindberg
- Nigel North
- Brad Richter

=== Giuseppe Bonno ===
this teacher's teachers
Bonno (1711–1788) studied with teachers including Francesco Durante, Leonardo Leo, and Johann Georg Reinhardt.
- Carl Ditters von Dittersdorf [pupils]
- Marianna Martines

=== Giovanni Maria Bononcini ===
this teacher's teachers
Bononcini (1642–1678) studied with teachers including Marco Uccellini.
- Antonio Maria Pacchioni [pupils]

=== Josiah Booth ===
- G. D. Cunningham [pupils]
- Charles James Mott

=== Tomás Borba ===
- Rui Coelho
- Ivo Cruz
- Luís de Freitas Branco
- Fernando Lopes-Graça

=== Marco Bordogni ===
- Sophie Cruvelli
- Giovanni Matteo Mario
- Sims Reeves
- Maschinka Schubert
- Anna Thillon

=== Benjamin Boretz ===
this teacher's teachers
Boretz (born 1934) studied with teachers including Milton Babbitt, Lukas Foss, Darius Milhaud, and Roger Sessions.
- Daniel Catán
- John Rahn

=== Giovanni Borghi ===
- Francesco Basili

=== Felix Borowski ===
- Silvestre Revueltas

=== Hélène Boschi ===
this teacher's teachers
Boschi (1917–1990) studied with teachers including Alfred Cortot and Yvonne Lefébure.
- Piotr Anderszewski [pupils]

=== Marco Enrico Bossi ===
this teacher's teachers
Bossi (1861–1925) studied with teachers including Amilcare Ponchielli.
- Alfredo D'Ambrosio
- Giulio Bas
- Giacomo Benvenuti
- Giorgio Federico Ghedini [pupils]
- Gian Francesco Malipiero [pupils]

=== Nadia Boulanger ===
this teacher's teachers
Boulanger (1887–1979) studied with teachers including Gabriel Fauré and André Gedalge.

Neither Boulanger nor Annette Dieudonné, her lifelong friend and assistant, kept a record of every student who studied with Boulanger. In addition, it is virtually impossible to determine the exact nature of an individual's private study with Boulanger. All in all, Boulanger is believed to have taught a very large number of students from Europe, Australia, Mexico, Argentina and Canada, as well as over 600 American musicians.

A

- Douglas Allanbrook
- Martin Amlin
- José Antônio Rezende de Almeida Prado
- Ruth Anderson
- István Anhalt
- Mireya Arboleda [pupils]

B

- Grażyna Bacewicz
- Burt Bacharach
- Daniel Barenboim
- Leslie Bassett [pupils]
- Marion Bauer [pupils]
- Elaine Bearer
- John S. Beckett
- John Beckwith
- Robert Russell Bennett
- Roderic von Bennigsen
- Arthur Berger [pupils]
- Lennox Berkeley [pupils], her first English student
- Herman Berlinski
- Mary Berry
- Vanraj Bhatia
- İdil Biret
- Diane Bish
- Maurice Blackburn
- Easley Blackwood Jr. [pupils]
- Marc Blitzstein
- Cecilia Clare Bocard
- Lili Boulanger
- Damjana Bratuž
- Peter Brewis
- Irene Britton Smith
- Mark Brunswick
- Walter Buczynski
- Donald Byrd

C

- Oleg Caetani
- William Caplin
- Elliott Carter [pupils]
- Alejandro García Caturla
- Francis Chagrin
- Paul Chihara
- John Chowning [pupils]
- William Sloane Coffin
- Robert Cogan
- Joel Cohen
- Marius Constant
- David Conte
- Paul Cooper [pupils]
- Aaron Copland [pupils]
- Jean Coulthard
- Noah Creshevsky
- Tan Crone
- Maria Curcio [pupils]
- Clifford Curzon [pupils]
- Charles Cushing [pupils]
- Gabriel Cusson

D

- Ingolf Dahl [pupils]
- Isabelle Delorme [pupils]
- Kenwood Dennard
- Robert Nathaniel Dett
- Liam Devlin
- David Diamond [pupils]
- Ding Shande
- John Woods Duke

E

- Cecil Effinger
- Herbert Elwell
- Donald Erb [pupils]
- Ulvi Cemal Erkin
- Julio Estrada
- Yona Ettlinger

F

- Armando José Fernandes
- Beatriz Ferreyra
- Scott Fields
- Irving Fine [pupils]
- Ross Lee Finney [pupils]
- Charles Fox
- Arthur Frackenpohl
- Jean Françaix

G

- Rosa García [pupils]
- John Eliot Gardiner
- Kenneth Gilbert
- Egberto Gismonti [pupils]
- Peggy Glanville-Hicks
- Philip Glass
- Richard Franko Goldman
- Jay Gottlieb
- Donald Grantham
- Gigi Gryce
- Gerardo Guevara

H

- Alexei Haieff
- Adolphus Hailstork
- Hermann Haller
- Gerre Hancock
- Donald Harris
- Roy Harris [pupils]
- Eugene Haynes [pupils]
- Pierre Henry
- Peter Hill
- H. Wiley Hitchcock
- Joseph Horovitz [pupils]
- Mary Howe
- Susan Hurley
- Karel Husa

I

- Andrew Imbrie [pupils]

J

- Grant Johannesen
- Isaiah Jackson
- Richard Johnston
- Quincy Jones
- Maurice Journeau

K

- Robert Kapilow
- Vítězslava Kaprálová
- Harrison Kerr
- Hidayat Inayat Khan
- Noor Inayat Khan
- Vilayat Inayat Khan
- Bryan Kelly
- Wojciech Kilar
- John Kirkpatrick
- Ralph Kirkpatrick
- Peter Klatzow [pupils]
- Anna Maria Klechniowska
- Peter Paul Koprowski
- Dina Koston
- Leo Kraft [pupils]
- Zygmunt Krauze
- Gail Kubik
- Johan Kvandal

L

- John Lambert [pupils]
- John La Montaine [pupils]
- Philip Lasser
- Noël Lee
- Denoe Leedy
- Michel Legrand
- Jacques Leguerney
- Leonard Lehrman
- Robert D. Levin
- Gilbert Levine
- Anthony Lewis
- Robert Hall Lewis
- Dee Libbey
- Dinu Lipatti
- Normand Lockwood [pupils]

M

- Fouzieh Majd
- Judith Malafronte
- John Manduell
- Marcelle de Manziarly
- Igor Markevitch
- Sylvia Marlowe
- Roger Matton
- Bernadetta Matuszczak
- Nicholas Maw [pupils]
- Boyd McDonald
- Joyce Mekeel
- Gian Carlo Menotti [pupils]
- Jeremy Menuhin
- Pierre Mercure
- Krzysztof Meyer
- Edward Salim Michael
- Yvar Mikhashoff
- Robert Moevs
- Pierre Mollet
- Marguerite Monnot
- Errol Morris
- Dorothy Rudd Moore
- Douglas Moore
- Thea Musgrave [pupils]
- Zygmunt Mycielski, probably her first Polish student

N

- Émile Naoumoff
- Ginette Neveu
- Per Nørgård [pupils]

O

- Albert Alan Owen

P

- Jean Papineau-Couture
- Alex Panamá
- Thomas Pasatieri
- Don Paterson
- Nikola Petin
- Michel Perrault
- Astor Piazzolla
- Julia Perry
- Daniel Pinkham
- Walter Piston [pupils]
- Manuel M. Ponce
- Anthony Powers
- Lila Pradell
- Marta Ptaszynska

R

- Priaulx Rainier [pupils]
- Joe Raposo
- Irma Ravinale
- Rosette Renshaw
- Willard Rhodes
- John Donald Robb
- Robert Xavier Rodriguez
- Bernard Rogers [pupils]
- José Rolón
- Jean Alain Roussel
- Joseph Willard Roosevelt
- Carol Rosenberger
- Laurence Rosenthal
- Edwin Roxburgh [pupils]

S

- Rico Saccani
- Cláudio Santoro [pupils]
- Allen Sapp
- Avi Schönfeld
- Kazimierz Serocki
- Mordecai Seter [pupils]
- Robert Shafer
- Harold Shapero [pupils]
- Allen Shawn
- Robert Sherlaw Johnson [pupils]
- Verdina Shlonsky [pupils]
- Elie Siegmeister [pupils]
- Kazimierz Sikorski [pupils]
- Malcolm Singer
- Stanisław Skrowaczewski
- Marcelle Soulage
- James Stevens
- Richard Stoker
- Maurine Stuart
- Soulima Stravinsky
- Charles Strouse
- Sidney Sukoenig
- Rodica Sutzu
- Howard Swanson
- Tadeusz Szeligowski [pupils]
- Henryk Szeryng

T

- Louise Talma
- Melvyn Tan
- Nell Tangeman
- Jon Nichimyoun Taylor
- Serge Tcherepnin [pupils]
- Bob Telson
- Virgil Thomson [pupils]
- Michiko Toyama
- Lester Trimble
- David Tunley
- Geirr Tveitt

V

- Jane Vignery

W

- George Theophilus Walker
- David Ward-Steinman
- Elinor Remick Warren
- Beveridge Webster
- Richard Westenburg
- George Balch Wilson
- Antoni Wit
- Phelps D. Witter
- James Wood [pupils]
- Russell Woollen

X

- Stavros Xarchakos

Y

- James Yannatos
- Akio Yashiro [pupils]
- Christopher Yavelow
- Narciso Yepes
- Rolv Yttrehus

Z

- Mirjana Živković
- Ronald Zollman
- Francisco Zumaque

=== Pierre Boulez ===
this teacher's teachers
Boulez (1925–2016) studied with teachers including René Leibowitz and Olivier Messiaen.
- Gilbert Amy
- Charles Ansbacher
- Richard Rodney Bennett
- John Carewe [pupils]
- Jeff Cook
- Marc-André Dalbavie
- Michael Daugherty [pupils]
- Richard Dufallo
- Jean-Claude Éloy
- Serge Garant
- Jacques Guyonnet
- Heinz Holliger
- Hans Ulrich Lehmann
- Jeffrey Means
- Gilberto Mendes
- Henri Pousseur [pupils]
- Grażyna Pstrokońska-Nawratil [pupils]
- Bernard Rands [pupils]
- Robert Rowe
- Serge Tcherepnin [pupils]

=== Adrian Boult ===
this teacher's teachers
Boult (1889–1983) studied with teachers including Hugh Allen.
- Armstrong Gibbs
- Nicholas Cleobury
- Vernon Handley
- Victor Hely-Hutchinson
- Stanford Robinson
- Michael Tippett [pupils]
- Stanley Herbert Wilson
- Barry Wordsworth

=== York Bowen ===
this teacher's teachers
Bowen (1884–1961) studied with teachers including Frederick Corder, Alfred Izard, and Tobias Matthay.
- Myers Foggin
- Derek Holman
- Joan Mary Last
- Charles Lynch
- Ivor Newton
- Kathleen Richards
- Betty Roe
- Leo Rowlands
- Timothy Salter [pupils]
- Constance Warren

=== Armen Boyajian ===
- Marisa Galvany
- Paul Plishka
- Samuel Ramey
- Harry Theyard

=== William Boyce ===
this teacher's teachers
Boyce (1711–1779) studied with teachers including Maurice Greene and Johann Christoph Pepusch.
- Thomas Linley the younger
- Marmaduke Overend

=== Martin Boykan ===
this teacher's teachers
Boykan (1931–2021) studied with teachers including Paul Hindemith and Walter Piston.
- Paul Beaudoin
- Peter Child
- Peter Lieberson
- Steven Mackey
- Marjorie Merryman
- Craig Walsh

=== Johannes Brahms ===
this teacher's teachers
Brahms (1833–1897) studied with teachers including Carl Maria von Bocklet and Eduard Marxsen.
- Gustav Jenner
- William Charles Ernest Seeboeck [pupils]

=== Hans Brandts-Buys ===
- Marius Flothuis

=== Henry Brant ===
- Linda Bouchard
- David A. Jaffe
- Tio Macaro
- Joan Tower

=== Marianne Brandt ===
- Therésè Leschetizkaya-Dolinina

=== Louis Brassin ===
this teacher's teachers
Brassin (1840–1884) studied with teachers including Ignaz Moscheles.
- Arthur De Greef [pupils]
- Paul Ertel [pupils]
- Willem Kes [pupils]
- Gennady Korganov
- James Kwast [pupils]
- Franz Rummel
- Vasily Safonov [pupils]
- Wassily Sapellnikoff
- Edgar Tinel [pupils]
- Alfred Wotquenne

=== Walter Braunfels ===
this teacher's teachers
Braunfels (1882–1954) studied with teachers including James Kwast, Theodor Leschetizky, Felix Mottl, and Ludwig Thuille.
- Paul Baumgartner
- Henriëtte van den Brandeler
- Hermann Schroeder [pupils]
- Reinhard Schwarz-Schilling

=== Alfred Brendel ===
this teacher's teachers
Brendel (1931–2025) studied with teachers including Ludovica von Kaan and Artur Michl.
- Hans-Peter Stenzl
- Volker Stenzl

=== Martin Bresnick ===
this teacher's teachers
Bresnick (born 1946) studied with teachers including John Chowning and György Ligeti.
- Samuel Adams
- Jeffrey Brooks
- Sidney Corbett
- David Feldman
- Michael Gilbertson
- Michael Gordon
- Judd Greenstein
- Juliana Hall
- Nikolas Kompridis
- David Lang
- Carl Schimmel
- Arlene Sierra
- Sarah Kirkland Snider
- Michael Tenzer [pupils]
- Julia Wolfe
- Evan Ziporyn

=== Herbert Brewer ===
this teacher's teachers
Brewer (1879–1941) studied with teachers including Frederick Bridge, Charles Harford Lloyd, Walter Parratt, and Charles Villiers Stanford.
- Reginald Tustin Baker [pupils]
- Ivor Gurney
- Herbert Howells [pupils]
- Ivor Novello
- Herbert Sumsion [pupils]

=== Frank Bridge ===
this teacher's teachers
Bridge (1879–1941) studied with teachers including Hubert Parry and Charles Villiers Stanford.
- Benjamin Britten [pupils]
- Harold Darke [pupils]

=== Frederick Bridge ===
this teacher's teachers
Bridge (1844–1924) studied with teachers including George Elvey, John Goss, and John Hopkins.
- Edward Bairstow [pupils]
- Arthur Benjamin [pupils]
- Herbert Brewer [pupils]
- Arnold Dolmetsch
- Noel Gay
- Lloyd Powell
- Landon Ronald
- Herbert Sharpe [pupils]
- Frank Tapp
- Bryceson Treharne [pupils]
- Henry Davan Wetton
- Mary Wurm
- John Ebenezer West

=== Richard Brind ===
- Maurice Greene [pupils]

=== Benjamin Britten ===
this teacher's teachers
Britten (1913-1976) studied with teachers including Arthur Benjamin, Frank Bridge, and John Ireland.
- Arthur Oldham

=== José Brocá ===
this teacher's teachers
Brocá (1805-1882) studied with teachers including Dionisio Aguado.
- Felip Pedrell [pupils]
- José Ferrer

=== Charles Broche ===
this teacher's teachers
Broche (1752–1803) studied with teachers including Charles Desmazures and Giovanni Battista Martin.
- François-Adrien Boieldieu [pupils]

=== Adolph Brodsky ===
this teacher's teachers
Brodsky (1851–1929) studied with teachers including Joseph Hellmesberger Sr..
- Arthur Catterall
- Leonard Hirsch
- Philip Newman
- Naoum Blinder

=== Jascha Brodsky ===
this teacher's teachers
Brodsky (1907–1997) studied with teachers including Lucien Capet and Efrem Zimbalist.
- Joey Corpus
- Joseph de Pasquale
- Hilary Hahn
- Judith Ingolfsson
- Leila Josefowicz
- Chin Kim

=== Moritz Brosig ===
- Salomon Jadassohn [pupils]
- Hermann Scholtz

=== Harriet Brower ===
this teacher's teachers
Brower (1869–1928) studied with teachers including Amy Fay.
- Sadie Koninsky

=== Christopher Brown ===
this teacher's teachers
Brown (born 1943) studied with teachers including Lennox Berkeley and Boris Blacher.
- Kit Armstrong
- Michael Easton
- Jonathan Pitkin
- John Webb

=== Earle Brown ===
- George Brunner
- Michael Daugherty [pupils]
- Brian Evans
- Beatriz Ferreyra
- Joe Jones

=== Bruce Brubaker ===
this teacher's teachers
Brubaker (born 1959) studied with teachers including Jacob Lateiner and Milton Babbitt.
- Francesco Tristano Schlimé

=== Max Bruch ===
this teacher's teachers
Bruch (1838–1920) studied with teachers including Ferdinand Hiller and Carl Reinecke.
- Fritz Brase
- Edward Joseph Collins
- Clara Mathilda Faisst
- Paul von Klenau
- Elisabeth Kuyper
- Ernst Mielck
- Ottorino Respighi
- Rudolph Reuter
- Fartein Valen
- Ewald Straesser

=== Anton Bruckner ===
this teacher's teachers
Bruckner (1824–1896) studied with teachers including Simon Sechter.
- Guido Adler [pupils]
- Jan Drozdowski [pupils]
- Camillo (Kamillo) Horn [pupils]
- Émile Jaques-Dalcroze [pupils]
- Friedrich Klose [pupils]
- Joseph Pembaur [pupils]
- Richard Robert [pupils]
- Hans Rott
- Franz Schmidt [pupils]
- Friedrich Spigl
- Josef Vockner

=== Fritz Brun ===
this teacher's teachers
Brun (1878–1959) studied with teachers including Franz Wüllner.
- Volkmar Andreae [pupils]

=== Herbert Brün ===
this teacher's teachers
Brün (1918–2000) studied with teachers including Eli Friedman, Frank Pelleg, and Stefan Wolpe.
- Rick Burkhardt
- Dennis Eberhard
- Chris Granner
- Stuart Saunders Smith

=== Hans Buchner ===
this teacher's teachers
Buchner (1483–1538) studied with teachers including Paul Hofhaimer.
- Fridolin Sicher

=== Dudley Buck ===
this teacher's teachers
Buck (1839–1909) studied with teachers including Louis Plaidy.
- Paul Ambrose
- James Francis Cooke
- William Howland
- William Harold Neidlinger
- Daniel Protheroe
- Harry Rowe Shelley [pupils]
- Charles Sanford Skilton
- Raymond Huntington Woodman

=== Percy Buck ===
this teacher's teachers
Buck (1871–1947) studied with teachers including Francis Davenport, Charles Joseph Frost, Charles Harford Lloyd, Walter Parratt, and Hubert Parry.
- Frank Tapp
- S. Drummond Wolff [pupils]

=== Harold Budd ===
- Peter Garland

=== Ernest Bullock ===
this teacher's teachers
Bullock (1890–1979) studied with teachers including Edward Bairstow.
- Douglas Guest
- Peter Racine Fricker [pupils]
- S. Drummond Wolff [pupils]

=== Hans von Bülow ===
this teacher's teachers
Bülow (1830–1894) studied with teachers including Carl Eberwein, Moritz Hauptmann, Franz Liszt, Henry Litolff, Louis Plaidy, and Friedrich Wieck.
- Agathe Backer Grøndahl [pupils]
- Karl Heinrich Barth [pupils]
- Walter Damrosch
- Asger Hamerik
- Frits Hartvigson [pupils]
- Sophie Menter
- Adolf Mohr
- Cornelius Rübner
- Hermann Scholtz
- Max Schwarz
- José Vianna da Motta

=== Friedrich Burgmüller ===
- Gertrude van den Bergh

=== Adolf Busch ===
this teacher's teachers
Busch (1891–1952) studied with teachers including Willy Hess and Bram Eldering.
- Dea Forsdyke
- Yehudi Menuhin
- Frederick Neumann

=== Alan Bush ===
this teacher's teachers
Bush (1900–1999) studied with teachers including Frederick Corder and Tobias Matthay.
- John Bingham
- Timothy Bowers
- Hubert du Plessis
- David Gow
- Edward Gregson
- Hafliði Hallgrímsson
- Graham Johnson
- John Joubert [pupils]
- Herbert Murrill
- George Newson
- Michael Nyman
- Roger Steptoe
- E. Florence Whitlock
- Geoffrey Winters

=== Ferruccio Busoni ===
this teacher's teachers
Busoni (1866–1924) studied with teachers including Salomon Jadassohn, Wilhelm Mayer, and Carl Reinecke.
- Guido Agosti [pupils]
- Maud Allan (the noted dancer)
- Gregor Beklemischeff
- Alexander Brailowsky
- Winifred Burston
- Augusta Cottlow
- Natalie Curtis
- Theophil Demetriescu
- Woldemar Freeman
- Ignaz Friedman [pupils]
- Herbert Fryer [pupils]
- Gottfried Galston
- Rudolph Ganz
- Stanley Gardner
- Aurelio Giorni
- Percy Grainger [pupils]
- Louis Gruenberg
- Guido Guerrini
- Philipp Jarnach [pupils]
- Leo Kestenberg
- Frederick Loewe
- Otto Luening [pupils]
- Dimitri Mitropoulos
- Selim Palmgren
- Egon Petri [pupils]
- Lloyd Powell
- Beryl Rubinstein
- Gisella Selden-Goth
- Leo Sirota
- Svetislav Stančić
- Eduard Steuermann [pupils]
- Theodor Szántó
- Gino Tagliapietra
- Dimitri Tiomkin
- Józef Turczyński [pupils]
- Edgard Varèse [pupils]
- Wladimir Vogel [pupils]
- Kurt Weill
- Edward Weiss
- Stefan Wolpe [pupils]
- Michael von Zadora

=== Henri Büsser ===
this teacher's teachers
Büsser (1872–1973) studied with teachers including César Franck and Ernest Guiraud.
- Henri Challan [pupils]
- Jean-Michel Damase
- Henri Dutilleux [pupils]
- Rolande Falcinelli [pupils]
- Raymond Gallois-Montbrun [pupils]
- Tomojirō Ikenouchi [pupils]

=== Ludwig Bussler ===
this teacher's teachers
Bussler (1838–1900) studied with teachers including Siegfried Dehn and Wilhelm Friedrich Wieprecht.
- Alfred Edward Moffat
- Feliks Nowowiejski
- Kurt Schindler

=== Arthur Butterworth ===
this teacher's teachers
Butterworth (1923–2014) studied with teachers including Richard Hall.
- David Jennings

=== Dieterich Buxtehude ===
this teacher's teachers
Buxtehude (c. 1637/1639 – 1707) studied with teachers including Johann Theile.
- Nicolaus Bruhns

=== William Byrd ===
- Thomas Morley

== See also ==
- List of former students of the Conservatoire de Paris
