= Vladimir Belov =

Vladimir Belov may refer to:

- Vladimir Belov (pianist) (1906–1989), Russian pianist and teacher
- Vladimir Belov (speed skater) (born 1954), Russian speedskater, #1 on the Adelskalender in 1978–79
- Vladimir Belov (soldier) (born 1955), Russian lieutenant-colonel and Hero of Russia
- Vladimir Belov (handballer) (1958–2016), Russian handball player
- Vladimir Belov (chess player) (born 1984), Russian chess grandmaster
- Vladimir Belov (serial killer) (born 1972), Soviet-Russian brigand and serial killer

== See also ==
- Belov, surname
