= Cypress String Quartet =

The Cypress String Quartet was a professional classical chamber music ensemble founded in San Francisco, California, in 1996. At the time of its disbanding in June 2016, the quartet's members were:

- Cecily Ward, violin (founder)
- Tom Stone, violin (founder)
- Ethan Filner, viola (joined in June 2001)
- Jennifer Kloetzel, cello (founder)

The quartet maintained a busy performing, recording, teaching, and touring schedule, traveling approximately 100 days each year throughout much of the United States and internationally with occasional concert tours in Mexico, Canada, England, France, Italy, Germany, Austria, and Japan. The Cypress was Quartet-in-Residence at San Jose State University from 2003 to 2009.

== Recordings ==
Commercial recordings include:

- "Brahms: String Sextets with Barry Shiffman, viola and Zuill Bailey, cello" (released in January 2017 on AVIE Records)
- "Beethoven: The Late String Quartets" (reissued in May 2016 on AVIE Records)
- "Beethoven: The Early String Quartets" ( released in May 2016 on AVIE Records)
- "Beethoven: The Middle String Quartets" (released in November 2014 on AVIE Records)
- "Schubert: Cello Quintet and Quartettsatz" (released May 2014 on AVIE Records)
- "The American Album" (reissue in 2013 on AVIE Records)
- "Dvorak: Cypresses & Op.106" (released February 2013 on AVIE Records)
- "Beethoven: The Late String Quartets" (3-disc set released March 2012)
- "Beethoven Late Quartets, Volume 3" (released March 2012 by the Cypress)
- "The American Album" (released November 2011 by the Cypress)
- "The 15th Anniversary Album" (released October 2011 by the Cypress)
- "Beethoven Late Quartets, Volume 2" (released August 2010 by the Cypress)
- "How She Danced: String Quartets of Elena Ruehr" (released independently in February 2010 on the Cypress's own label)
- "Beethoven Late Quartets, Volume 1" (released in August 2009 by the Cypress)
- "Benjamin Lees: String Quartets Nos.1, 5 and 6" (released in July 2009 on the Naxos label).

Other recordings released by the Cypress Quartet include:

- Jennifer Higdon (Naxos 2008) - featuring 2003 Call & Response/Cypress String Quartet commission "Impressions"
- Jay Cloidt (MinMax 2007) - "Spectral Evidence" featuring "eleven windows" and "Spectral Evidence" for String Quartet
- "Debussy, Suk & Cotton" - featuring String Quartet No.1 by 2004 Call & Response composer Jeffery Cotton
- "Trilogy" (Summit 2004) - featuring music by 2007 Call & Response composer Daniel Asia (including his String Quartet No.2 (composed in 1985 and premiered by the Cypress Quartet in 2003)
- "Haydn, Ravel & Schulhoff" (2002) - featuring "Five Pieces for String Quartet" by the German composer Ervin Schulhoff whose music was lost and/or shunned for decades following his death in a Nazi concentration camp in World War II—by the East because of his so-called "degenerate" harmonies (influenced by Jazz music) and by the West because of his ardent communism (having set the Communist Manifesto for multiple orchestras and choirs). Currently Out of Print.
- "Call & Response 2000 - Live" (2001) - featuring a live concert recording of the inaugural Call & Response program including "quartetto ricercare" by Dan Coleman. Currently Out of Print.

== Call and Response ==
"Call & Response" is an annual commissioning and audience development program created by the Cypress Quartet as a method of demonstrating to contemporary audiences the ongoing process of inspiration, and to help make clear the relevance of older music to today's culture and society. The 2010 Call & Response program (the 11th consecutive year of the project) saw the World Premiere of Elena Ruehr's "Bel Canto" string quartet based on the novel of the same name by Ann Patchett. With the theme of the 2010 Call & Response program "Lyrical Music Inspired by Literature," Dr. Ruehr's new work was paired with Mozart's String Quartet in D Major K.575 "The Violet" and Schubert's String Quartet in D Minor D.810 "Death & The Maiden." The 2010 concert took place at Herbst Theatre in San Francisco's Civic Center district (for the second year in a row; the first 9 occasions of Call & Response were presented at the Yerba Buena Center for the Arts FORUM Theater, and was attended by over 500 people, 200 of which were middle and high school students who had heard the Cypress Quartet perform excerpts of the program in their classrooms during outreach activities in the weeks leading up to the public performance on February 26, 2010.

Previous Call & Response programs have involved the commission of new works from the following composers:

- Dan Coleman (2016)
- Philippe Hersant (2015)
- George Tsontakis (2014)
- Jennifer Higdon (2013)
- Philippe Hersant (2012)
- Jeffery Cotton (2011)
- Elena Ruehr (2010)
- Kevin Puts (2009)
- Kurt Rohde (2008)
- Daniel Asia (2007)
- George Tsontakis (2006)
- Elena Ruehr (2005)
- Jeffery Cotton (2004)
- Jennifer Higdon (2003)
- Benjamin Lees (2002)
- Anna Weesner (2001)
- Dan Coleman (2000, 2016)
