= Lesiège =

Lesiège, LeSiège, Lesiege or LeSiege is a French surname. Notable people with the surname include:

- Alexandre Lesiège (born 1975), a Canadian chess player
- Annette LeSiege (1947–2012), an American composer and teacher
