= Clare Shore =

American singer, conductor and composer

Clare Shore (born 1954) is an American composer, music educator mezzo-soprano, and conductor.

== Biography ==
Clare Shore studied composition with Annette LeSiege, voice with Donald Hoirup, and oboe and saxophone with Davidson Burgess, graduating with a Bachelor of Arts degree from Wake Forest University in 1976. She continued her studies in composition with Charles Eakin and Cecil Effinger, and voice with Louis Cunningham, graduating with a Master of Music degree in 1977 from the University of Colorado at Boulder. She studied with David Diamond, Vincent Persichetti, Roger Sessions, and later with Gunther Schuller and was the second woman to earn a Doctor of Musical Arts degree in composition from the Juilliard School in 1984. She was awarded a prestigious fellowship to MacDowell, and was in residence there in 1985.

In addition to her work as a composer, Shore has taught music at The Juilliard School, Fordham University, Manhattan School of Music, the University of Virginia, George Mason University and Palm Beach Atlantic University. Her compositions have been performed internationally. She resides in West Palm Beach, Florida.

== Honors and awards ==
- Irving Berlin Fellowship in Memory of Jerome Kern
- Alexandre Gretchaninov Memorial Award
- Grant to Young Composers 1983
- ASCAP Standard Awards since 1982
- Composers Assistance Grants from the American Music Center
- MacDowell Colony Fellowship
- Atlantic Center for the Arts fellowship
- Artist-in-Education Grant from the Virginia Commission for the Arts
- Contemporary Record Society grant
- Composer Fellowship from the National Endowment for the Arts

== Works ==
Shore composes for orchestra, chamber ensemble, choral performance and solo voice. Her work Noah's Ark has been described as "fun and dramatic." Selected works include:

- Concerto for Bassoon and String Orchestra, 1985
- Intermezzo, 1984
- Angels from the Sand for Violin, Guitar and Horn in F, 1993
- Brass Quintet, 1985
- Canonic Polemic for Clarinet, 'Cello and Piano, 1985
- Cool Spring Meditations for Guitar, 1987
- Cycle de Vie for Bassoon and String Quartet, 1989
- Four Dickinson Songs for Soprano and Woodwind Quintet, 1982
- Game Piece #1 for Brass Quintet
- July Remembrances for Soprano and Chamber Orchestra, 1981
- Les Soeurs for Flute and Bassoon
- Maya's Song for Mezzo-soprano, Synth. & Perc. (text by Maya Angelou) 1988
- Nightwatch for Woodwind Quintet, 1983
- Oatlands Sketches for Organ, 1986
- Prelude and Variations for Piano, 1981
- Queen Esther for B♭ Clarinet, Narrator and Dancer
- Rebecca's Gift for Violin, 'Cello and Piano
- Rondo for Bells (4 octave set) 1977
- Rules for Solo Melody Instrument
- Woodwind Quintet, 1978
- Noah's Ark for 4-part speaking chorus and oboe, 1988
- Weltanschauung for solo bassoon, 1976

Shore's works are recorded on the CRS, Owl Recordings, and Opus One labels. Selected recordings include:

- The Prism Orchestra Audio CD (January 1, 1990) Owl Recording, Inc., ASIN: B0000WVWX2
- Nocturnos De La Ventana/July Remembrances Audio CD (April 16, 1995) Owl Recordings, Inc. ASIN: B000009JOU
- Nightwatch, Opus One
- Oatlands Sketches
