= Chihchun Chi-sun Lee =

American classical composer

Chihchun Chi-sun Lee (Chinese: 李志純; Pe̍h-ōe-jī: Lí Chì-sûn; Pinyin: Li Zhìchún, born 1970) is a composer of contemporary classical music. Lee is originally from Kaohsiung, Taiwan, and is currently an invited professor of composition at Ewha Womans University, in Seoul, Korea, She received a doctoral degree from the University of Michigan, two master's degrees from Ohio University, and a bachelor's degree from Soochow University in Taiwan. Her teachers included William Albright, William Bolcom, Bright Sheng, Yen Lu, Mark Phillips, Yann-Jong Hwang and Loong-Hsing Wen. She has previously taught music at Johnson County Community College, Washburn University, Rhodes College, and the University of Michigan, and is currently on the faculty of the University of South Florida.

She has received numerous honors; these include winning the 1st Brandenburg Biennial Composers Competition , the Guggenheim Fellowship, the Harvard Fromm Music Fellowship, Taiwan National Culture and Arts Foundation commissions, Theodore Front Prize from International Alliance for Women in Music, ISCM/League of Composers Competition, International Festival of Women Composers Composition Prize, Florida Artist Enhancement Grant, Arts Council of Hillsborough County Individual Artist Grant, the SCI/ASCAP Student Composer Commission, the Hong Kong Chou Scholarship, the Joyce Dutka Arts Foundation, the "Music Taipei" award, the Fresh Ink Orchestral Composition Competition, the Margaret Blackburn Competition, NACUSA, the Taiwan Environmental Protection Bureau Music Contest, the Taiwan Provincial Music Competition, the Taiwan National Songwriting Prize, a Taiwan International Community Radio grant, and the Taiwan International Young Composers Competition. Some of her most significant premiers have included her Concerto for Zheng in Carnegie Hall, and a concert dedicated to her music in Taiwan National Concert Hall.

Lee's work has been reviewed in Gramophone (08/07) and Preußenspiegel, Brandenburger Wochenblatt (BRAWO), Märkische Allgemeine, and Märkische Allgemeine Brandenburger Stadtkurier from Germany (09/06)
