= Belov =

Belov (Russian: Белов), or Belova (feminine; Белова), is a common Russian surname, derived from the word Bely (белый, meaning "white"). Notable people with the surname include:

People

- Aleksandar Belov (b. 1987), Macedonian singer
- Alexander Belov (1951–1978), Russian basketball player
- Alexander Belov (sergeant) (1923–1980), Soviet army officer and Hero of the Soviet Union
- Alexey Belov (officer) (1909–1992), Soviet army officer and Hero of the Soviet Union
- Fyodor Belov (1920–1979), Soviet army officer and Hero of the Soviet Union
- Grigory Belov (actor) (1895–1965), Soviet actor and People's Artist of the USSR
- Grigory Belov (colonel) (1901–1994), Soviet army officer and Hero of the Soviet Union
- Irina Belova (athlete) (b. 1968), Russian heptathlete
- Ivan Belov (captain) (1906–1944) was a Soviet officer and naval captain
- Ivan Belov (commander) (1893–1938), Soviet army commander
- Ivan Belov (lieutenant) (1915–1941), Soviet army officer and Hero of the Soviet Union
- Katherine Belov (1973), Australian veterinary scientist
- Mikhail Belov (1966), Russian professional football coach and a former player
- Nikolay Belov (wrestler) (1919–1987), Soviet wrestler
- Nikolay Nikanorovich Belov (1896–1941), Soviet general
- Nikolay Vasilyevich Belov (1891–1982), Soviet crystallographer, geochemist, and academician
- Nikolay Belov (sergeant) (1924–1993), Soviet army officer and Full Cavalier of the Order of Glory
- Pavel Belov (colonel-general) (1897–1962), Soviet general, commander of the 61st Army
- Pavel Belov (b. 1977), Russian scientist, metamaterial researcher
- Sergei Belov (1944–2013), Russian basketball player
- Valery Belov (b. 1967), Russian ice hockey player and coach
- Vasily Belov (writer) (1932–2012), Soviet writer
- Vasily Belov (private) (1925–?), Soviet soldier and Hero of the Soviet Union
- Vladimir Belov (pianist) (1906–1989), Russian pianist and teacher
- Vladimir Belov (speed skater) (born 1954), Russian speedskater, #1 on the Adelskalender in 1978–79
- Vladimir Belov (soldier) (born 1955), Russian lieutenant-colonel and Hero of Russia
- Vladimir Belov (handballer) (1958–2016), Russian handball player
- Vladimir Belov (chess player) (born 1984), Russian chess grandmaster
- Vladimir Belov (serial killer) (born 1972), Soviet-Russian brigand and serial killer
- Yevgeny Belov, Russian diplomat and Ambassador of Russia to the CIS
- Yevtikhy Belov (1901–1966), Soviet army officer and Hero of the Soviet Union

Other

- Alexander Belov, a fictional character played by Sergei Bezrukov in a Russian crime miniseries Brigada
- Leonid Belov, fictional Red Army general who appears in Call of Duty: Finest Hour
- Yelena Belova, fictional Russian super spy from Marvel Comics
