= Paul Arma =

Hungarian-French pianist and composer (1905 - 1987)

Paul Arma (Hungarian: Arma Pál, aka Amrusz Pál; né Weisshaus Imre; 22 November 1905 – 28 November 1987) was a Hungarian-French pianist, composer, and ethnomusicologist.

Arma was born in Budapest in 1905. He studied under Béla Bartók from 1920 to 1924 at the Franz Liszt Academy of Music, after which time he toured Europe and America giving concerts and piano recitals. Béla Bartók influenced Arma in his love for folksong and collection. He left Hungary in 1930, eventually settling in Paris in 1933, where he became the piano soloist with Radio Paris. His music is generally characterised by modernist tendencies, although his varied output includes folk song arrangements, film music, popular and patriotic songs, in addition to solo, chamber, orchestral and electronic music.

Arma died in Paris in 1987.

== Selected works ==
- Chants du Silence for voice and piano (1942–44)
- Concerto for string quartet and orchestra (1947)
- Violin Sonata (1949)
- 31 Instantanés for woodwinds, percussion, celesta, xylophone and piano (1951)
- Cantate de la Terre (1952)
- Improvisation, Précédée et Suivie de ses Variations for orchestra and tape (1954)
- Sept Variations Spatiophoniques for tape (1960)
- Chant du Marsouin for solo cello (1961)
- Polydiaphonie for orchestra (1962)
- Structures variées for orchestra (1964)
- Prismes sonores for orchestra (1966)
- Petite Suite for clarinet solo (1967)
- Six Transparences for oboe and string orchestra (1968)
- Résonances for orchestra (1971)
- Deux Résonances for percussion and piano (1972)
- Onze Convergences for string orchestra (1974)
- Six Évolutions for 4 flutes (1975)
- Six Convergences for orchestra (1978)
- Silences and Emergences for string quartet (1979)
- À la Mémoire de Béla Bartók for string orchestra and percussion (1980)
- Deux Regards for violin and piano (1982)
- Deux Images for cello and piano (1982)
