= Lu Yen =

Taiwanese composer (1930–2008)

Lu Yen (Chinese: 盧炎; pinyin: Lú Yán; Wade–Giles: Lu² Yen²; 20 November 1930 – 1 October 2008) was a Chinese-born Taiwanese composer.

== Biography ==
Yen was born in Nanjing, China, and was educated in National Taiwan Normal University, Mannes College, City University of New York, and University of Pennsylvania. He received Taiwan's National Award for the Arts in 1993 and 1998. As a pupil of William Jay Sydeman, Mario Davidovsky, George Rochberg and George Crumb, Lu was well known of his atonal writings combining counterpoint skills. George Rochberg commented that Lu's music "has a unique scent". Lu wrote in his article "My Artistic Journey" that he wished to write "music praising mother nature's great beauty and powers." During 1967–2008, Lu wrote 6 solo instrumental works, 70+ chamber ensemble works (excluding art songs), 5 Chinese chamber works, 16 orchestral works, 1 Chinese orchestra piece, and 11 art songs. Among these works, there was a repeated theme about the sound of bell, which Lu always remembered from his childhood in the Jiangnan region of China. Two biographies were published in Taiwan, Lu Yen: A Cold Fire of Music, written by Taiwanese poet Chen Li (陳黎) in 1997 and A Poetic Journey of Nostalgia, by Canadian-Taiwanese composer Shyh-ji Chew (潘世姬) and Taiwanese composer Janet Jieru Chen (陳玠如) in 2004, both published by Taiwan's China Times Publishing Co. Digitalization data of Lu's art song manuscripts and analytic entries are available at Nation Music Archive and Taiwan Music Center of the National Center for Traditional Arts, Taipei, Taiwan.

Lu died in Taipei, Taiwan. Soochow University (Taipei, Taiwan), where he taught music composition and counterpoint for 30 years, has a memorial room and a growing collection of Lu's manuscripts. Lu's music could be heard in albums published by Music Forum, International Society for Contemporary Music-Taiwan Section, Asian Composers League – Taiwanese Composers Association and National Taiwan Symphony Orchestra.

== Works ==
(title; instrumentation; year & place written)

=== Solo works ===
- Four Preludes for Solo Piano; Piano Solo; 1979, Philadelphia
- Journey for 21-string Guzheng; Guzheng Solo; 1988, Lo-ye Street, Taipei
- Solo Piece for Flute: Thoughts; Flute Solo; 1995, Hsin-dian, Taipei
- Solo Piece for Cello: Song; Cello; 1997, Hsin-dian, Taipei
- Piano Preludes: Romance, Bell; Piano; 1999, Dong-hu, Taipei
- Impromptu for Piano; Piano; 2005, Dong-hu, Taipei

=== Chamber works ===
==== 2 players (also refer to Art songs) ====
- Sonata for Violin and Piano; Violin and Piano; 1971, New York
- Oboe and Percussion; Oboe, Percussion; 1979, Philadelphia
- Duo for Flute and Piano（revision; Flute, Piano; 1981–1982, Soochow University, Taipei
- Percussion and Double Bass; 3 Percussionists and Double Bass; 1985, Lo-ye Street, Taipei
- Piece for Piano Four-Hand; Piano Four-hand; 1987, Fremont, CA, US
- Inner Feelings; Baritone and Percussion; 1995, Hsin-dian, Taipei

==== 3 players ====
- Percussion Trio; 3 Percussionists; 1999, Dong-hu, Taipei

==== 4 players ====
- Quartet 1968; Flute, Piano, Bass Trombone or Tuba, Percussion; 1968, New York
- Quartet 1970; Clarinet, Tuba and 2 Percussionists; 1970, New York
- Quartet 1985 (Two Movements); Clarinet, Violin and Piano Duet; 1985, Lo-ye Street, Taipei
- String Quartet: A Flower on a Rainy Night; String Quartet; 1987, Lo-ye Street, Taipei
- String Quartet 2006; 2 Violins, Viola, Cello;2006, Dong-hu, Taipei

==== 5 and more players ====
- Septet; Flute, Clarinet, Trumpet, Horn, Cello and 2 Percussionists; 1967, New York
- Long Tao Sha (Poem by Li Hou-chu); Flute, Clarinet, Violin, Cello, Percussion, Voice; 1972–1973, New York
- Bamboo and Strings; Bamboo Flute, 2 Erhus, Zhonghu, Daruan and Percussion; 1979, Soochow University, Taipei
- Quintet for Chinese Instruments I; Di, Pipa, Yangchin, Zhonghu and Sheng; 1983, Soochow University, Taipei
- Music for Fifteen Strings; Violin I, Violin II, Viola, Cello, Double Bass, each in three parts; 1988, Roosevelt Road, Taipei
- Quintet for Chinese Instruments II; Di, Erhu, Pipa, Gu-zheng and Percussion; 1991, Tian-mu, Taipei
- Four Luofu Songs (Chamber Ensemble Version); Mezzo Soprano and Chamber Ensemble; 1995, Hsin-dian, Taipei
- Tower in the Woods (Chamber Ensemble Version); Soprano and Chamber Ensemble; 1995, Hsin-dian, Taipei
- Woodwind Quintet; Flute, Oboe, Clarinet, Bassoon, Horn; 1996, Hsin-dian, Taipei
- Quintet for Chinese Instruments: Voyage of a Rainy Port; Di, Erhu, Pipa, Yang-chin and Gu-zheng; 1997, Hsin-dian, Taipei
- Moon (Poem by Hong-hsuan Dai); Flute, Clarinet, Clarinet, Violin, Double Bass, Percussion and Soprano; 1998, Dong-hu, Taipei
- Quintet for Music Forum; 2 Percussionists, Piano, 2 Flutists (Alto and Soprano); 1998, Dong-hu, Taipei
- Imitation of Traditional Songs: Tzueifuguei and Tzaoluopao from Qunqu Opera The Peony Pavilion; Soprano and Chamber Ensemble; 1998, Dong-hu, Taipei
- The Use of a Large Gourd (from Xiaoyaoyou by Chuang Tzu); Mixed Choir accompanied by Chinese Instruments; 2000, Dong-hu, Taipei
- Octet; Flute, Oboe, Trumpet, Trombone, Violin, Viola, Cello, Double Bass; 2003, Dong-hu, Taipei
- Sextet for Chinese Instruments;
- Music Forum Concerto for Two Pianos and Percussion Ensemble; 2 pianos, percussion ensemble; 2006, Dong-hu, Taipei

==== Orchestral works ====
- Memories of Jiangnan (for Small Orchestra); Small Orchestra; 1978–1979, Philadelphia
- Memories of Jiangnan (for Chamber Ensemble); Chamber Orchestra; 1980, Soochow University, Taipei
- Memories of Jiangnan I, II, III (for Orchestra); Orchestra; 1982, Soochow University, Taipei
- Song of Ying-Ying (Epiphyllum) (Tin-o-o Variation)for Orchestra; String Orchestra; 1983, Soochow University, Taipei
- Three Movements for Orchestra; Orchestra; 1985, Lo-ye Street, Taipei
- Fantasy for Orchestra I – Sea Winds and a Singing Voice; Orchestra (triple winds); 1987, Lo-ye Street, Taipei
- Fantasy for Orchestra II – Song of Caressing a Sword; Chorus and Orchestra (triple winds); 1988, Roosevelt Road, Taipei
- Piano Concerto; Piano Solo and Chamber Ensemble; 1995, Hsin-dian, Taipei
- Ode to Centennial of Soochow University; Solo Voices, Chorus and Large Orchestra; 1999, Dong-hu, Taipei
- Fantasy for Orchestra III –Chih-si song; Large Orchestra; 2001, Dong-hu, Taipei
- Taipei Suite; Large Orchestra; 2002, Dong-hu, Taipei
- Taipei Concerto; Flute and String Orchestra; 2003, Dong-hu, Taipei
- Da Yue in Three Movements; Chinese Orchestra; 2004, Dong-hu Taipei
- Taipei Concerto for Flute and String Orchestra; Flute and String Orchestra; 2003, Dong-hu, Taipei
- Piano Concerto; Piano and Orchestra; 2006–2008, Dong-hu, Taipei

==== Art songs ====
- Long Tao Sha (Poem by Li Hou-chu); Flute, Clarinet, Violin, Cello, Percussion, Voice; 1972–1973, New York
- Tower in the Woods (Poem by Hong-hsuan Dai); Soprano and Piano; 1984, Soochow University, Taipei
- Four Luofu Songs; Mezzo Soprano and Piano; 1987–1988, Lo-ye Street, Taipei
  - Beyond Smoke
  - Four Lines in Qingming
  - A Bird Flies By
  - Under the Window;
- Four Luofu Songs (Chamber Ensemble Version); Mezzo Soprano and Chamber Ensemble; 1995, Hsin-dian, Taipei
- Tower in the Woods (Chamber Ensemble Version); Soprano and Chamber Ensemble; 1995, Hsin-dian, Taipei
- Inner Feelings;Baritone and Percussion;1995, Hsin-dian, Taipei
- Furniture Music (Poem by Chen Li); Soprano and Piano; 1998, Dong-hu, Taipei
- Imitation of Traditional Songs:Tzueifuguei and Tzaoluopao from Qunqu Opera The Peony Pavilion; Soprano and Chamber Ensemble; 1998, Dong-hu, Taipei
- Moon (Poem by Hong-hsuan Dai); Flute, Clarinet, Clarinet, Violin, Double Bass, Percussion and Soprano; 1998, Dong-hu, Taipei
- Two Songs of Time: Issa, Postcard for Messiaen (Poems by Chen Li);Soprano and Piano; 1999, Dong-hu, Taipei
- Ode to Centennial of Soochow University; Solo Voices, Chorus and Large Orchestra; 1999, Dong-hu, Taipei
- Love Song to Twin-Brook (Poem by Chien-Lung Lin);Solo Voice (doubled with clarinet, flute, violin or viola) and Piano;1999, Dong-hu, Taipei
- The Use of a Large Gourd (from Xiaoyaoyou by Chuang Tzu);Mixed Choir accompanied by Chinese Instruments; 2001, Dong-hu, Taipei
- The Clown God (Poem by Chien-hua Chen);Voice accompanied by cello; 2003, Dong-hu, Taipei

== Biographical chronology ==
=== Early life in China and Taiwan ===
- 1930(0y)
  - Yen Lu (盧炎) was born in Nanjing, China on November 20. His parents were Gan Lu (盧淦), and Bi-cheng Wang (王碧澄).
- 1937(7y)
  - When Sino-Japanese War began, the Lu's fled to Jiangxi and Sichuan. Yen grew up in Sichuan, where he entered the Christian Shengguang Elementary and Junior High Schools till he was 15 years old.
- 1945(15y)
  - Sino-Japanese War ended and Yen returned to Nanjing. He graduated from junior high school and then entered Soochow's Shengguang Senior High School.
- 1946(16y)
  - Education was suspended due to Malignant Malaria and Gastric ulcer.
- 1947(17y)
  - Applied Nanjing Conservatory of Music in summer but was rejected. He returned to Shengguang Senior High School and started from the first year.
- 1948(18y)
  - Applied Nanjing Conservatory of Music for the second time, and failed again.
- 1949(19y)
  - Visited Taiwan for the first time in life, but returned to Shanghai shortly and then went to Taiwan again.
  - Entered National Taiwan Normal University Department of Music
- 1953(23y)
  - Finished all courses of college, and started a one-year internship in Taoyuan School of Agriculture.
- 1954(24y)
  - Graduated from NTNU with Bachelor of Arts. Started one-year military service.
- 1955(25y)
  - Studied harmony and counterpoint with composer Er-hua Hsiao(蕭而化) while teaching in Taipei Municipal Jianguo High School’s night division.
- 1958(28y)
  - Taught harmony and counterpoint in Taiwan's National Arts School (today's National Taiwan University of Arts) till 1962.

=== Exploration (U.S. Era) ===
- 1963(33y)
  - Traveled on a cargo ship in summer to the U.S. for further studies. Entered Northeast Missouri State University for Master of Music Education program.
- 1965(35y)
  - Gave up master's degree and entered New York's Mannes College of Music, started from undergraduate program, where he majored in music composition, studying with William Sydeman
- 1966(36y)
  - Hospitalized due to Gastrorrhagia, received stomach surgery in Columbia University Hospital.
- 1967(37y)
  - Presented his first music composition, Septet for flute, clarinet, trumpet, horn, cello and two percussion parts.
- 1971(41y)
  - Graduated from Mannes College of Music.
- 1972(42y)
  - Entered City College of New York to study music composition and electronic music with Mario Davidovsky, at the same time worked in Seesaw Music Corp.
  - Started writing song Long Tao Sha with lyrics by an American poet, which was re-written in 1976 with Lee Houchu (李後主)’s poem. This is the first work in Lu's Ancient Chanting Series.
- 1976(46y)
  - Invited by colleague composer Hsu Tsang-houei (許常惠) to teach in Taiwan's Soochow University's Music Department as a visiting professor for one year.
- 1977(47y)
  - Entered University of Pennsylvania graduate program, studying with George Rochberg and George Crumb.
- 1979(49y)
  - Received a master's degree from U.Penn. In the same year, he returned to Taiwan and taught at Soochow University Music Department as a lecturer.

=== Reflection and heart-searching ===
- 1988(58y)
  - Received Taiwan's Golden Tripod Awards with the publication of his Piano Four-Hand, recorded by Lina Yeh and Rolf-Peter Wille.
- 1993(63y)
  - Received Taiwan's Miniarey of Education's 18th National Award for Arts of Taiwan with his Fantasy for Orchestra I – Sea Winds and a Singing Voice.
- 1994(64y)
  - Presented works at Taipei Theater in New York on September 4 with fellow Taiwanese composers.
- 1995(65y)
  - Beyond the Smoke/A Bird Flies By-Lu Yen’s Musical World, a concert featuring Yen Lu's music, was held in Taiwan's National Concert Hall on October 26, presented by Contemporary Chamber Orchestra Taipei, conducted by Chun-Fung Lee(李春峰).
- 1996(66y)
  - Retired from Soochow University and continued to teach as an associate professor.

=== Maturity and freedom ===
- 1998(68y)
  - Received Taiwan's Second National Arts and Cultural Medal.
- 1999(69y)
  - In Forum of Lu Yen’s Music on June 6 at Music Forum Musique Theatre, his Septet, Long Tao Sha, Duet for Flute and Piano, Moon, A Postcard for Messiaen, and Piano Prelude were performed.
- 2000(70y)
  - Concert Parnassus from Lu Yen featuring Yen's 10 art songs was held to celebrate his 70th birthday on January 5, performed by Contemporary Chamber Orchestra Taipei, conducted by Chun-Fung Lee.
- 2002(72y)
  - Received the honor of Chair Professor of Soochow University.
- 2003(73y)
  - Received TECO Award's Music Composition Medal.
  - Song Album of Yen Lu, which contains Four Luofu Songs, Tower in the Woods, and Furniture Music, was published in March, sponsored by Department of Cultural Affairs of Taipei.
  - Tower in the Woods were performed and discussed in Contemporary Music Forum of Yen Lu's Music at Music Forum Musique Theatre.
- 2004(74y)
  - Presented My Artistic Journey in Ethno Music Composition Forum in March.
- 2005(75y)
  - Yen Lu 75 th Birthday Concert was held on November 20 at Music Forum's Recital Hall, in which Four Preludes for Piano (1979), Piano Four-Hand (1987), Two Preludes for Piano (1999), Impromptu for Piano (2005), and Song for Cello (1997) were presented along with students’ music compositions as gifts. Pianists Daming Zhu (諸大明), Lina Yeh (葉綠娜), Rolf-Peter Wille, Mei-Ya Lo (羅玫雅) Hsin-Jung Hsieh (謝欣容), and cellist Hsien-Liang Lien (連憲良) joined this concert.
- 2007(77y)
  - Married for the first time in life, with Ms. Ya-shih (a.k.a. Alice, Su-Chih, Shih-Ya) Cherng.
  - Diagnosed with oral cancer by the end of 2007.
- 2008(78y)
  - Died of oral cancer on October 1.
