= Johann Martin Schubart =

Schubart was a German organist and musical scribe who was an early student of JS Bach

Johann Martin Schubart (1690-1721) was a German organist and musical scribe, best known for his association with Johann Sebastian Bach.

== Early life ==
Schubart was born on 8 March 1690 in Gerabeberg, Thuringia, Germany, the son of miller Otto Schubart.

Schubart's route into music is unknown, but he may have been a student of organist Johann Georg Ahle in Mühlhausen.

== Association with Bach ==
Following Ahle's death, in 1707 Bach was appointed as the Mulhausen organist. This led to Schubart's association with Bach. When Bach moved to the ducal court at Weimar in 1708, Schubart accompanied him, as a member of Bach's household.

== Bach scribe ==
Schubart is the scribe of Bach works formerly attributed to 'Anon. Weimar 1'.

=== Works scribed by Schubart ===
- D-B Mus.ms. 11471/1: "Kaiser": Jesus Christus ist um unser Missetat willen verwundet, Markus-Passion (Passions-Pasticcio), BNB I/K/1; BC D 5a,
- D 5b; BWV deest (Serie II:2), deest (Serie II:3); 500a, 1084, deest (Serie II:4) [Weimar voices: before 1713]
- D-B Mus.ms. 30194, Faszikel 5: D. Buxtehude: Toccata in G-Dur (BuxWV 164)
- D-B Mus.ms. Bach P 59: BWV 185 [14.7.1715]
- D-B Mus.ms. Bach St 1: BWV 162, Weimar version [5.10.1716]
- D-B Mus.ms. Bach St 4: BWV 185 [14.7. 1715; 1715/1716?]
- D-B Mus.ms. Bach St 9: BWV 63; BNB I/An/4, Weimar [25.12.1714]
- B Mus.ms. Bach St 23: BWV 172, Weimar, 1st version [1714]
- D-B Mus.ms. Bach St 47: BWV 182, Weimar version [1714]
- D-B Mus.ms. Bach St 109, Faszikel 1: BWV 12, Weimar version [22.4.1714]
- D-B Mus.ms. Bach St 354: BWV 21, Weimar version [1714]
- D-B Mus.ms. Bach St 377, Faszikel 1: BWV 71 [4.2.1708]
- PL-Kj Mus.ms. Bach St 14, Faszikel 1: BWV 31, Weimar version [21.4.1715]

== Later life ==
When, in 1717, Bach left Weimar for Köthen, Schubart remained in Weimar. He was appointed in Bach's place as the court's chamber musician and organist. He died four years later at age 31. No original works by Schubart are known.
