= Heinrich Henkel (composer) =

German composer

Heinrich Henkel (16 February 1822 – 10 April 1899) was a German composer who studied with Johann Anton André at Offenbach am Main and became a figure of some importance for Mozart research.

He was born in Fulda. In 1860, he founded the predecessor of Frankfurt's municipal music school. Henkel died in Frankfurt am Main.

His brother Georg Andreas Henkel (1805–1871) was also a composer.
