= Susan Hurley (composer) =

American composer

Susan Hurley (born 1946) is an American composer living and working in Los Angeles, California.

Hurley's compositional style is an "unusual, unique voice [and] highly individualistic." Her work "defines [the] two opposing characteristics of the post-minimalist style – lyricism and rhythmic drive . . .” The 1992 piece "Gallery Music for Harp" examples this by engaging the listener with "a strong introductory flourish" developing into "gentle, otherworldly sounds.” This alternation between opposites is observed again in a review of "Vermont Poems" and its harmonic reliance on "shifts between unisons and dissonants"

The range of the instruments used by Hurley is broad, including ancient and subtle instruments such as the clavichord and older compositional vehicles such as the chamber opera. Hurley wrote one such opera based on the lives of Anaïs Nin and Rupert Pole. This was commissioned by Joan Palevsky of Los Angeles. Palevsky had been "instrumental" in securing a transfer of the papers of Anaïs Nin to UCLA. The commission was part of this effort.

Hurley was born in Massachusetts and raised in Vermont.

== Biographical references ==
- "International Encyclopedia of Women Composers," Publisher: Books & Music USA; 2nd edition (June 1987) ISBN 978-0-9617485-2-4
- Composers Forum Biography
- Artist Biography Omstream Publishing
