= Jörgen Dafgård =

Swedish composer

- Born: 27 November 1964 (age 61); Gothenburg, Sweden
- Occupation: Composer
- Known for: Masterprize International Composing Competition
- Notable work: Veils for orchestra
- Website: http://www.jorgendafgard.com/

Jörgen Dafgård (born 27 November 1964 in Gothenburg) is a Swedish composer. He gained international repute in connection with the 2003 Masterprize competition, in which his orchestral work Veils reached the top ten. His compositions have been broadcast on NPR and Classic FM (UK) as well as Scandinavian radio stations such as NRK and Sveriges Radio P2. Dafgård studied composition with Anders Nilsson and Johan Hammerth and later at the Malmö Music Academy with Hans Gefors, Javier Alvarez, Hans Abrahamsen and Kent Olofsson.

== Selected works ==
- Snösmältning för piano (1993)
- Veils for orchestra (1995/2005)
- For the Sleeping – Dream Sonata (1997–1998), for viola and tape.
- String Quartet I (1993–1998)
- Mosaïque Vibrante for orchestra (1999–2000)
- Den gömda musiken for choir, organ and percussion (1999–2000, text: Östen Sjöstrand)
- Wind Quintet (2001–2002)
- Sinfonia No. 1 for orchestra (2003–2004)
- Volo for string orchestra (2004)
- Mosaïque Vibrante (2010)
- Through Fire and Water (2011) for large orchestra
- Esprit (2012)
- Klarinettkonsert (2013)
- Eclipse (Concerto, Violin) (2018)
