= William Lewis Barrett =

English flautist and music teacher

William Lewis Barrett, also W. Lewis Barrett, (1847 – 1927) was a professional flautist and music teacher.

== Early life and education ==
Barrett was born on 4 January 1847 in London. His parents were Mary (née Lewis) and Thomas Barrett, a violinist. His mother was from Dinas Mawddwy, Wales, where he began his education. Barrett then was schooled in Cemmes, Montgomeryshire. He learned to play the flute and violin, having studied the flute under Richard Shepherd Rockstro.

== Career ==
He began his career as a flautist by 1868, playing for the Italian Opera. He later played with the Sacred Harmonic Society, Royal Philharmonic Society, and the Carl Rosa Opera Company, having become the principal flautist. In addition to a number of performances for Queen Victoria, he performed in concerts and music festivals in the United Kingdom, United States, and Canada. D. Emlyn Evans said of his performances, "Those who have heard Mr Barrett's solo work, whether in opera or at festivals, or playing obligato to one of the queens of song on the concert platform, can well understand and endorse Queen Victoria’s appreciation of his quality of tone…"

Between 1883 and 1910, he taught the flute at the Royal College of Music. Barrett was also a composer. He died in London at the Savage Club on 10 January 1927, and was buried in Kensal Rise in northwest London.
