= Oscar Bettison =

British/American composer

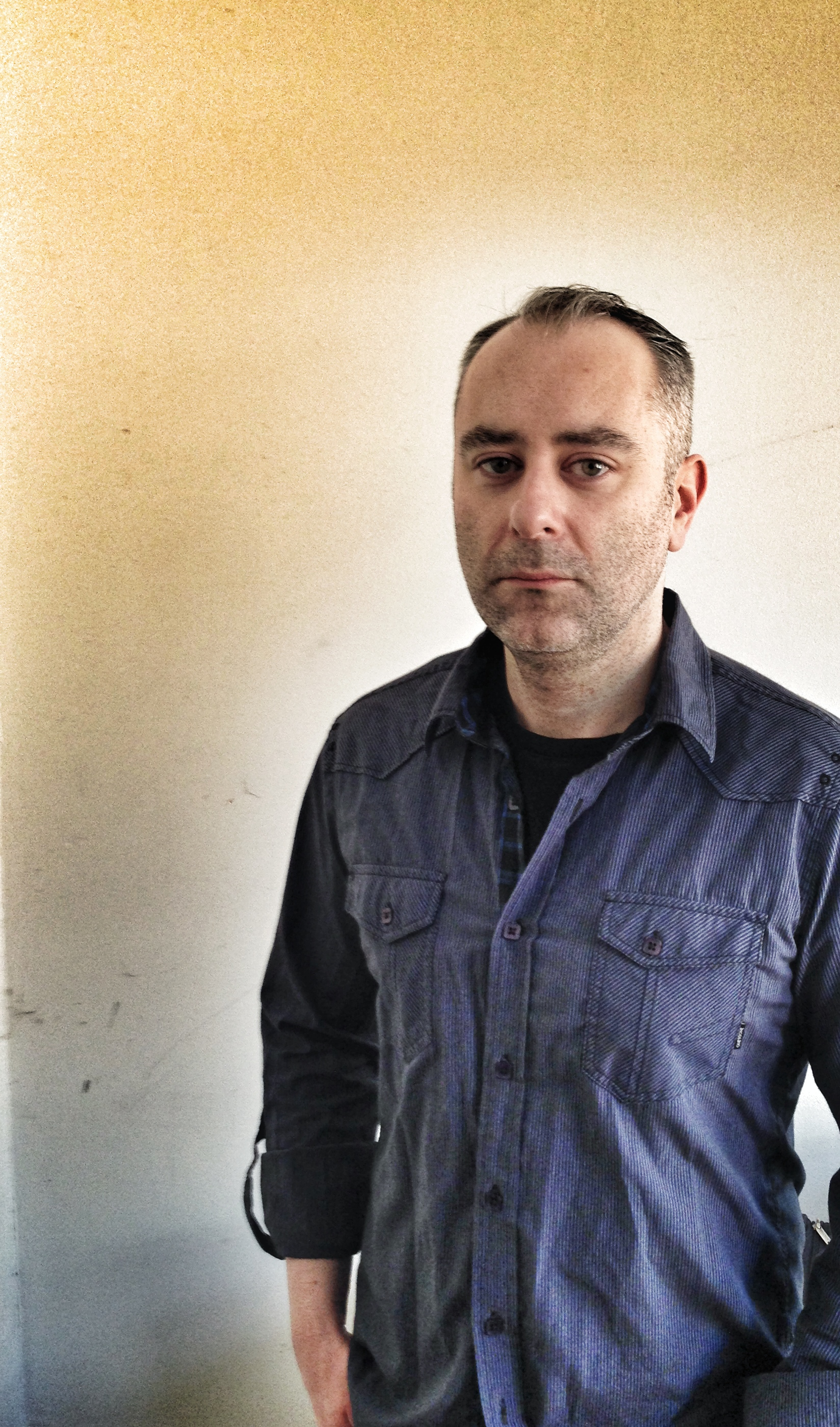
- Born: 1975, 17 September 1975; Jersey
- Education: Guildhall School of Music and Drama
- Awards: Guggenheim Fellowship (2017)
- Website: www.oscarbettison.com

Oscar Bettison (born 19 September 1975) is a British-American composer known for large-scale chamber and large ensemble works. He has been described as possessing "a unique voice". His work has been described as having "an unconventional lyricism and a menacing beauty" and "pulsating with an irrepressible energy and vitality, as well as brilliant craftsmanship." He is a member of the composition faculty at the Peabody Institute in Baltimore. Bettison was named a 2017 Guggenheim Fellow by the John Simon Guggenheim Memorial Foundation.

== Early life and education ==
Bettison was born in 1975 in Jersey to a British father and a Catalan mother. He started playing and composing music at an early age, and at the age of nine joined the Purcell School for Young Musicians in London. After completing an undergraduate degree at the Royal College of Music with Simon Bainbridge, he studied with Robert Saxton at the Guildhall School of Music and Drama. In 2000, he went to the Royal Conservatory of The Hague to study under Louis Andriessen and Martijn Padding, which he has described as a "formative experience." He stayed in The Hague to complete another master's degree, and then went to Princeton University for his PhD, studying with Steven Mackey.

He has been the recipient of a number of awards, including a 2018 Fromm Commission, Chamber Music America Commissioning Award (2013), the Yvar Mikhashoff Commissioning Fund Prize (2009), a Jerwood Foundation Award (1998), the Royal Philharmonic Society Prize (1997), the first BBC Young Composer of the Year Prize (1993) as well as fellowships to both the Tanglewood and Aspen music festivals. Since 2009, he has served on the composition faculty at the Peabody Institute in Baltimore, Maryland, United States. His music is published by Boosey & Hawkes.

== Selected works ==
- O Death (2005–07) for ensemble
- B & E (with aggravated assault) (2006) for ensemble
- Gauze Vespers (2008) for ensemble
- The Afflicted Girl (2010) for ensemble
- Apart (2012) for percussion
- Livre des Sauvages (2012) for large ensemble
- An Automated Sunrise (for Joseph Cornell) (2014) for ensemble
- Threaded Madrigals (2014) for solo viola
- Sea Shaped (2014) for Orchestra
- String Quartet (2015)
- Presence of Absence (2016) for mezzo soprano and large ensemble
- Pale Icons of Night (2018) for violin and ensemble
- Remaking a Forest (2019) for Orchestra
