= Frankie Mann (composer) =

American electronic musician

Frankie Mann (born 1955) is an American electronic music composer and performance artist. Mann was a part of the New York City avant-garde music scene of the 1970s and 1980s. Mann was born in Charlotte, North Carolina in 1955 and studied electronic music at Oberlin College and Mills College, where she studied with David Behrman and Robert Ashley. Mann's work was released by the record label Lovely Music, Ltd.

Mann's music explores electroacoustic sound structures, cultural memory, and the interaction of technology and the body. Mann's compositions have been featured on KPFA-FM in Berkeley, California, where they also had a radio show called "Black Spot Punch." In addition to radio, Mann's work has been featured at numerous visual and performing arts venues in New York City, including at Roulette Intermedium, The Whitney Museum of American Art, and The Museum of Modern Art.

Mann has performed with other electronic music composers such as David Behrman.
