= Gregory Sullivan Isaacs =

Gregory Sullivan Isaacs is an American musician, composer, and classical music critic and music director who has held musical directorships of opera, choral, and symphonic organizations. In 2014, he is the senior classical music critic for the online arts magazine TheaterJones, as well as a freelance writer for other publications, including The Fort Worth Star Telegram. He is a member of ASCAP and the Music Critics Association of North America.

== Early life and education ==
Isaacs earned a high school diploma at the Interlochen Arts Academy. He attended the University of Michigan for two years, and completed a bachelor's degree in music from the University of Miami and a master's degree in music from Indiana University in Bloomington.

== Career ==
In 1993, Isaacs composed an opera in three acts for tenor and piano, Henry Faust. The piece was produced for public television.

In 1995, Isaacs was appointed music director for the Cascade Symphony.

In 2007, Isaacs was the composer in residence and associate conductor for the Living Opera in Dallas, Texas. Isaacs was winner of a Peabody Award for operatic television performance. "Undelivered", his dramatic cantata for voices and a chamber ensemble received positive reviews. it was performed by the Hall Ensemble in Fort Worth.

He presents introductory talks for some Dallas Opera productions, such as 2015 La Wally / Everest. Isaacs continues to write regular reviews, interviews and commentary for Theater Jones, and contributes articles about music and theater subjects to various magazines and news outlets.

His music is published by MUSIK FABRIK in Paris, France.
