= Jeffrey Brooks =

American composer living in Minneapolis

Jeffrey Brooks (born 1956) is an American composer living in Minneapolis. Brooks composed the popular work Dreadnought (for wind ensemble) as well as several works for Bang on a Can.

Brooks holds degrees from the University of Minnesota and Yale University. He studied with Louis Andriessen, Gilbert Amy, Allen Forte and Martin Bresnick. In the mid-1980s, at Yale and Tanglewood, he met Steve Martland, Art Jarvinen, Eleanor Hovda, Michael Gordon and David Lang, who have remained the most important influences in his musical life to this day.

Brooks has composed, with few exceptions, instrumental works, from the very small (What Bird am I Thinking of, for piano trio) to the very large (Dreadnought, John Henry, Funeral Music, and Providence), all for forces of 60-plus musicians.

== Works ==
- The Passion (2017)
- Capriccio on the Departure of a Beloved Brother (2015)
- After the Treewatcher, piano and chamber orchestra (2013)
- The Starry Messenger, SSATB (2011)
- John Henry Symphony, concert wind ensemble (2010)
- Funeral Music, concert wind ensemble (2009)
- What Bird am I Thinking of, piano trio (2008)
- Providence, double concerto for trumpet and trombone in three movements (2007)
- Skeleton Crew, for mixed amplified chamber ensemble (2005)
- The Erlking, counter tenor and percussion quartet (2004)
- Arbor Day, soprano, double bass and percussion (2003)
- Dreadnought, concert wind ensemble (2001)
- The Thinking Flame, mixed amplified chamber ensemble (1998)
- Planting Tears, violin, cello, clarinet, marimba and piano (1997)
- Composition, Two Pianos (1997)
- Soli, alto sax, marimba and piano (1994)
- Sextet, piano and wind quintet (1991)
