= Paul Phillips (conductor) =

American conductor, composer and music scholar (b.1956)

Paul Schuyler Phillips (born April 28, 1956) is an American conductor, composer and music scholar. He is the Gretchen B. Kimball Director of Orchestral Studies, and Professor of Music at Stanford University, where he directs the Stanford Symphony Orchestra, Stanford Philharmonia, and Stanford Summer Symphony. He has written on Igor Stravinsky and Anthony Burgess.

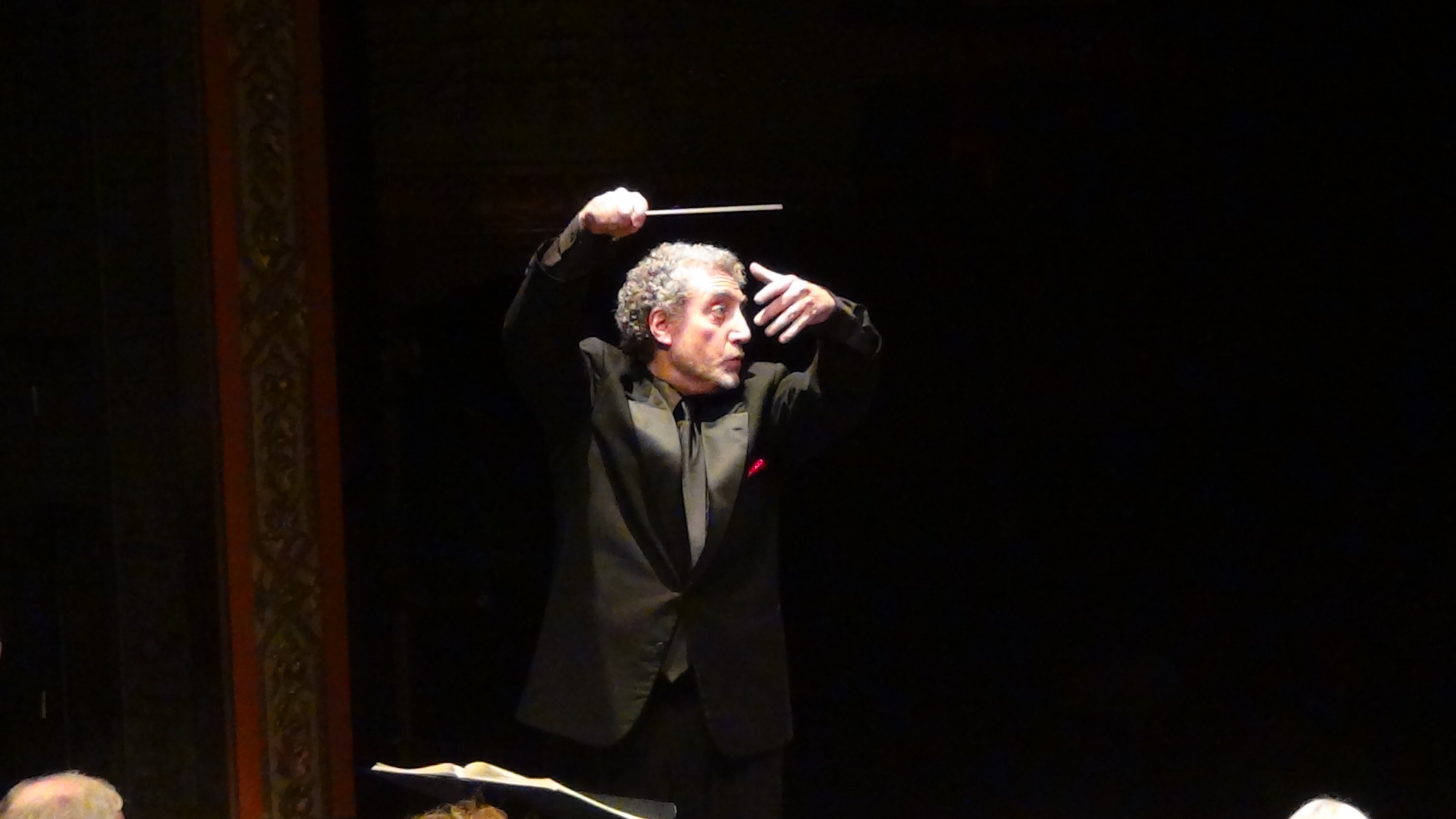

== Conducting ==
In 1982 Phillips became Michael Gielen’s conducting assistant at the Frankfurt Opera, and was appointed 1st Kapellmeister and Chorus Director at Stadttheater Lüneburg the following year. Following positions at the Greensboro Symphony, the Maryland Symphony Orchestra, and the Savannah Symphony, in 1989 Phillips became Director of Orchestras and Chamber Music at Brown University concurrent with an appointment as Associate Conductor of the Rhode Island Philharmonic. In 1994 he was named Music Director and Conductor of the Pioneer Valley Symphony & Chorus. In 2017 Phillips became Director of Orchestral Studies at Stanford.

== Music scholarship ==
Phillips is the editor of The Devil Prefers Mozart: On Music and Musicians, 1962-1993 by Anthony Burgess and author of A Clockwork Counterpoint: The Music and Literature of Anthony Burgess, which examines the relationship between Burgess's music and his writings. Phillips has written an encyclopedia entry on Burgess and several articles on the composer.

In 1999 Phillips was featured as a performer and commentator on Anthony Burgess's music in the BBC television documentary The Burgess Variations, directed by David Thompson.

== Composition ==
=== Concert works ===
Sweet Thunder [12 pianos], 2023
Brass Knuckles [orch], 2016
Wave [orch], 2014
Battle-Pieces (Melville) [B & piano; also B & orchestra], 2011
War Music Suite (Logue) [STB soli & orchestra], 2009
A/B: A 90th Birthday Celebration of Anthony Burgess (Phillips) [actor & chamber ensemble], 2007
Invocation (Rumi) [S, fl, pf], 2004
Black Notes and White [brass, perc, org], 2001
Three Burgess Lyrics (Burgess) [SATB chorus, vln, pf], 1999
Celestial Harmonies [ballet for string orch], 1997
Brownian Motion [orch], 1995
Come On Out and Play (Harley) [singer-narrator & orch], 1996 (based on a story by singer/songwriter Bill Harley)
Miracle Songs (various) [S & piano], 1987

=== Stage works ===
War Music (Christopher Logue), 2005, rev. 2006

- 90-minute music theatre piece based on Logue's adaptation of The Iliad. Commissioned by the RI-based performance ensemble Aurea; premiered September 2005 at the FirstWorksProv Festival in Providence, Rhode Island; revived 2006 at the Chicago Humanities Festival and 2007 at the New York Festival of the Humanities.

Mann ist Mann (Brecht), 1984
Dorothees Abenteuer im Lande des Zauberers von Ooz [Dorothy's Adventures in the Land of the Wizard of Oz] (Baum), 1983
Pericles (Shakespeare), 1978

=== Opera ===
Weedpatch 2018

- Libretto by Bill Harley. Commissioned by North Cambridge Family Opera.
