= Jay Cloidt =

American composer

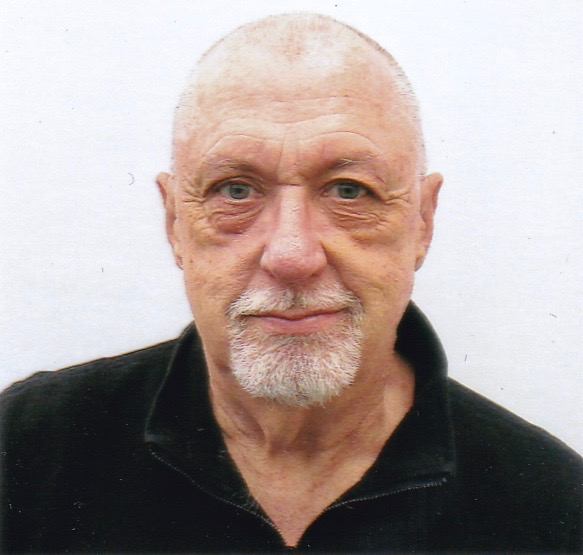
Jay Cloidt - 2020

Jay Cloidt (born October 5, 1949 - died April 17, 2026) is an American composer, performer, sound designer, and audio engineer.

== History ==
Cloidt received his BA in piano performance from the University of Nebraska–Lincoln and his MFA in Electronic Music and the Recording Media from Mills College Center for Contemporary Music in 1981, studying with Robert Ashley and David Behrman.

As a sound designer, he has worked with many groups in the San Francisco Bay Area, including the Kronos Quartet and the Margaret Jenkins Dance Company. Cloidt's work on the Paul Dresher Ensemble's production of Slow Fire won a Bay Area Critics Circle Award, and he received an Isadora Duncan Award in 1989 with Rinde Eckert for the sound design of Eckert's Dry Land Divine.

As a composer, Cloidt has been commissioned by such organizations as the Gary Palmer Dance Company, the Paul Dresher Ensemble, the Margaret Jenkins Dance Company, and the Kronos Quartet, for whom he has written three pieces. His music typically uses electronics, is technically sophisticated, and often contains humor. The San Francisco Chronicle has called Cloidt "The Spike Jones of the Bay Area new music scene." His music has been performed at the Venice Biennale, New Music America, and Lincoln Center.

His solo CD Kole Kat Krush was released by Starkland. All-Music Guide awarded the CD four stars and wrote that the CD is “a wonderful, accessible, and yet challenging album from one of new music's brightest lights.” Stereophile also awarded the CD four stars, describing Cloidt as "one of the few composers in the post-sampler era to fully develop that tool's fascinating and witty potential." Other recordings appear on the MinMax label. In 1999, he also composed music for Leapfrog until 2009 ish.

On October 20, 2017, a retrospective concert and celebration of Cloidt's works - "The Music of Jay Cloidt" - was performed at UC Berkeley's Hertz Concert Hall. Featuring Bay-area musicians and performing artists, the concert included works for the Sather Tower carillon, the Eco Ensemble String Quartet, solo piano, a “duet for pianist and piano” with interactive electronics, and music from the music theater work Darc: Woman on fire for singer and cellist.

== Discography ==
- Kole Kat Krush
- Spectral Evidence
- D'Arc: woman on fire
