= Annette LeSiege =

American composer (1947–2012)

- Born: 1947; Oakland, California, US
- Died: August 26, 2012 (aged 64–65); Marina, California, US
- Occupations: Composer; teacher

Annette LeSiege (1947 – August 26, 2012) was an American composer of contemporary classical music and teacher. She studied French horn and then composition at the San Jose State University, later receiving a composition PhD from the Eastman School of Music, where she studied with Samuel Adler and possibly Warren Benson. LeSiege taught composition for seven years at Wake Forest University, later teaching at New Jersey City University and the University of Maine. Her compositions number 70 published works, and often feature the French horn.

== Life and career ==
Annette LeSiege was born in 1947 in Oakland, California, US. She was raised in Sunnyvale, California by her parents Armand and Mabel LeSiege; amid her father's early death, her stepfather Raymond Phelps helped out. Although a bassoonist in her youth, LeSiege attended San Jose State University (SJSU) to study French horn, graduating in 1968. She stayed at SJSU for a Master of Arts, initially in music history; after studying composition with Higo Hugo Harada she switched to an MA in composition, graduating in 1970. After briefly studying at Cornell University for a PhD in composition, LeSiege switched to the doctorate program at the Eastman School of Music, where she studied with Samuel Adler and possibly Warren Benson, graduating in 1975. For her PhD thesis she wrote the orchestral work Montage and prepared an accompanying musical analysis.

From 1975 to 1982 LeSiege taught composition at Wake Forest University (WFU) as a professor of music. She arrived at WFU was undergoing renovations in the music department; her colleague Edwin Wilson noted that "She came here at an important transition time for the music department". At some point LeSiege was chair of the music department also serving on the council of the College Music Society from 1979 to 1981. She received the Hinda Honingman Composer's Cup in 1981. Among her students was the composer Clare Shore, who recalled her teacher's encouragement in studying works of contemporary classical music, particularly Samuel Barber. LeSiege's other students included composer Sarah Aderholdt. In 1977 LeSiege was a fellow at the MacDowell Colony in the Sprague-Smith studio, only a year old at the time.

After her WFU period, LeSiege's biography becomes less clear. At some point she was managing director of the Symphony for United Nations (now the UN Symphony) and a development officer for the Community Hospital of the Monterey Peninsula. By 1991 she worked at the Santa Catalina School in Monterey, California, as chair of the department of music. Eventually she became a professor of music at the New Jersey City University (NJCU) in Jersey City. An associate professor, she became NJCU's assistant dean of the Music Department and after her retirement in 2009, a professor emerita.

Amid a brain cancer diagnosis in 2009, LeSiege retired from full-time teaching and moved to Rockland, Maine. There she taught composition and liberal arts topics part-time at the University of Maine in Augusta. She died in Marina, California, US on August 26, 2012. In an obituary, the former-student and singer Adria Firestone described her as a "gadfly with feet-on-the-ground playfulness and discipline infused with passion" Soprano Teresa Radomski, a fellow Eastman student, emphasized the beauty and skilled prosody of LeSiege's music, describing her as "a wonderful teacher, warm, compassionate and kind".

== Music ==
External videos
- LeSiege's Shadow Dancer performed by Ian Zook (horn) and Jules Manion and Caroline Salopek (dancers)
- Shadow Dancer

LeSiege's body of work includes 70 published compositions, many of them commissions. The vast majority of them were published by SeeSaw Publishing (since sold to the Subito Music Corporation), of which she may have owned a small part. Her personal mood and the source material would determine her approach to individual compositions and she described music as "controlling the existing energy into sound". Horn player Katey J. Halbert notes that "she did not try to fit one style or technique, but was always experimenting with new processess". Many of LeSiege's works feature the French horn.

== List of compositions ==
See § External links and Halbert (2022, p. 37) for more

- Sapphire Seesaw, orchestra
- Bautade, orchestra
- Shadow Dancer (1994), unaccompanied horn in F
