= Vladimir Belov (pianist) =

Russian pianist and teacher (1906–1989)

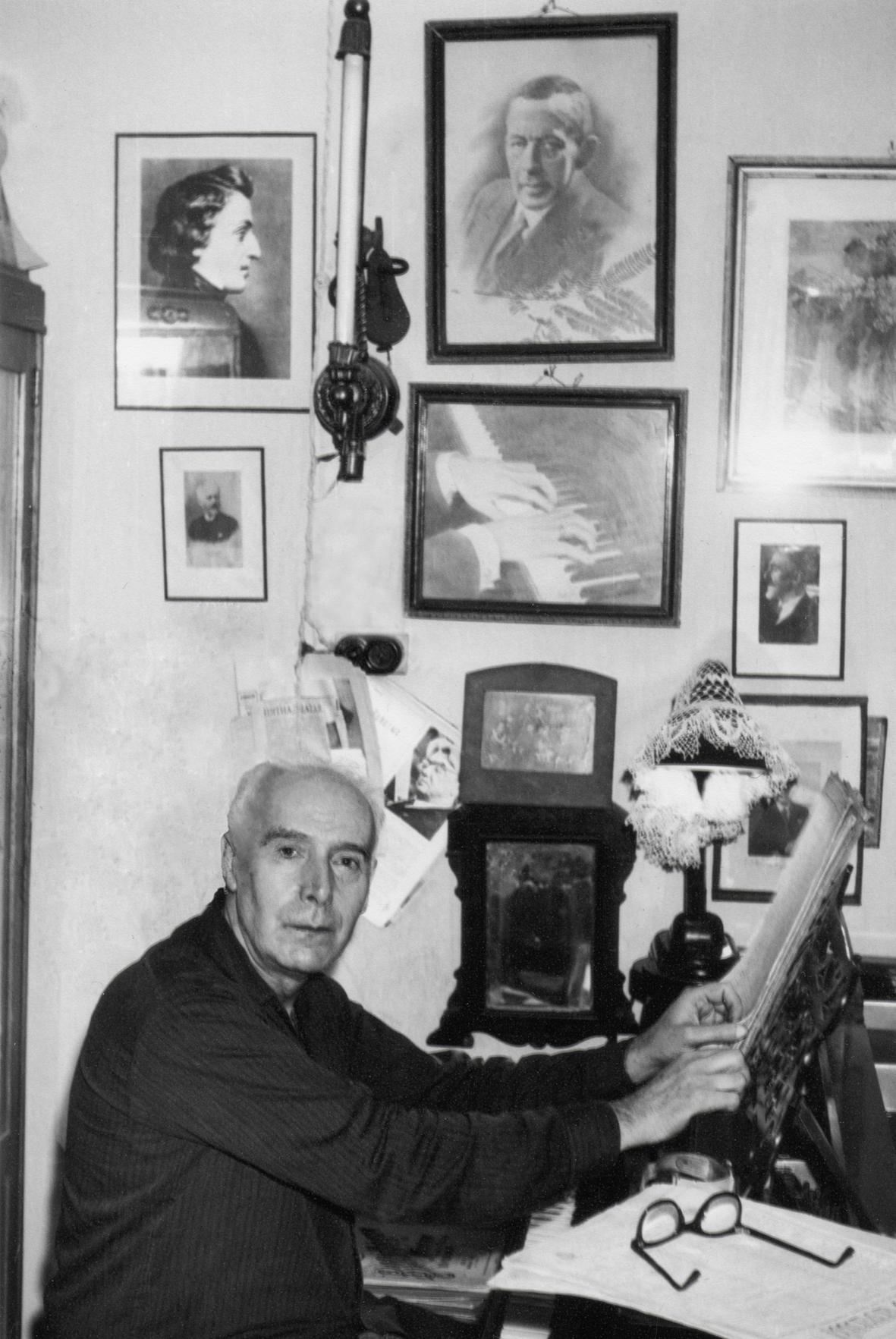
Vladimir Belov

Vladimir Belov (1906–1989) was a Russian pianist and teacher.

A student of Felix Blumenfeld, he launched a successful career as a concert pianist.

As a teacher in the Moscow Conservatory, he was known to be very soft-spoken and lenient with students, whom he taught as a group (his entire class attended each lesson, taking turns at the piano). Among his students were Aleksandr Baltin and Edison Denisov. He also edited a few Russian sheet music editions (typically with many fingering options).

A rare LP recording of Belov is available in the Melodya label, titled "Pupils of Felix Blumenfeld". It features recordings of Maria Grinberg, Simon Barere, Vladimir Horowitz and Belov (playing pieces by Blumenfeld). Although short, this recording attests to his being a formidable pianist.

Vladimir Belov plays Etude g-moll op.14, composer Felix Blumenfeld on YouTube
