= List of music students by teacher: T to Z =

This is the end of a list of students of music, organized by teacher.

== T ==
=== Tarapada Chakraborty ===
- Manas Chakraborty
- Amaresh Roy Chowdhury
- Pratima Bandopadhyay
- Akhilbandhu Ghosh
- Azad Rahman
- Suprabha Sarkar
- Purabi Mukhopadhyay
- Anup Ghoshal

=== Marcel Tabuteau ===
this teacher's teachers
Tabuteau (1887–1966) studied with teachers including Georges Gillet.
- Perry Bauman
- Robert Bloom [pupils]
- John de Lancie [pupils]
- Alfred Genovese
- Harold Gomberg
- Ralph Gomberg
- Marc Lifschey
- John Mack
- Laila Storch

=== Nicola Tacchinardi ===
- Fanny Tacchinardi Persiani

=== Paul Taffanel ===
- Georges Barrère [pupils]
- Louis Fleury
- Philippe Gaubert [pupils]

=== Tōru Takemitsu ===
this teacher's teachers
Takemitsu (1930–1996) studied with teachers including Fumio Hayasaka and Yasuji Kiyose.
- Robert Beaser
- Chester Biscardi [pupils]
- Barry Conyngham

=== Tan Xiaolin ===
this teacher's teachers
Xiaolin studied with teachers including Paul Hindemith.
- Chen Peixun
- Xixian Qu

=== Sergei Taneyev ===
this teacher's teachers
Taneyev (1856–1915) studied with teachers including Nikolai Rubinstein and Pyotr Ilyich Tchaikovsky.
- Georgi Conus [pupils]
- Julius Conus
- Lev Conus
- Reinhold Glière [pupils]
- Aleksandr Goldenweiser [pupils]
- Paul Juon [pupils]
- Alexander Kastalsky [pupils]
- Nikolai Medtner
- Yuri Pomerantsiev [pupils]
- Sergei Rachmaninoff [pupils]
- Leonid Sabaneyev [pupils]
- Konstantin Saradzhev [pupils]
- Alexander Scriabin [pupils]
- Sergei Vasilenko [pupils]
- Jacob Weinberg [pupils]

=== Daniel Tarquínio ===
this teacher's teachers
Daniel Tarquínio studied with teachers including Sylvio Robazzi, Elza Gushiken, and Nadeszda Eismont.
- Roberto Banks
- Fernando Calixto
- Daniel de Vito

=== Francisco Tárrega ===
- Rita Brondi
- Daniel Fortea
- Hilarion Leloup
- Miguel Llobet [pupils]
- Emilio Pujol
- Josefina Robledo
- Pepita Roca
- Pascual Roch

=== Giuseppe Tartini ===
- Carlo Antonio Campioni
- Domenico Dall'Oglio
- Johann Gottlieb Graun
- Pieter Hellendaal [pupils]
- Pierre Lahoussaye
- Pietro Nardini [pupils]
- Johann Gottlieb Naumann [pupils]
- Antonio Nazari
- Maddalena Sirmen
- Anders Wesström

=== Wilhelm Taubert ===
this teacher's teachers
Taubert (1811–1891) studied with teachers including Ludwig Berger and Bernhard Klein.
- Willem Kes [pupils]
- Theodor Kullak [pupils]

=== Dorothy Taubman ===
- Natan Brand [pupils]
- Robert Durso [pupils]
- Leon Fleisher [pupils]
- Edna Golandsky [pupils]
- Yoheved Kaplinsky [pupils]
- Frank Lévy [pupils]
- Diane Thome [pupils]

=== Antoine Taudou ===
this teacher's teachers
Taudou (1846–1925) studied with teachers including .
- Charles Koechlin [pupils]
- Erik Satie [pupils]

=== Carl Tausig ===
this teacher's teachers
Tausig (1841–1871) studied with teachers including Franz Liszt.
- Oscar Beringer [pupils]
- Amy Fay [pupils]
- Sophie Menter
- Adolf Schulz-Evler
- Gustav Weber

=== John Tavener ===
this teacher's teachers
Tavener (1944–2013) studied with teachers including Lennox Berkeley.
- Judith Weir

=== Franklin Taylor ===
this teacher's teachers
Taylor (1843–1919) studied with teachers including Charles Flavell, Moritz Hauptmann, Ignaz Moscheles, Robert Papperitz, Louis Plaidy, Ernst Richter, and Clara Schumann.
- Frederic Cliffe [pupils]
- Herbert Fryer [pupils]
- Battison Haynes [pupils]
- Ethel Hobday
- Bryceson Treharne [pupils]
- Mathilde Verne [pupils]

=== Kendall Taylor ===
this teacher's teachers
Taylor (1905–1999) studied with teachers including Adrian Boult, Vera Dawson, Herbert Fryer, and Gustav Holst.
- Andrew Ball [pupils]
- Ethel Sharpe
- Yonty Solomon [pupils]

=== Alexander Tchaikovsky ===
this teacher's teachers
Alexander Tchaikovsky (1946-) studied with teachers including Tikhon Khrennikov, Lev Naumov, and Heinrich Neuhaus.
- Andrey Kasparov

=== Pyotr Ilyich Tchaikovsky ===
this teacher's teachers
Tchaikovsky (1840–1893) studied with teachers including Anton Rubinstein and Nikolai Zaremba.
- Alexander Kastalsky [pupils]
- Pyotr Schurovsky
- Sergei Taneyev [pupils]

=== Ivan Tcherepnin ===
this teacher's teachers
Tcherepnin (1943–1998) studied with teachers including Karlheinz Stockhausen.
- Atau Tanaka

=== Nikolai Tcherepnin ===
this teacher's teachers
Tcherepnin (1873–1945) studied with teachers including Nikolai Rimsky-Korsakov.
- Vytautas Bacevičius
- Aleksandr Gauk
- Sergei Prokofiev
- Lazare Saminsky
- Yuri Shaporin

=== Serge Tcherepnin ===
this teacher's teachers
Tcherepnin (born 1941) studied with teachers including Nadia Boulanger, Pierre Boulez, Herbert Eimert, Leon Kirchner, Luigi Nono, Isidor Philipp, and Karlheinz Stockhausen.
- Richard Marriott
- Sergei Prokofiev

=== Ignaz Amadeus Tedesco ===
this teacher's teachers
Tedesco (1817–1882) studied with teachers including Václav Tomášek.
- Julius Schulhoff [pupils]

=== Robert Teichmüller ===
this teacher's teachers
Teichmüller (1863–1939) studied with teachers including Carl Reinecke.
- Herbert Albert
- Harry Dean
- Kurt Hessenberg
- Mihail Jora [pupils]
- Eileen Joyce
- Sigfrid Karg-Elert
- Rudolf Mauersberger
- Günther Ramin [pupils]
- Siegfried Rapp
- Rudolf Wagner-Régeny
- Felix Wolfes [pupils]

=== Georg Philipp Telemann ===
- Johann Jeremias du Grain [pupils]
- Ferdinand Zellbell [pupils]

=== Rafael Tello ===
- Silvestre Revueltas

=== Emil Telmányi ===
this teacher's teachers
Telmányi (1892–1988) studied with teachers including Joseph Joachim.
- Gerda Bülow

=== Wayan Tembres ===
- Michael Tenzer [pupils]

=== Giusto Fernando Tenducci ===
- Wolfgang Amadeus Mozart [pupils]

=== James Tenney ===
this teacher's teachers
Tenney (1934–2006) studied with teachers including Kenneth Gaburo, Lejaren Hiller, Harry Partch, Edgard Varèse, and Chou Wen-chung.
- John Luther Adams [pupils]
- John Bischoff
- Peter Garland
- Charlemagne Palestine
- Larry Polansky [pupils]
- Marc Sabat

=== Michael Tenzer ===
this teacher's teachers
Tenzer (born 1957) studied with teachers including Simha Arom, Frank Bennett, Martin Bresnick, N. Govindarajan, Gérard Grisey, Andrew Imbrie, Madé Lebah, José Maceda, I Wayan Suweca, and Wayan Tembres.
- Derek Bermel
- Lisa Bielawa

=== Lionel Tertis ===
this teacher's teachers
Tertis (1876–1975) studied with teachers including Hans Wessely.
- Rebecca Clarke
- Eric Coates
- Raymond Jeremy
- Bernard Shore [pupils]

=== Sigismond Thalberg ===
this teacher's teachers
Thalberg (1812–1871) studied with teachers including Carl Czerny, Ignaz Moscheles, and Simon Sechter.
- Charles-Wilfrid de Bériot [pupils]
- Beniamino Cesi [pupils]
- Virginia Gabriel
- Antoine de Kontski [pupils]
- Charles Poisot
- Alfonso Rendano
- Aloys Tausig

=== Hilda Thegerström ===
this teacher's teachers
Thegerström (1838–1907) studied with teachers including Franz Berwald.
- Valborg Aulin

=== Johann Theile ===
this teacher's teachers
Theile (1646–1724) studied with teachers including Heinrich Schütz.
- Dieterich Buxtehude [pupils]
- Johann Adolph Hasse [pupils]
- Friedrich Wilhelm Zachow

=== Willi Thern ===
- Erwin Schulhoff

=== Jacques Thibaud ===
- Luis Pacheco de Céspedes
- Joan Field
- Zino Francescatti
- Henryk Kowalski
- Louis Persinger [pupils]
- Ljerko Spiller [pupils]
- Henryk Szeryng [pupils]

=== Ambroise Thomas ===
this teacher's teachers
Thomas (1811–1896) studied with teachers including Jean-François Le Sueur and Pierre-Joseph-Guillaume Zimmerman.
- Théodore Dubois [pupils]
- Gerónimo Giménez
- Albert Lavignac [pupils]
- Raoul Pugno [pupils]
- Gaston Serpette

=== István Thomán ===
this teacher's teachers
Thomán (1862–1940) studied with teachers including Franz Liszt.
- Béla Bartók [pupils]
- Georges Cziffra
- Ernő Dohnányi [pupils]
- Paul de Marky
- Fritz Reiner [pupils]

=== Diane Thome ===
this teacher's teachers
Thome (born 1942) studied with teachers including Milton Babbitt, Roy Harris, Darius Milhaud, Robert Strassburg, and Dorothy Taubman.
- Linda Antas

=== Randall Thompson ===
- Samuel Adler [pupils]
- Leonard Bernstein [pupils]
- David Borden
- Joel Cohen
- John Davison
- Lukas Foss [pupils]
- Karl Kohn [pupils]
- Leo Kraft [pupils]
- George Lynn
- Juan Orrego-Salas [pupils]
- William P. Perry
- Frederic Rzewski
- Richard Edward Wilson
- Yehudi Wyner [pupils]

=== César Thomson ===
this teacher's teachers
Thomson (1857–1931) studied with teachers including Jacques Dupuis, Désiré Heynberg, Hubert Léonard, Lambert Massart, Rodolphe Massart, Henri Vieuxtemps, and Henryk Wieniawski.
- Oskar Back [pupils]
- Rosario Scalero [pupils]

=== Virgil Thomson ===
this teacher's teachers
Thomson (1896–1989) studied with teachers including Nadia Boulanger, Edward Burlingame Hill, and Rosario Scalero.
- Paul Bowles
- Lou Harrison [pupils]
- Ned Rorem [pupils]

=== Ludwig Thuille ===
this teacher's teachers
Thuille (1861–1907) studied with teachers including Carl Baermann, Joseph Pembaur, and Josef Rheinberger.
- Hermann Abendroth [pupils]
- Ernest Bloch [pupils]
- Walter Blume
- Ernst Boehe
- Walter Braunfels [pupils]
- Adolf Chybiński [pupils]
- Henry Kimball Hadley
- Paul von Klenau
- Felix vom Rath
- Kurt Schindler
- Walter R. Spalding
- Rudi Stephan
- Friedrich Weigmann
- Richard Wetz

=== Jukka Tiensuu ===
- Gleb Kanasevich [pupils]
- Seunghee Lee [pupils]
- Bin Li [pupils]
- Sergio Luque [pupils]
- SukJu Na [pupils]
- Chun-ting Pang [pupils]
- Wang Ying [pupils]

=== Heinz Tiessen ===
- Sergiu Celibidache
- Eduard Erdmann [pupils]
- Wladimir Vogel [pupils]

=== Edgar Tinel ===
this teacher's teachers
Tinel (1854–1912) studied with teachers including Louis Brassin and François-Auguste Gevaert.
- Joseph Ryelandt

=== Maria Tipo ===
- Andrea Lucchesini
- Ricardo Castro
- Giovanni Nesi
- Nelson Goerner
- Pietro De Maria
- Alessandro Marangoni
- Fabio Bidini

=== Michael Tippett ===
this teacher's teachers
Tippett (1905–1998) studied with teachers including Adrian Boult, Gordon Jacob, Charles Herbert Kitson, R. O. Morris, Aubin Raymar, Malcolm Sargent, and Charles Wood.
- John Purser
- Alan Ridout
- Elliott Schwartz
- Raymond Warren

=== Johann Nikolaus Tischer ===
this teacher's teachers
Tischer (1707-1774) studied with teachers including Johann Sebastian Bach and Johann Graf.
- Johann Gottfried Vierling [pupils]

=== Yakov Tkatch ===
- Emil Gilels

=== Ernst Toch ===
this teacher's teachers
Toch (1887–1964) studied with teachers including Iwan Knorr and Willy Rehberg.
- Jacob Avshalomov
- Jay Chernis [pupils]
- Vagn Holmboe [pupils]
- Mantle Hood
- Mel Powell [pupils]
- André Previn
- Richard Wernick [pupils]

=== Felice Togni ===
this teacher's teachers
Togni (1871-1929) studied with teachers including Willem Kes, André van Riemsdijk, and Christiaan Timmner.
- Gerardus Hendrik Boedijn
- Annie van den Brink-Pothuis
- Sem Dresden [pupils]
- Jan Felderhof
- Cor Kint
- Nap de Klijn
- Joachim Röntgen
- Leon Sametini [pupils]
- Emmy Wegener

=== Eduard Toldrà ===
this teacher's teachers
Toldrà (1895–1962) studied with teachers including Lluís Millet, Enrique Morera, and Jaime Pahissa.
- Antoni Ros-Marbà [pupils]
- Xavier Montsalvatge [pupils]

=== Václav Tomášek ===
Tomášek (1774–1850, also 'Tomaschek'), autodidact

- Alexander Dreyschock [pupils]
- Eduard Hanslick
- Johann Friedrich Kittl [pupils]
- Henry Hugo Pierson [pupils]
- Julius Schulhoff [pupils]
- Ignaz Amadeus Tedesco [pupils]
- Jan Václav Voříšek
- Charles Wels

=== István Tomka ===
- Ede Poldini

=== Giuseppe Torelli ===
this teacher's teachers
Torelli (1658–1709 studied with teachers including Dionisio Bellante, Ercole Gaibara, and Giacomo Antonio Perti.
- Evaristo Felice Dall'Abaco (probably)
- Francesco Manfredini

=== Montserrat Torrent ===
this teacher's teachers
Torrent (b. 1926) studied with teachers including Gregori Estrada i Gamissans, Ferdando Germani, Frank Marshall, Carles Pellicer i Boulanger, Noëlie Pierront, Helmuth Rilling, Blai Net i Sunyer, and Luigi Ferdinando Tagliavini.
- Jordi Alcaraz
- Juan Paradell-Solé

=== Laurits Christian Tørsleff ===
- Josef Hermann Wagenmann

=== Arturo Toscanini ===
this teacher's teachers
Toscanini (1867–1957) studied with teachers including Leandro Carini and Giusto Dacci.
- Alfredo Antonini

=== Firmin Touche ===
- Raymond Gallois-Montbrun [pupils]
- Gerda Bülow

=== Charles Tournemire ===
- Maurice Duruflé
- Jean Langlais [pupils]
- Cristòfor Taltabull

=== Donald Tovey ===
- Robert Bruce
- Abram Chasins
- Erik Chisholm
- Victor Hely-Hutchinson
- Frederick Septimus Kelly
- Janet Teissier du Cros
- William Wordsworth

=== Joan Tower ===
this teacher's teachers
Tower (born 1938) studied with teachers including Jack Beeson, Otto Luening, and Vladimir Ussachevsky.
- Chaya Czernowin [pupils]

=== Tommaso Traetta ===
this teacher's teachers
Traetta (1727–1779) studied with teachers including Nicola Porpora.
- Jean-Joseph Rodolphe

=== Bryceson Treharne ===
this teacher's teachers
Treharne (1877–1948) studied with teachers including Frederick Bridge, Edward Dannreuther, Walter Parratt, Hubert Parry, Ernst Pauer, Charles Villiers Stanford, and Franklin Taylor.
- Clytie Hine [pupils]
- Maude Mary Puddy

=== Gilles Tremblay ===
this teacher's teachers
Tremblay (born 1932) studied with teachers including Yvonne Loriod, Maurice Martenot, Olivier Messiaen, and Karlheinz Stockhausen.
- Raynald Arseneault
- Yves Daoust
- Ramon Lazkano
- Robin Minard
- Éric Morin
- Silvio Palmieri
- Micheline Coulombe Saint-Marcoux
- André Villeneuve
- Claude Vivier

=== Lennie Tristano ===
- Billy Bauer
- Connie Crothers [pupils]
- Stan Fortuna
- Dave Frank [pupils]
- Lee Konitz [pupils]
- Al Levitt
- Warne Marsh
- Charles Mingus
- Sal Mosca
- Martin Rev
- William Russo [pupils]
- Joe Satriani
- Phil Woods

=== Giacomo Tritto ===
- Vincenzo Bellini
- Vincenzo Fabrizi
- Giuseppe Farinelli
- Ferdinando Orlandi
- Gaspare Spontini

=== František Tůma ===
this teacher's teachers
Tůma (1704–1774) studied with teachers including Bohuslav Matěj Černohorský and Johann Joseph Fux.
- Josef Seger [pupils]

=== Józef Turczyński ===
this teacher's teachers
Turczyński (1884–1953) studied with teachers including Ferruccio Busoni and Anna Yesipova.
- Henryk Sztompka
- Stanisław Szpinalski
- Maria Wiłkomirska
- Grażyna Bacewicz
- Theodore Gutman
- Witold Małcużyński
- Max Fishman,
- Mieczysław Weinberg
- Halina Czerny-Stefańska
- Ryszard Bakst

=== Joaquín Turina ===
- Vicente Asencio
- Celedonio Romero
- Pedro Sanjuan [pupils]

=== Daniel Gottlob Türk ===
this teacher's teachers
Türk (1750–1813) studied with teachers including Johann Adam Hiller and Gottfried August Homilius.
- Carl Loewe
- Johann Friedrich Naue
- Adolf Bernhard Marx [pupils]
- Hermann Uber
- Carl Traugott Zeuner

=== Mark-Anthony Turnage ===
this teacher's teachers
Turnage (1960–) studied with teachers including Oliver Knussen, John Lambert, and Gunther Schuller.
- Charlotte Bray
- William Dougherty

=== Robert Turner ===
this teacher's teachers
Turner (1920–2012) studied with teachers including Claude Champagne, Roy Harris, Herbert Howells, Gordon Jacob, and Olivier Messiaen.
- Peter Allen
- Glenn Buhr [pupils]
- Pat Carrabré
- Jim Hiscott
- Diana McIntosh

=== Burnet Tuthill ===
- Moondog

=== Hans Tutschku ===
- Ann Cleare

=== "Blue" Gene Tyranny ===
- Philip A. Perkins

== U ==
=== Marco Uccellini ===
- Giovanni Maria Bononcini [pupils]

=== Delphine Ugalde ===
- Marie Sasse
- Marguerite Ugalde

=== Vincenzo Ugolini ===
- Orazio Benevoli [pupils]
- Marc'Antonio Pasqualini

=== Chinary Ung ===
this teacher's teachers
Ung studied with teachers including Chou Wen-chung and Mario Davidovsky.
- Koji Nakano

=== Heinrich Urban ===
- Josef Hofmann [pupils]
- Henryk Opieński
- Carl Adolph Preyer

=== Erich Urbanner ===
- Gilles Bellemare
- Miguel del Aguila
- Johanna Doderer
- Clemens Gadenstätter
- Thomas Larcher
- Lukas Ligeti
- Olga Neuwirth
- James Poke
- Gerhard Schedl
- Alexander Wagendristl
- Wolfram Wagner [pupils]

=== Gennaro Ursino ===
this teacher's teachers
Ursino (1650–1715) studied with teachers including Giovanni Salvatore.
- Gaetano Greco [pupils]

=== Anton Urspruch ===
this teacher's teachers
Urspruch (1850–1907) studied with teachers including Franz Lachner, Franz Liszt, and Joachim Raff.
- Walter Damrosch

=== Vladimir Ussachevsky ===
- Charles L. Bestor
- Wendy Carlos
- Sergio Cervetti [pupils]
- Charles Dodge
- Richard Einhorn
- Ben Johnston [pupils]
- Ingram Marshall
- Ilhan Mimaroglu
- Eric Salzman
- Daria Semegen [pupils]
- Alice Shields
- Faye-Ellen Silverman
- Joan Tower [pupils]
- Michiko Toyama
- Charles Wuorinen [pupils]

=== Galina Ustvolskaya ===
this teacher's teachers
Ustvolskaya (1919–2006) studied with teachers including Georgi Rimski-Korsakov, Dmitri Shostakovich, and Maximilian Steinberg.
- Boris Tishchenko

== V ==
=== Fartein Valen ===
this teacher's teachers
Valen (1887–1952) studied with teachers including Catharinus Elling.
- Klaus Egge

=== Giovanni Valentini ===
- Johann Caspar Kerll [pupils]

=== Giovanni Valesi ===
- Johann Valentin Adamberger
- Wilhelm Sutor
- Carl Maria von Weber [pupils]

=== Francesco Antonio Vallotti ===
this teacher's teachers
Vallotti (1697–1780) studied with teachers including Giovanni Ambrogio Bissone and Francesco Antonio Calegari.
- Luigi Antonio Sabbatini
- Georg Joseph Vogler [pupils]

=== Gilius van Bergeijk ===
- Richard Ayres
- Allison Cameron
- Frank P Martinez
- Ric Sims
- Jasna Veličković
- Sinta Wullur
- Kristoffer Zegers
- Ivana Kis

=== David Van Vactor ===
- David P. Sartor
- Gil Trythall
- Richard Aaker Trythall

=== Edgard Varèse ===
- Chou Wen-chung
- Lucia Dlugoszewski
- André Jolivet
- Colin McPhee [pupils]
- William Grant Still
- James Tenney [pupils]
- Marc Wilkinson

=== Sergei Vasilenko ===
this teacher's teachers
Vasilenko (1872–1956) studied with teachers including Mikhail Ippolitov-Ivanov and Sergei Taneyev.
- Nikolai Golovanov [pupils]
- Aram Khachaturian [pupils]
- Aarre Merikanto [pupils]
- Väinö Raitio
- Nikolai Rakov [pupils]
- Nikolai Roslavets

=== Ralph Vaughan Williams ===
this teacher's teachers
Vaughan Williams (1872–1958) studied with teachers including Hubert Parry, Maurice Ravel, Herbert Sharpe, Charles Villiers Stanford, and Charles Wood.
- Stanley Bate
- Arthur Bliss
- Ina Boyle
- Amice Calverley
- Hubert Clifford
- Jean Coulthard
- David Cox
- Cedric Thorpe Davie
- Howard Ferguson [pupils]
- Armstrong Gibbs
- Ruth Gipps
- Peggy Glanville-Hicks
- Helen Glatz [pupils]
- Dorothy Gow
- Ivor Gurney
- Patrick Hadley [pupils]
- Imogen Holst [pupils]
- Gordon Jacob [pupils]
- Constant Lambert [pupils]
- William Lloyd Webber [pupils]
- Elizabeth Maconchy [pupils]
- Frederick May
- Robin Milford
- Angus Morrison [pupils]
- Archibald Potter
- Franz Reizenstein
- Edmund Rubbra [pupils]
- Anna Russell
- Bernard Stevens [pupils]
- Joan Trimble
- Percy Turnbull
- Grace Williams

=== Aurelio de la Vega ===
- Harold Budd

=== Isabelle Vengerova ===
this teacher's teachers
Vengerova (1877–1956) studied with teachers including Theodor Leschetizky and Anna Yesipova.
- Stanley Babin
- Samuel Barber
- Ralph Berkowitz
- Leonard Bernstein [pupils]
- Anthony di Bonaventura
- Lukas Foss
- Gary Graffman
- Ignace Hilsberg
- Gilbert Kalish
- Jacob Lateiner [pupils]
- Elvina Truman Pearce
- Leonard Pennario
- Menahem Pressler
- Abbey Simon
- Nicolas Slonimsky

=== Mathilde Verne ===
this teacher's teachers
Verne (1865–1936) studied with teachers including Clara Schumann and Franklin Taylor.
- Ambrose Coviello [pupils]
- Solomon Cutner [pupils]
- Joan Mary Last
- Moura Lympany
- Herbert Menges
- Harold Samuel
- John Vallier
- Adela Verne

=== John Verrall ===
this teacher's teachers
Verrall (1908–2001) studied with teachers including Aaron Copland, Donald Ferguson, Roy Harris, Frederick Jacobi, Zoltán Kodály, and R. O. Morris.
- William Bolcom [pupils]
- Alan Stout [pupils]
- Gloria Wilson Swisher

=== Pauline Viardot ===
this teacher's teachers
Viardot (1821–1910) studied with teachers including Frédéric Chopin and Anton Reicha.
- Ada Adini
- Désirée Artôt [pupils]
- Selma Ek
- Marie Hanfstängl
- Yelizaveta Lavrovskaya
- Rosa Linde
- Félia Litvinne
- Aglaja Orgeni
- Kathinka Paulsen White
- Mafalda Salvatini
- Anna Eugénie Schoen-René [pupils]
- Antoinette Sterling
- Raimund von zur-Mühlen

=== Paul Vidal ===
this teacher's teachers
Vidal (1863–1931) studied with teachers including Jules Massenet.
- Lili Boulanger
- Ricardo Castillo
- Marc Delmas
- Vladimir Fédorov
- André Fleury
- Jacques Ibert
- Alice Sauvrezis
- Jules Semler-Collery

=== Carles Vidiella ===
- Lluís Millet [pupils]

=== Carlo Vidusso ===
- Maurizio Pollini

=== Johann Gottfried Vierling ===
this teacher's teachers
Vierling (1750–1813) studied with teachers including Carl Philipp Emanuel Bach, Johann Kirnberger, and Johann Nikolaus Tischer.
- Johann Christian Friedrich Hæffner [pupils]
- Adam Valentin Volckmar [pupils]

=== Louis Vierne ===
this teacher's teachers
Vierne (1870–1937) studied with teachers including César Franck and Charles-Marie Widor.
- Augustin Barié
- Edward Shippen Barnes
- Lili Boulanger
- Nadia Boulanger [pupils]
- Marcel Dupré [pupils]
- Maurice Duruflé
- André Fleury
- Isadore Freed
- Henri Gagnebin
- Gaston Litaize
- Édouard Mignan
- Émile Poillot [pupils]
- Bronisław Rutkowski [pupils]
- Alexander Schreiner
- Georges-Émile Tanguay

=== Henri Vieuxtemps ===
this teacher's teachers
Vieuxtemps (1820–1881) studied with teachers including Charles Auguste de Bériot, Anton Reicha, Simon Sechter, and Jean-Henri Simon.
- Eduard Caudella
- Alfred De Sève
- Enrique Fernández Arbós
- Sam Franko
- Jenő Hubay [pupils]
- Bernhard Listemann [pupils]
- Barrett Isaac Poznanski
- Émile Sauret [pupils]
- César Thomson [pupils]
- Leonhard Wolff
- Eugène Ysaÿe [pupils]

=== Heitor Villa-Lobos ===
- Cacilda Borges Barbosa

=== Alexander Villoing ===
this teacher's teachers
Villoing (1808–1878) studied with teachers including John Field and Adolf von Henselt.
- Anton Rubinstein [pupils]
- Nikolai Rubinstein [pupils]

=== Ricardo Viñes ===
this teacher's teachers
Viñes (1875–1943) studied with teachers including Charles-Wilfrid de Bériot, Benjamin Godard, and Albert Lavignac.
- Marcelle Meyer
- Léo-Pol Morin.
- Joaquín Nin-Culmell [pupils]
- Francis Poulenc [pupils]
- Maria Canals i Cendrós [pupils]
- Enriqueta Garreta Toldrà

=== Francesco dalla Viola ===
- Luzzasco Luzzaschi [pupils]

=== Giovanni Battista Viotti ===
this teacher's teachers
Viotti (1755–1824) studied with teachers including Gaetano Pugnani.
- Paul Alday
- Pierre Baillot [pupils]
- Charles Auguste de Bériot [pupils]
- Jean-Baptiste Cartier [pupils]
- Auguste Duranowski [pupils]
- Rodolphe Kreutzer [pupils]
- André Robberechts [pupils]
- Pierre Rode [pupils]
- Friedrich Wilhelm Pixis [pupils]

=== János Viski ===
- István Láng

=== Tomaso Antonio Vitali ===
this teacher's teachers
Vitali (1663–1745) studied with teachers including Antonio Maria Pacchioni.
- Evaristo Felice Dall'Abaco
- Girolamo Nicolò Laurenti
- Luca Antonio Predieri
- Jean Baptiste Senaillé

=== Jāzeps Vītols ===
- Tālivaldis Ķeniņš
- Wiktor Łabuński
- Nikolai Myaskovsky [pupils]
- Sergei Prokofiev [pupils]

=== Loreto Vittori ===
- Bernardo Pasquini [pupils]

=== Antonio Vivaldi ===
this teacher's teachers
Vivaldi (1678–1741) studied with teachers including Giovanni Legrenzi.
- Johann Georg Pisendel [pupils]

=== Pancho Vladigerov ===
this teacher's teachers
Vladigerov (1899–1978) studied with teachers including Friedrich Gernsheim.
- Alexander Raichev
- Alexis Weissenberg
- Alexander Yossifov

=== Allin Vlasenko ===
this teacher's teachers
Vlasenko (1938–2021) studied with teachers including G. Rykov and Alisa Vidulina.
- Natalia Ponomarchuk
- Volodymyr Sirenko [pupils]

=== Wladimir Vogel ===
this teacher's teachers
Vogel (1896–1984) studied with teachers including Heinz Tiessen.
- Erik Bergman
- Rolf Liebermann
- Einojuhani Rautavaara

=== Georg Joseph Vogler ===
this teacher's teachers
Vogler (1749–1814) studied with teachers including Francesco Antonio Vallotti.
- Joseph von Blumenthal [pupils]
- Bernhard Crusell
- Franz Danzi
- Johann Baptist Gänsbacher
- Giacomo Meyerbeer
- Johann Nepomuk von Poißl
- Johann Nepomuk Schelble
- Bedřich Diviš Weber [pupils]
- Carl Maria von Weber [pupils]
- Peter Winter

=== Robert Volkmann ===
this teacher's teachers
Volkmann (1815–1883) studied with teachers including August Ferdinand Anacker.
- Geza Zichy

=== Georg Jacob Vollweiler ===
- Johann Anton André
- Ferdinand Hiller
- Désiré Magnus
- Aloys Schmitt

=== Han de Vries ===
this teacher's teachers
de Vries (1941–present) studied with teachers including Jaap Stotijn.
- Peter Bree
- Bart Schneemann

=== Petr Vronský ===
this teacher's teachers
Vronský (b. 1946) studied with teachers including Robert Brock, Alois Klima, Bohumír Liška, and Jindřich Rohan.
- Tomáš Brauner

== W ==
=== Bernard Wagenaar ===
- Tutti Camarata
- James Cohn
- Peter Dickinson [pupils]
- Jacob Druckman
- Bernard Herrmann
- Norman Dello Joio
- Charles Jones
- Jerome Moross
- Mel Powell [pupils]
- Natalia Raigorodsky
- Ned Rorem [pupils]
- Alan Shulman
- Robert Ward
- Katharine Mulky Warne

=== Diderik Wagenaar ===
- Michel van der Aa

=== Johan Wagenaar ===
- Allard de Ridder [pupils]
- Barbara Pentland
- Willem Pijper [pupils]
- Alexander Voormolen
- Bernard Wagenaar [pupils]

=== Georg Christoph Wagenseil ===
this teacher's teachers
Wagenseil (1715–1777) studied with teachers including Johann Joseph Fux.
- František Xaver Dušek [pupils]
- Marie Antoinette
- Giovanni Antonio Matielli
- Johann Baptist Schenk [pupils]
- Joseph Anton Steffan [pupils]
- Franz Teyber

=== Percy Waller ===
this teacher's teachers
Waller (–) studied with teachers including Frederick Gostelow and Tobias Matthay.
- Cornelius Cardew [pupils]
- Dorothy Howell [pupils]
- Ronald Smith

=== Peter Wallfisch ===
this teacher's teachers
Wallfisch (1924–1993) studied with teachers including Jacques Février and Marguerite Long.
- Kevin Farrell
- Valentin Schiedermair

=== Thomas Attwood Walmisley ===
this teacher's teachers
Walmisley (1814–1856) studied with teachers including Thomas Attwood.
- Henry Hugo Pierson [pupils]

=== Thomas Forbes Walmisley ===
this teacher's teachers
T. F. Walmisley (1783–1866) studied with teachers including Thomas Attwood and John Spencer.
- Edward John Hopkins [pupils]

=== William Wallace ===
this teacher's teachers
Wallace 1860–1940) studied with teachers including Alexander Mackenzie and Frederick Corder.
- William Alwyn [pupils]

=== Bruno Walter ===
this teacher's teachers
Walter (1876–1962) studied with teachers including Robert Radeke.
- Albert van Raalte
- Jerzy Semkow

=== Johann Gottfried Walther ===
- Johann Ludwig Krebs

=== Raymond Warren ===
this teacher's teachers
Warren (b1928) studied with teachers including Boris Ord, Robin Orr, Michael Tippett, Lennox Berkeley, and Benjamin Britten.
- Christopher Austin
- David Byers
- Eibhlis Farrell
- Philip Hammond
- Will Todd

=== Samuel Webbe ===
this teacher's teachers
Webbe (1740–1816) studied with teachers including Charles Barbandt.
- Vincent Novello [pupils]

=== Bedřich Diviš Weber ===
this teacher's teachers
Weber (1766–1842) studied with teachers including Georg Joseph Vogler.
- Carl Maria von Bocklet [pupils]
- Ignaz Moscheles [pupils]

=== Carl Maria von Weber ===
this teacher's teachers
Weber (1786–1826) studied with teachers including Michael Haydn, Johann Peter Heuschkel, Johann Evangelist Wallishauser, Johann Nepomuk Kalcher, and Georg Joseph Vogler.
- Julius Benedict [pupils]

=== Anton Webern ===
this teacher's teachers
Webern (1883–1945) studied with teachers including Guido Adler and Arnold Schoenberg.
- Arnold Elston
- Fré Focke
- Philip Herschkowitz [pupils]
- René Leibowitz [pupils]
- Matty Niël
- Helen Perkin
- Humphrey Searle [pupils]
- Leopold Spinner [pupils]
- Stefan Wolpe [pupils]
- Hans Swarowsky [pupils]

=== Georg Caspar Wecker ===
this teacher's teachers
Wecker (1632–1695) studied with teachers including Johann Erasmus Kindermann.
- Johann Krieger
- Johann Pachelbel [pupils]

=== Adolf Weidig ===
this teacher's teachers
Weidig (1867–1931) studied with teachers including Hugo Riemann.
- Vivian Fine
- Ruth Crawford [pupils]

=== Jacob Weinberg ===
this teacher's teachers
Weinberg (1879–1956) studied with teachers including Theodor Leschetizky and Sergei Taneyev.
- Mordecai Sandberg
- Joseph Yasser

=== Leó Weiner ===
this teacher's teachers
Weiner (1885–1960) studied with teachers including Hans von Koessler.
- Géza Anda
- Ferenc Farkas [pupils]
- Ferenc Fricsay
- Laszlo Halasz [pupils]
- Fritz Reiner [pupils]
- György Sebők
- Béla Síki
- Sir Georg Solti
- Janos Starker
- Ferenc Szabó

=== Christian Ehregott Weinlig ===
this teacher's teachers
Weinlig (1743–1813) studied with teachers including Gottfried August Homilius.
- Christian Theodor Weinlig [pupils] (his nephew)

=== Christian Theodor Weinlig ===
this teacher's teachers
Weinlig (1780–1842) studied with teachers including Christian Ehregott Weinlig and Stanislao Mattei.
- Ernst Richter [pupils]
- Clara Schumann
- Richard Wagner

=== John Weinzweig ===
this teacher's teachers
Weinzweig (1913–2006) studied with teachers including Howard Hanson, Bernard Rogers, and Healey Willan.
- Murray Adaskin [pupils]
- Robert Aitken
- Kristi Allik
- Milton Barnes
- John Beckwith
- Norma Beecroft
- Lorne Betts
- Howard Cable
- Charles Camilleri [pupils]
- Brian Cherney
- Gustav Ciamaga
- Samuel Dolin
- John Fodi
- Clifford Ford
- Harry Freedman
- Srul Irving Glick
- Jack Kane
- Peter Paul Koprowski
- Alfred Kunz
- Bruce Mather
- Ben McPeek
- Mavor Moore
- Marjan Mozetich
- Phil Nimmons
- Kenneth Peacock
- Paul Pedersen
- Doug Riley
- John Rimmer
- R. Murray Schafer
- Harry Somers
- Ben Steinberg
- Fred Stone
- Rudy Toth
- Kenny Wheeler

=== Hugo Weisgall ===
this teacher's teachers
Weisgall (1912–1997) studied with teachers including Rosario Scalero and Roger Sessions.
- Dominick Argento [pupils]
- Paul Lansky [pupils]
- Bruce Saylor
- William Schimmel

=== Hans Weisse ===
this teacher's teachers
Weisse (1892–1940) studied with teachers including Heinrich Schenker.
- Adele T. Katz
- George Rochberg [pupils]
- Felix Salzer [pupils]

=== Carl Friedrich Weitzmann ===
this teacher's teachers
Weitzmann (1808–1880) studied with teachers including Moritz Hauptmann.
- Adolf Mohr
- William Hall Sherwood [pupils]

=== Dan Welcher ===
this teacher's teachers
Welcher (born 1948) studied with teachers including Samuel Adler.
- Peter Askim
- Anthony Gatto
- Brandon Scott Rumsey [pupils]
- Anthony Suter [pupils]

=== Egon Wellesz ===
this teacher's teachers
Wellesz (1885–1974) studied with teachers including Guido Adler and Arnold Schoenberg.
- Herbert Chappell [pupils]
- Martin Cooper
- Peggy Glanville-Hicks
- Kunihiko Hashimoto [pupils]
- Spike Hughes
- Nicola LeFanu [pupils]
- Frederick May
- Wilfrid Mellers
- Nigel Osborne
- Peter Sculthorpe [pupils]
- Eric Wetherell
- Grace Williams

=== Richard Wernick ===
this teacher's teachers
Wernick (born 1934) studied with teachers including Arthur Berger, Boris Blacher, Irving Fine, Leon Kirchner, Harold Shapero, and Ernst Toch.
- Robert Carl
- Stephen Jaffe
- Yinam Leef
- Philip Maneval
- James Primosch
- Jay Reise
- Melinda Wagner

=== Samuel Wesley ===
this teacher's teachers
Wesley (1766–1837) studied with teachers including Sarah Wesley and David Williams.
- Edward Francis Rimbault

=== Hans Wessely ===
this teacher's teachers
Wessely (1862–1926) studied with teachers including Jakob Grün, Joseph Hellmesberger, Sr., and Carl Heissler.
- Rebecca Clarke
- Percy Hilder Miles [pupils]
- Lionel Tertis [pupils]
- Rowsby Woof [pupils]
- E. Florence Whitlock

=== Peter Westergaard ===
this teacher's teachers
Westergaard (born 1931) studied with teachers including Wolfgang Fortner, Darius Milhaud, and Roger Sessions.
- Maura Bosch
- John Heiss [pupils]
- Jay Krasnow [pupils]
- Gilbert Levine
- John Melby

=== Frederik Thorkildsen Wexschall ===
this teacher's teachers
Wexschall (1798–1845) studied with teachers including Peter Mandrup Lem and Louis Spohr.
- Ole Bull
- Niels Gade [pupils]
- Holger Simon Paulli

=== José White Lafitte ===
- Achille Rivarde [pupils]

=== Cuthbert Whitemore ===
this teacher's teachers
Whitemore (1877–1927) studied with teachers including Tobias Matthay.
- Harold Craxton [pupils]
- Phyllis Sellick [pupils]

=== Arthur Batelle Whiting ===
- Daniel Gregory Mason

=== Charles-Marie Widor ===
this teacher's teachers
Widor (1844–1937) studied with teachers including François-Joseph Fétis and Jacques-Nicolas Lemmens.
- Seth Bingham
- Nadia Boulanger [pupils]
- Virginia Carrington-Thomas
- Georges Dandelot
- Marcel Dupré [pupils]
- Henri Gagnon
- Arthur Honegger [pupils]
- Dumitru Georgescu Kiriac [pupils]
- Olivier Messiaen [pupils]
- Georges Migot
- Darius Milhaud [pupils]
- André Pirro [pupils]
- Olga Samaroff [pupils]
- Alexander Schreiner
- Albert Schweitzer
- Charles Tournemire [pupils]
- Edgard Varèse [pupils]
- Louis Vierne [pupils]
- Horace Whitehouse
- Christopher Wilson

=== Friedrich Wieck ===
- Hans von Bülow [pupils]
- Gustav Merkel
- Clara Schumann [pupils]
- Robert Schumann [pupils]
- Isidor Seiss [pupils]
- Fritz Spindler
- Ernst Ferdinand Wenzel

=== Henryk Wieniawski ===
this teacher's teachers
Wieniawski (1835–1880) studied with teachers including Joseph Clavel, Lambert Massart, and Stanisław Serwaczyński.
- Louis Glass
- Achille Rivarde
- Émile Sauret [pupils]
- César Thomson [pupils]
- Willem Kes [pupils]
- Eugène Ysaÿe [pupils]

=== Wilhelm Friedrich Wieprecht ===
- Ludwig Bussler [pupils]

=== August Wilhelmj ===
this teacher's teachers
Wilhelmj (1845–1908) studied with teachers including Moritz Hauptmann and Joachim Raff.
- Aylmer Buesst
- Alfredo D'Ambrosio
- Nahan Franko
- Harold Grimson
- Jessie Grimson
- Donald Heins
- William Henley
- Beatrice Langley
- Adrian Rappoldi

=== Adrian Willaert ===
- Costanzo Porta [pupils]
- Nicola Vicentino [pupils]
- Gioseffo Zarlino [pupils]

=== Healey Willan ===
this teacher's teachers
Willan (1880–1968) studied with teachers including Evlyn Howard-Jones, William Stevenson Hoyte, and Walter Hay Sangster.
- Patricia Blomfield Holt
- Howard Brown
- F. R. C. Clarke
- Robert Fleming
- Cecil Gray
- Phyllis Gummer
- Walter MacNutt
- Kenneth Peacock
- John Weinzweig [pupils]
- Gordon Wry
- Naomi Yanova

=== Alberto Williams ===
this teacher's teachers
Williams (1862–1952) studied with teachers including Georges Mathias and César Franck.
- Ernesto Drangosch [pupils]

=== Ernest Williams ===
- Emory Remington

=== John Williams ===
this teacher's teachers
Williams (b. 1941) studied with teachers including Andrés Segovia.
- Carlos Bonell [pupils]
- Nigel North

=== Richard Edward Wilson ===
- Joseph Bertolozzi
- Gordon Green
- Nathan Hall
- William Healy
- Jane O'Leary

=== Godfrey Winham ===
- Charles Dodge

=== Alexander Winkler ===
this teacher's teachers
Winkler (1865–1935) studied with teachers including Alphonse Duvernoy and Theodor Leschetizky.
- Sergei Prokofiev

=== I Nyoman Windha ===
- Richard Marriott

=== Emanuel Wirth ===
- Edmund Severn
- Albert Stoessel [pupils]
- Ernst Wendel [pupils]

=== Peter Wishart ===
- Geoffrey Burgon

=== Johannes Wolf ===
this teacher's teachers
Wolf (1869–1947) studied with teachers including Heinrich Bellermann and Philipp Spitta.
- Adam Sołtys [pupils]

=== Leopold Carl Wolff ===
- Elisabeth Kuyper
- Kosaku Yamada

=== S. Drummond Wolff ===
this teacher's teachers
Wolff (1916–2004) studied with teachers including Walter Galpin Alcock, Ernest Bullock, Charles Herbert Kitson, and Percy Buck.
- F. R. C. Clarke
- James Gayfer

=== Ermanno Wolf-Ferrari ===
this teacher's teachers
Wolf-Ferrari (1876–1948) studied with teachers including Josef Rheinberger.
- Adriano Lualdi
- Paul Nani [pupils]

=== Leonard Wolfson ===
- Aaron Copland [pupils]

=== Stefan Wolpe ===
this teacher's teachers
Wolpe (1902–1972) studied with teachers including Ferruccio Busoni, Paul Juon, Franz Schreker, and Anton Webern.
- Jack Behrens
- Elmer Bernstein
- Herbert Brün [pupils]
- John Carisi
- Jay Chernis [pupils]
- Gil Evans
- Morton Feldman [pupils]
- Matthew Greenbaum
- M. William Karlins [pupils]
- Robert D. Levin
- Boyd McDonald
- Leonard B. Meyer [pupils]
- George Russell
- Ralph Shapey
- Netty Simons
- David Tudor

=== Charles Wood ===
this teacher's teachers
C. Wood (1866–1926) studied with teachers including Hubert Parry and Charles Villiers Stanford.
- Arthur Bliss
- William Denis Browne
- Douglas Clarke [pupils]
- Harold Darke [pupils]
- Nicholas Gatty
- Armstrong Gibbs
- Eugene Aynsley Goossens [pupils]
- Patrick Hadley [pupils]
- William Henry Harris [pupils]
- Herbert Howells [pupils]
- Charles Herbert Kitson [pupils]
- Henry Ley [pupils]
- Elizabeth Maconchy [pupils]
- R. O. Morris [pupils]
- Humphrey Procter-Gregg
- Frank Tapp
- Michael Tippett [pupils]
- Ralph Vaughan Williams [pupils]

=== Daniel Sykes Wood ===
this teacher's teachers
Wood (1872–1927) studied with teachers including William Lewis Barrett.
- William Alwyn [pupils]

=== Henry Wood ===
this teacher's teachers
Wood (1869–1944) studied with teachers including George Cooper, Manuel Garcia, Walter Macfarren, and Ebenezer Prout.
- Arthur Hammond
- Alan Harverson
- William Ifor Jones
- King Palmer
- Ernest Read
- Margaret Ritchie

=== Hugh Wood ===
this teacher's teachers
Wood (1932–2021) studied with teachers including William Lloyd Webber, Anthony Milner, Iain Hamilton, and Mátyás Seiber.
- Melanie Ruth Daiken [pupils]
- Christopher Fox
- Adam Gorb [pupils]
- Tony Noakes

=== James Wood ===
this teacher's teachers
J. Wood (born 1953) studied with teachers including Nadia Boulanger.
- Piers Hellawell [pupils]

=== Joseph Woelfl ===
this teacher's teachers
Wölfl (1773–1812) studied with teachers including Leopold Mozart and Michael Haydn.
- Charles Neate [pupils]
- Cipriani Potter [pupils]

=== Rowsby Woof ===
this teacher's teachers
Woof (1883–1943) studied with teachers including Hans Wessely.
- Sidney Griller
- Frederick Grinke
- Felix Kok
- Nona Liddell
- Peter Mountain
- Jean Pougnet
- Priaulx Rainier [pupils]
- Rosemary Rapaport
- Colin Sauer
- David Carl Taylor
- William Waterhouse
- Meggie Albanesi

=== Paul Wranitzky ===
- Joseph Mayseder [pupils]

=== Richard Wüerst ===
this teacher's teachers
Wüerst (1824–1881) studied with teachers including Carl Friedrich Rungenhagen and Felix Mendelssohn.
- Agathe Backer-Grøndahl [pupils]
- Philipp Scharwenka [pupils]
- William Hall Sherwood [pupils]

=== Franz Wüllner ===
this teacher's teachers
Wüllner (1832–1902) studied with teachers including Anton Schindler.
- Volkmar Andreae [pupils]
- Fritz Brun [pupils]
- Jan van Gilse
- Lothar Kempter
- Bruno Klein [pupils]
- Hans von Koessler [pupils]
- Willem Mengelberg
- Karl Aagard Østvig
- Ernst von Schuch
- Alfred Sittard
- Arthur Smolian
- Otto Taubmann [pupils]
- Christopher Wilson

=== Johann Georg Wunderlich ===
this teacher's teachers
Wunderlich (1755–1819) studied with teachers including Felix Rault.
- Benoit Tranquille Berbiguier
- Joseph Guillou
- Jean-Louis Tulou

=== Charles Wuorinen ===
this teacher's teachers
Wuorinen (born 1938) studied with teachers including Jack Beeson, Otto Luening, and Vladimir Ussachevsky.
- Robert Bonfiglio
- Wendy Mae Chambers
- Michael Daugherty
- Eibhlís Farrell
- Aaron Jay Kernis [pupils]
- Peter Lieberson
- Caroline Lloyd
- Tobias Picker
- James Romig

=== Robert Wykes ===
this teacher's teachers
Wykes (born 1926) studied with teachers including Burrill Phillips, Cecil Effinger, Max Adkins, and A.D. Davenport.
- Robert Baker
- George Chave
- John Cubbage
- Greg Danner
- Robert Fruehwald
- Franklin Haspiel
- Michael Hunt
- Mary Ann Joyce [pupils]
- James Mabry
- Christopher Meister
- Gary Nelson
- Jocy d'Oliveira
- Ken Palmer
- David Patterson
- Rhian Samuel
- Kenneth Stallings
- Olly Wilson

=== Yehudi Wyner ===
this teacher's teachers
Wyner (born 1929) studied with teachers including Paul Hindemith, Walter Piston, Randall Thompson, Max Helfman, and Robert Strassburg.
- Chester Biscardi
- Craig Walsh

== X ==
=== Iannis Xenakis ===
- Georges Aperghis
- Miguel Ángel Coria
- Pascal Dusapin
- Julio Estrada
- Susan Frykberg
- Henning Lohner
- Eugene O'Brien [pupils]
- Suzanne Giraud

== Y ==
=== Kosaku Yamada ===
- Yasuji Kiyose [pupils]
- Jiang Wenye

=== Abram Yampolsky ===
- Mikhail Fichtenholz
- Elizabeth Gilels
- Boris Goldstein
- Leonid Kogan
- Henryk Kowalski
- Julian Sitkovetsky
- Yuri Yankelevich

=== Akio Yashiro ===
this teacher's teachers
Yashiro (1929–1976) studied with teachers including Nadia Boulanger, Kunihiko Hashimoto, and Tomojirō Ikenouchi.
- Shin’ichirō Ikebe

=== Anna Yesipova ===
this teacher's teachers
Yesipova (1851–1914) studied with teachers including Theodor Leschetizky and Karl Navrátil.
- Isidor Achron
- Alexander Borovsky
- Thomas de Hartmann
- Ignace Hilsberg
- Leonid Kreutzer [pupils]
- Leo Ornstein
- Leff Pouishnoff
- Sergei Prokofiev
- Artur Schnabel [pupils]
- Sergei Tarnowsky
- Józef Turczyński [pupils]
- Isabelle Vengerova [pupils]
- Anastasia Virsaladze
- Maria Yudina [pupils]

=== Michèl Yost ===
- Jean-Xavier Lefèvre
- Pedro Étienne Solère

=== La Monte Young ===
this teacher's teachers
Young (1935 — ...) studied with teachers including Andrew Imbrie, Richard Maxfield, Pran Nath, Seymour Shifrin, Leonard Stein, and Karlheinz Stockhausen.
- Lawrence Chandler
- Rhys Chatham
- Don Cherry
- Arnold Dreyblatt
- Michael Harrison
- Jon Gibson
- Catherine Christer Hennix
- Jung Hee Choi [pupils]
- Marcus Pal
- Ellen Arkbro
- Jon Mueller
- Charles Curtis
- Elodie Lauten
- Ben Neill
- Ned Sublette
- Yoshi Wada
- Michael Waller
- Daniel James Wolf

=== Eugène Ysaÿe ===
this teacher's teachers
Ysaÿe (1858–1931) studied with teachers including Lambert Massart, Rodolphe Massart, Henryk Wieniawski, and Henri Vieuxtemps.
- Oskar Back [pupils]
- Ernest Bloch [pupils]
- Mathieu Crickboom [pupils]
- Alfred Dubois [pupils]
- George Enescu [pupils]
- Josef Gingold
- Nathan Milstein
- Louis Persinger [pupils]
- Georgios Poniridis
- Leon Sametini [pupils]
- Jacques Thibaud [pupils]

=== Maria Yudina ===
this teacher's teachers
Yudina (1899–1970) studied with teachers including Vladimir Drozdov, Vasili Kalafati, Leonid Nikolayev, Maximilian Steinberg, and Anna Yesipova.
- Viktor Derevianko [pupils]

=== Isang Yun ===
this teacher's teachers
Yun (1917–1995) studied with teachers including Tony Aubin, Boris Blacher, Tomojiro Ikenouchi, Josef Rufer, and Reinhard Schwarz-Schilling.
- Jolyon Brettingham-Smith
- Raymond Deane
- Toshio Hosokawa
- Michalis Travlos
- Byung-dong Paik

== Z ==
=== Jan Zach ===
- Josef Seger [pupils]

=== Friedrich Wilhelm Zachow ===
- George Frideric Handel [pupils]
- Gottfried Kirchhoff
- Johann Philipp Krieger
- Johann Gotthilf Ziegler

=== Alfred Zamara ===
this teacher's teachers
Zamara (1863–1940) studied with teachers including Antonio Zamara.
- Joseph Schuëcker

=== Antonio Zamara ===
this teacher's teachers
Zamara (1829–1901) studied with teachers including Simon Sechter.
- Edmund Schuëcker [pupils]
- Heinrich Schuëcker
- Alfred Zamara [pupils]

=== Nikolai Zaremba ===
this teacher's teachers
Zaremba (1821–1879) studied with teachers including Adolf Bernhard Marx.
- Ella Adayevskaya
- Ippolit Al'tani
- Herman Laroche
- Nadezhda Rímskaya-Kórsakova
- Vasily Safonov [pupils]
- Nicolai Soloviev [pupils]
- Pyotr Ilyich Tchaikovsky [pupils]

=== Irina Zaritskaya ===
- Alba Ventura

=== Gioseffo Zarlino ===
- Giovanni Artusi
- Giovanni Croce
- Girolamo Diruta
- Vincenzo Galilei, the father of the astronomer
- Claudio Merulo
- Jan Pieterszoon Sweelinck

=== Ruth Zechlin ===
this teacher's teachers
Zechlin (1926–2007) studied with teachers including Johann Nepomuk David.
- Thomas Böttger
- Gerd Domhardt
- Georg Katzer

=== Jan Dismas Zelenka ===
this teacher's teachers
Zelenka (1679–1745) studied with teachers including Johann Joseph Fux.
- Johann Joachim Quantz [pupils]

=== Władysław Żeleński ===
- Henryk Opieński
- Roman Statkowski [pupils]
- Zygmunt Stojowski

=== Ferdinand Zellbell ===
this teacher's teachers
Zellbell, Jr. (1719–1780) studied with teachers including Georg Philipp Telemann.
- Olof Åhlström
- Elisabeth Olin

=== Carl Friedrich Zelter ===
this teacher's teachers
Zelter (1758–1832), autodidact studied with teachers including Carl Friedrich Christian Fasch and Johann Kirnberger.
- August Wilhelm Bach [pupils]
- Heinrich Dorn [pupils]
- Adolf Fredrik Lindblad [pupils]
- Adolf Bernhard Marx [pupils]
- Felix Mendelssohn [pupils]
- Fanny Mendelssohn
- Otto Nicolai [pupils]
- Julius Rietz [pupils]
- Carl Friedrich Rungenhagen [pupils]
- Ernst Adolf Wendt

=== Alexander Zemlinsky ===
this teacher's teachers
Zemlinsky (1871–1942) studied with teachers including Anton Door, Johann Nepomuk Fuchs, Robert Fuchs, Franz Krenn, and Wilhelm Rauch.
- Peter Herman Adler
- Erich Wolfgang Korngold
- Hans Krása
- Alma Mahler
- Jan Meyerowitz
- Josef Rufer [pupils]
- Arnold Schoenberg [pupils]
- Viktor Ullmann
- Karl Weigl

=== Bernhard Ziehn ===
- John J. Becker
- John Alden Carpenter
- Eleanor Everest Freer
- Julius Gold
- Hugo Kaun
- Wilhelm Middelschulte [pupils]
- Otto Wolf
- Fannie Bloomfield Zeisler

=== Efrem Zimbalist ===
this teacher's teachers
Zimbalist (1889–1985) studied with teachers including Leopold Auer.
- Shmuel Ashkenasi [pupils]
- Leonid Bolotine
- Jascha Brodsky [pupils]
- John Dalley
- Aaron Rosand
- Oscar Shumsky
- Joseph Silverstein
- Felix Slatkin
- Michael Tree
- Harold Wippler
- Helen Kwalwasser

=== Bernd Alois Zimmermann ===
this teacher's teachers
Zimmermann (1918–1970) studied with teachers including Wolfgang Fortner and René Leibowitz.
- Clarence Barlow [pupils]
- Johannes Fritsch
- Paavo Heininen
- York Höller [pupils]
- Robin Maconie
- Eugene O'Brien [pupils]
- Atli Heimir Sveinsson
- Dimitri Terzakis

=== Pierre-Joseph-Guillaume Zimmerman ===
this teacher's teachers
Zimmermann (1785–1853) studied with teachers including François-Adrien Boieldieu and Luigi Cherubini.
- Charles-Valentin Alkan [pupils]
- Georges Bizet
- César Franck [pupils]
- Alexandre Goria
- Charles Gounod [pupils]
- Louis Lacombe
- Louis James Alfred Lefébure-Wély
- Antoine François Marmontel [pupils]
- Jean-Henri Ravina
- Eugenie de Santa Coloma Sourget
- Ambroise Thomas [pupils]
- Józef Wieniawski

=== Niccolò Antonio Zingarelli ===
this teacher's teachers
Zingarelli (1752–1837) studied with teachers including Fedele Fenaroli and Alessandro Speranza.
- Giuseppe Balducci
- Vincenzo Bellini
- Carlo Conti [pupils]
- Michael Costa
- Alessandro Curmi
- Saverio Mercadante [pupils]
- Francesco Morlacchi
- Louis Niedermeyer [pupils]
- Francesco Pollini
- Luigi Felice Rossi

=== Djuro Zivkovic ===
- Jacob Mühlrad

=== Carl Friedrich Zöllner ===
this teacher's teachers
Zöllner (1800–1860) studied with teachers including Johann Gottfried Schicht.
- Ferdinand Böhme [pupils]

=== Nikolai Zverev ===
this teacher's teachers
Zverev (1832–1893) studied with teachers including Alexandre Dubuque and Adolf von Henselt.
- Aleksandr Goldenweiser [pupils]
- Konstantin Igumnov [pupils]
- Fyodor Keneman
- Sergei Rachmaninoff [pupils]
- Leonid Sabaneyev [pupils]
- Alexander Scriabin [pupils]
- Alexander Siloti [pupils]

=== Bernard Zweers ===
this teacher's teachers
Zweers (1854–1924) studied with teachers including Salomon Jadassohn.
- Hendrik Andriessen [pupils]
- Sem Dresden [pupils]
