= Rowsby Woof =

English violinist and music educator (1883 - 1943)

Edward Rowsby Woof (18 January 1883 – 31 December 1943) was an English violinist and music educator. He became professor of violin at the Royal Academy of Music (FRAM) in London, and wrote instructional works on violin technique and violin studies, as well as some pieces for violin. Among his pupils were Sidney Griller, Frederick Grinke, Arthur Kennedy, Felix Kok, Nona Liddell, Peter Mountain, Jean Pougnet, Priaulx Rainier, Rosemary Rapaport, Colin Sauer, David Carl Taylor of the Stratton Quartet and William Waterhouse. He also tutored the actress Meggie Albanesi.

== Early life ==
Woof was born in Coalbrookdale, son of Edward Woof and his wife Sarah (née Rowsby). He studied violin with Hans Wessely at the Royal Academy of Music.

== Career ==
From information in prospectuses of the Royal Academy of Music.

- Violin sub-professor: 1904-1905

In 1904 Woof won the Messrs. Hill & Sons’ Prize, and the Charles Rube Prize for quartet playing with Ivy L. St. Aubyn Angove, James T. Lockyer, and B. Walton O'Donnell. Woof was a Wessely Exhibitioner at the RAM. Woof was also awarded the Royal Academy of Music's Bronze Medal for Violin in 1904, the Silver Medal for Violin in 1905 as well as the Hannah Mayer Fitzroy Prize, and the James Tubbs and Son’s Prize and the Dove Prize in 1906. In 1907, he made his debut at Bechstein Hall (now Wigmore Hall).

- Violin professor: 1909-1939
- Viola professor: 1912-1939
- Ensemble playing classes: 1914-1923

== Personal life ==
In 1911, Woof married Victoria Mary Fox, a music teacher. They had no children. He died 31 December 1943 aged 60.

== Legacy ==
The Rowsby Woof Prize for Royal Academy of Music violin students, founded by his wife in 1944, was awarded annually in the years 1945 to 1963. The Prize Board listing the awardees was added to the RAM Museum's collection in 2011. Recipients include Colin Sauer (1945), Beryl Kimber (1949), Clarence Myerscough (1952), Brendan O' Reilly (1956) and John Georgiadis (1959) of the Gabrieli String Quartet, and Roy Malan (1963), founding concertmaster of the San Francisco Ballet Orchestra.

Rowsby Woof is listed in the Musicians' Book of Remembrance in the Musician's Chapel at St Sepulchre-without-Newgate.

== Selected works ==
Compositions

- Diamond Jubilee, children's song, words by S. R. W., R.Cocks & Co.: London [1897]
- Reverie, for violin & piano, C. Woodhouse: London, 1909
- Little Waltz in first position, for violin & piano, C. Woodhouse: London, 1910
- Scherzo, for violin & piano, C. Woodhouse: London, 1910
- Scherzo, for piano, Cary & Co.: London, 1912
- Swinging, for violin & piano, Cary & Co.: London, 1913
- Forsaken, for violin & piano. Cary & Co.: London, 1914
- The North Wind, for violin & piano, J. Williams: London, 1919
- A Romp, for violin & piano, J. Williams: London, 1919
- Four Fancies, for violin & piano. I Caprice II Romance III Minuet IV In church, Anglo-French Music Co.: London, 1920
- Valse Capriccio, for violin & piano, J. Williams: London, 1927

Arrangements

- Bach, J. S.: Largo and Allegro, arr. violin & piano
- Paganini, N. Caprice, arr. violin & piano [1922]
- Geminiani, F.: Sonata Op.4 No. 10, Two Minuets [1927]

Instructional works

- The First Position Six short pieces for beginners for violin. Anglo-French Music Co.: London, 1910
- Technique and Interpretation in Violin-playing [1920] ISBN 978-1-406-79686-5
- Thirty Studies of Moderate Difficulty for Violin ISBN 978-1-854-72080-1
- Fifty Elementary Studies for Violin ISBN 978-1-854-72401-4
- Official book of Scales and Arpeggios for the Violin ed. R. Woof, Associated Board of the Royal Schools of Music: London, 1922
