= Theatre music =

Music composed or adapted for performance in theatres

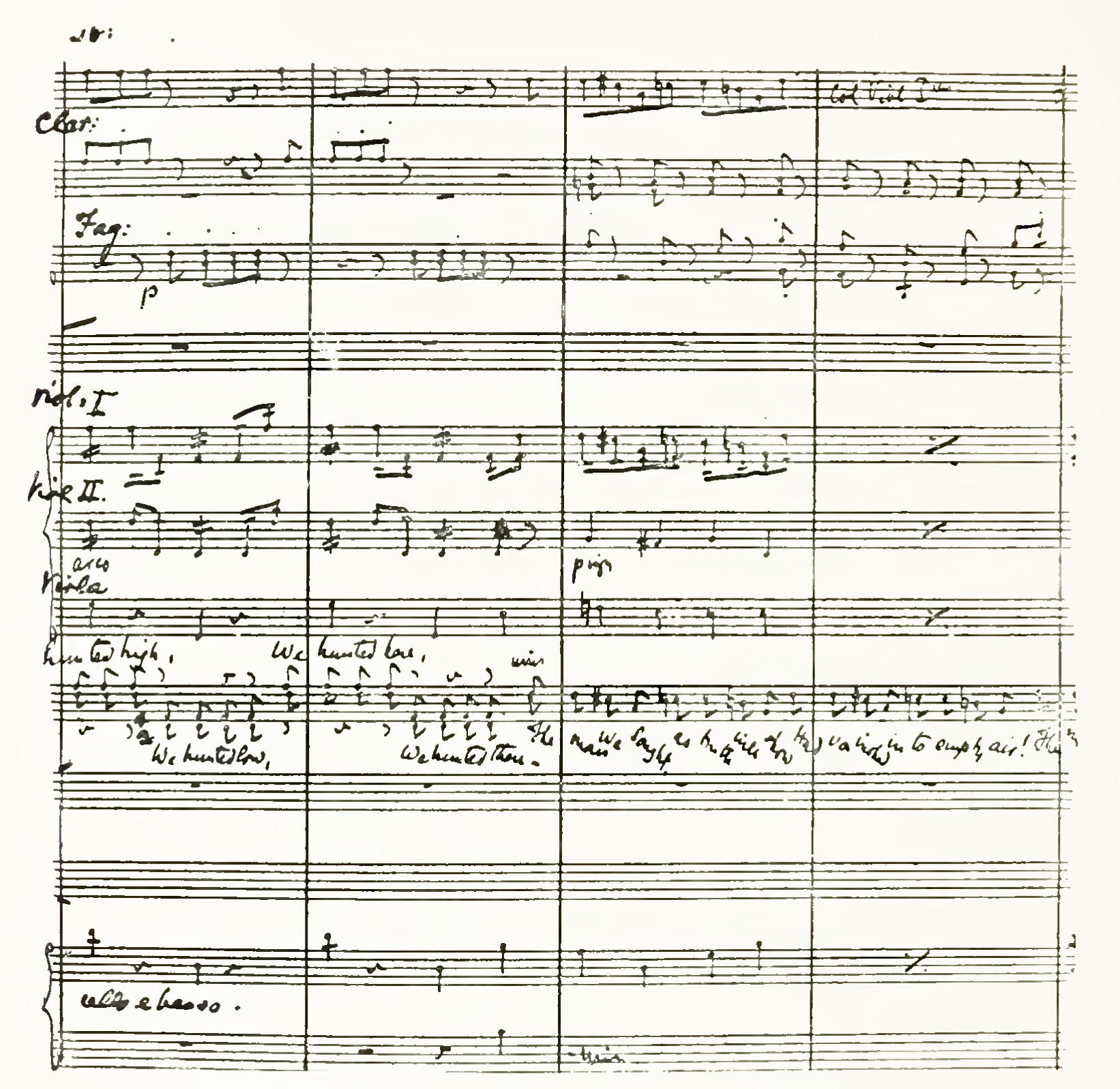
Page from Arthur Sullivan's manuscript of the Act 1 finale of The Yeomen of the Guard (1888)

Theatre music refers to a wide range of music composed or adapted for performance in theatres. Genres of theatre music include opera, ballet and several forms of musical theatre, from pantomime to operetta and modern stage musicals and revues. Another form of theatre music is incidental music, which, as in radio, film and television, is used to accompany the action or to separate the scenes of a play. The physical embodiment of the music is called a score, which includes the music and, if there are lyrics, it also shows the lyrics.

== History ==
Since the earliest days of the theatre, music has played an important part in stage drama. In Greek drama in the fifth century BC, choric odes were written to be chanted and danced between the spoken sections of both tragedies and comedies. Only fragments of the music have survived. Attempts to recreate the form for revivals from the Renaissance to modern times have branched in several directions. Composers from Andrea Gabrieli to Mendelssohn to Vaughan Williams have composed chorus music for productions of plays by Sophocles, Aristophanes and others. Playwrights including Racine, Yeats and Brecht wrote original plays in styles derived from ancient drama, with sung commentaries by a chorus or narrator. In late 16th century Florence, attempts to revive ancient Greek drama, with sung vocal contributions, developed into the modern genre of opera. Folk theatre has always deployed dance music and song.

In the 16th and 17th centuries, theatre music was performed during the action of plays and as afterpieces. Christopher Wilson, discussing Shakespeare's use of music, lists "stage music" (fanfares to introduce important characters or accompany battle scenes), "magic music" (as in the lullaby in A Midsummer Night's Dream), "character music" (as in Twelfth Night, illustrating the high, low, sad or merry natures of the characters) and "atmospheric music" (such as Ariel's "Where the bee sucks", in The Tempest). By the early 18th century, music was firmly established as part of practically all theatrical performances in Europe, whether of opera, dance, or spoken drama. Theatres were built with orchestra pits, and music was either specially composed for the production or appropriated and arranged from existing material.

The writer Roger Savage notes in Grove's Dictionary of Music and Musicians: "The classic forms of Asian theatre from India to Japan rely heavily on music, as do the dramatic rituals of sub-Saharan Africa and of the indigenous peoples of the Americas." In Western theatre genres, Savage writes that music features importantly in medieval liturgical drama, ballet, opera, pantomime, Singspiel, melodrama, Victorian burlesque, music hall, vaudeville, variety show, operetta, Edwardian musical comedy, the modern musical including rock musicals, and other forms of musical theatre. In common with radio, cinema and television, the theatre has long made use of incidental music to accompany spoken drama.

== See also ==
- Show tune
- Aria
- Sheet music
- Film score

== Bibliography ==
- Green, Stanley. Encyclopedia of the Musical Theatre. New York: Dodd, Mead, 1976
