= Masayuki Koga =

Masayuki Koga (born in Omuta City, Japan) is a shakuhachi player and former member of the Ensemble Nipponia. He studied Kinko shakuhachi with Kiichi Koga, his father, and Tozan Ryu shakuhachi with Kazan Saka, and teaches both schools. His students include Richard Marriott.

He is the general director of the Japanese Music Institute of America, located in San Francisco and Berkeley, which he founded in 1981. Since 1995, the institute has taught shakuhachi, koto, and taiko.
