= Henryk Kowalski =

Polish violinist and composer (1911–1982)

- Born: Henryk Kowalski; July 2, 1911; Suwałki, Poland
- Died: January 24, 1982 (aged 70) Providence, Rhode Island, US
- Genre: Classical
- Occupation: Concert violinist
- Instrument: Violin
- Years active: 1921–1982

Henryk Kowalski (Polish pronunciation: [ˈxɛnrɨk kɔˈvalskʲi]; July 2, 1911 – January 24, 1982) was a Polish Jewish violinist and composer.

== Biography ==
=== Early childhood ===
Kowalski learned how to play the violin at the age of four from his father, who was the conductor in a regimental orchestra. By the age of seven, he had already given many violin recitals in various Polish cities, and was widely considered to be a child prodigy. When he was ten, Kowalski appeared as a soloist with the Warsaw Philharmonic Orchestra, performing music by Niccolò Paganini. He began to study music at the Warsaw Conservatory under Professor Joseph Jarzebski—a former student of the famous Leopold Auer—and traveled to Paris to continue his studies with violinist Jacques Thibaud.

=== Early career ===
In the years leading up to the outbreak of World War II, Kowalski was noted for his performances with Polskie Radio, the national broadcasting organization. Performances he made on the radio were broadcast live across the country, and reached audiences in Germany, Czechoslovakia, Russia, and Lithuania. He was also engaged in popular music, and composed popular songs.

When war finally began in 1939, Kowalski was arrested by Germans in Węgrów while on his way to join his family in Brest-Litovsk. He managed to escape to Brest-Litovsk, which had been occupied by Soviet troops. There he met the great Russian violinist Miron Polyakin, who wrote a letter recommending him as a very talented artist. Polyakin's approval helped his admittance to the Moscow Conservatory, where he continued his studies with Abram Yampolsky, a well-known violin teacher.

=== Hiding ===
Kowalski continued to perform in Soviet-occupied territory, which now included areas of Poland as a result of the Molotov–Ribbentrop Pact. In 1941, Germany launched an invasion of the Soviet Union. At the time, Kowalski was in the city of Lvov with a group of other Polish musicians, and he was again arrested. Members of the Gestapo tortured him in captivity, and he was sentenced to death. While being transported to the place of execution, Kowalski and another inmate attacked their guard and escaped. After wandering for a long time, he found refuge with a family of peasants near Drohobych, now part of modern Ukraine. He spent 20 months hiding during the day in a shelter dug under the peasants' pigsty. After this long period of hiding, he joined a group of Russian partisans, with whom he remained for the rest of the war.

=== Post-war ===
At the end of the war, Kowalski traveled to Vienna, where he again took up a career as a soloist. The Austrian press hailed him as a great violinist. He was admired not only for his virtuosity, but also for his ability to perform two violin concertos in a single performance. He performed mainly with the Viennese Great Radio Symphony Orchestra, conducted by Carl Ettie. Before returning to Poland, he embarked on a very successful concert tour in Czechoslovakia, and was compared by his reviewers to the most prominent violinists of the era. When he arrived in Poland once again, his return was heralded by enthusiastic articles in the Polish press. He began to perform again for Polskie Radio, and gave many concerts around the country.

=== Late career and emigration ===
In 1956, Kowalski was sent to the Soviet Union as part of a Russian program promoting cultural exchange with other countries. He continued to perform while in Russia with various orchestras, and received excellent reviews.

In 1957, he emigrated to Israel with his wife and son. He became a violin teacher at the Music Conservatory in Haifa, but continued to tour in Israel and in Europe. The Israeli press reviewed him favorably, as the following excerpt from a review from the Jerusalem Post attests:

Today, thin spread are the God-gifted Jewish violinists who formerly grew like mushrooms from the soil. ... With Kowalski, Eastern Europe, once an inexhaustible reservoir, has delivered us one of the last pearls of Jewish musicians. This has been recognized in Vienna ... and hopefully ... this pearl will soon get the setting it deserves.

From 1962’1963, Kowalski moved with his family to the Netherlands. There, he worked for the Netherlands Radio Union Orchestra in Hilversum. After this period, he again moved to Israel, but the outbreak and aftermath of the Six-Day War convinced him and his family to emigrate to the United States. In April 1971, he settled down in Providence, Rhode Island, and took up a position at the music department of Brown University as a violin instructor. He and his family received American citizenship on July 15, 1976. He continued to receive recognition for his talents in America, and on February 6, 1978, he was invited with his wife and other distinguished Americans of Polish descent to the White House by President Jimmy Carter.

Kowalski died suddenly due to hemorrhage of the upper intestinal tract, at the age of 70, on January 24, 1982, in Providence, Rhode Island.

== Family ==
During World War II, Kowalski lost almost his entire family. Both of his parents, Abram and Dora, his three sisters, Lonia, Genia, and Danusia, and his brother David were killed by German soldiers in Brest Litovsk in 1942, when the Jewish ghetto there was liquidated. His fourth sister Halina (a cellist) and her two daughters, Lucyna and Henryka survived. Her non-Jewish husband, violinist Henryk Trzonek, was executed by Germans in Warsaw in 1943.

Kowalski was married to Polish physician Stanislawa Maria Rossa. They had two sons, Henry and Michael.

== Bibliography ==
- Słownik muzyków polskich T. 1, A-Ł/ red. nacz. Józef Chomiński; oprac. Elżbieta Dziębowska [et al.]; Instytut Sztuki Polskiej Akademii Nauk – hasło: Henryk Kowalski, Wyd. Polskie Wydawnictwo Muzyczne, Kraków 1964
- "Aria na wiolonczelę", 'Aria for Cello' by Włodzimierz Kusik, Radwan 2010
