= Watson Forbes =

Scottish violist (1909–1997)

External audio
- Shellac recordings with Watson Forbes in the Online Archive of the Österreichische Mediathek

Watson Douglas Buchanan Forbes (16 November 1909 – 25 June 1997) was a Scottish violist and classical music arranger. From 1964 to 1974 he was Head of Music for BBC Scotland.

== Early life ==
Watson Forbes was born 16 November 1909 in St Andrews, where his parents kept a jeweller's shop. He first learnt the violin from his father, who was a Scottish country fiddler. Showing promise, at the age of 16 he was sent to the Royal Academy of Music in London, where he studied violin, viola and composition. His composition professor at the RAM was Theodore Holland, who wrote a Suite for Forbes.

Forbes had a number of violin teachers at the RAM. The first was Sydney Robjohns, followed by Editha Knocker, then Paul Beard and finally Marjorie Hayward. At the Academy, he played in the first orchestra and shared the first desk of violins with Vivian Dunn. He was part of the premier string quartet at the RAM, with David Carl Taylor playing second violin, Gwynne Edwards on Viola and David Ffrancon Thomas on cello. The quartet won the Sir Edward Cooper and RAM Club Prizes in 1929 and 1930. They took outside engagements including a performance at 11 Downing Street. Forbes was encouraged to take up the viola by Herbert Withers, who coached the quartet. He gradually specialised on the viola, for both musical and pragmatic reasons.

In 1930, he went to Písek in Czechoslovakia to study with Otakar Ševčík, whose intricate system of exercises revolutionised string playing; he felt he had benefited enormously from this period: "Sevcik taught me how to practise and how to tackle difficult passages." After his return to England, Forbes had lessons from Raymond Jeremy and Albert Sammons. Of Albert Sammons, Forbes said: "He was marvellous. He taught me how to perform—how to put music across to an audience."

== Career ==
The invitation to join the Stratton Quartet set the direction of his career. The Stratton was Elgar's preferred quartet, and their recordings in 1933, of his String Quartet and Piano Quintet were the music he chose to listen to on his deathbed. Forbes remained with the Stratton for the rest of its existence as such.

At the start of the Second World War, Forbes was joint leader of the London Symphony Orchestra, but from 1940 onwards he joined the RAF Symphony Orchestra which contained a number of small groups of chamber music players. He toured the UK in a piano quintet which included Denis Matthews, Frederick Grinke and James Whitehead. He also made many appearances in Myra Hess's concerts at the National Gallery. After the war, he continued with the Stratton quartet, but now, following the departure of George Stratton, renamed the Aeolian Quartet. He also played with other groups, and as a soloist. In 1947, for instance, he gave the premiere of the Viola Sonata by his contemporary Robin Orr in Cambridge, and in 1955 he premiered the award-winning Fantasia for Viola and Piano Op29, dedicated to him by its composer, Kenneth Leighton.

In 1950 he was made a Fellow of the Royal Academy of Music (FRAM) in London, and in 1954 he became professor of viola and chamber music there. He made his Proms debut as a soloist on 14 September 1956 playing the world premiere of John Greenwood's Viola Concerto. In his recitals, he often played on the rare Stradivarius Archinto viola (1696) owned by the Royal Academy.

In 1964 Forbes moved to Glasgow to take up the post of Head of Music for BBC Scotland. There he safeguarded and expanded the BBC Scottish Symphony Orchestra, then under threat, and fostered the Scottish musical culture of the day (including traditional Scottish music, with a fiddle competition in Perth at which Yehudi Menuhin was chief adjudicator).

Throughout his working life, but especially in retirement, he worked on one of his most enduring legacies as a musician, namely an extensive series of arrangements (including pieces by Rameau and Bach) to expand the viola repertoire, and a series of educational collections for other instruments. He also made many solo recordings, including the Viola Sonata by Arthur Bliss and the Sussex Lullaby by Alan Richardson, with the composer at the piano.

In 1970 he was made an honorary Doctor of Music by the University of Glasgow and in 1972 was awarded the Cobbett Memorial Prize for services to chamber music.

== Personal life ==
In 1937 Forbes married Mary Hunt (died 1997). They had two sons, Sebastian, who became a composer, and Rupert, who became a singer. The marriage was dissolved, and secondly he married Jean Beckwith. Forbes died on 25 June 1997 in Moreton-in-Marsh, at the age of 87.
