= Ernest Hutcheson =

Australian pianist, composer and teacher

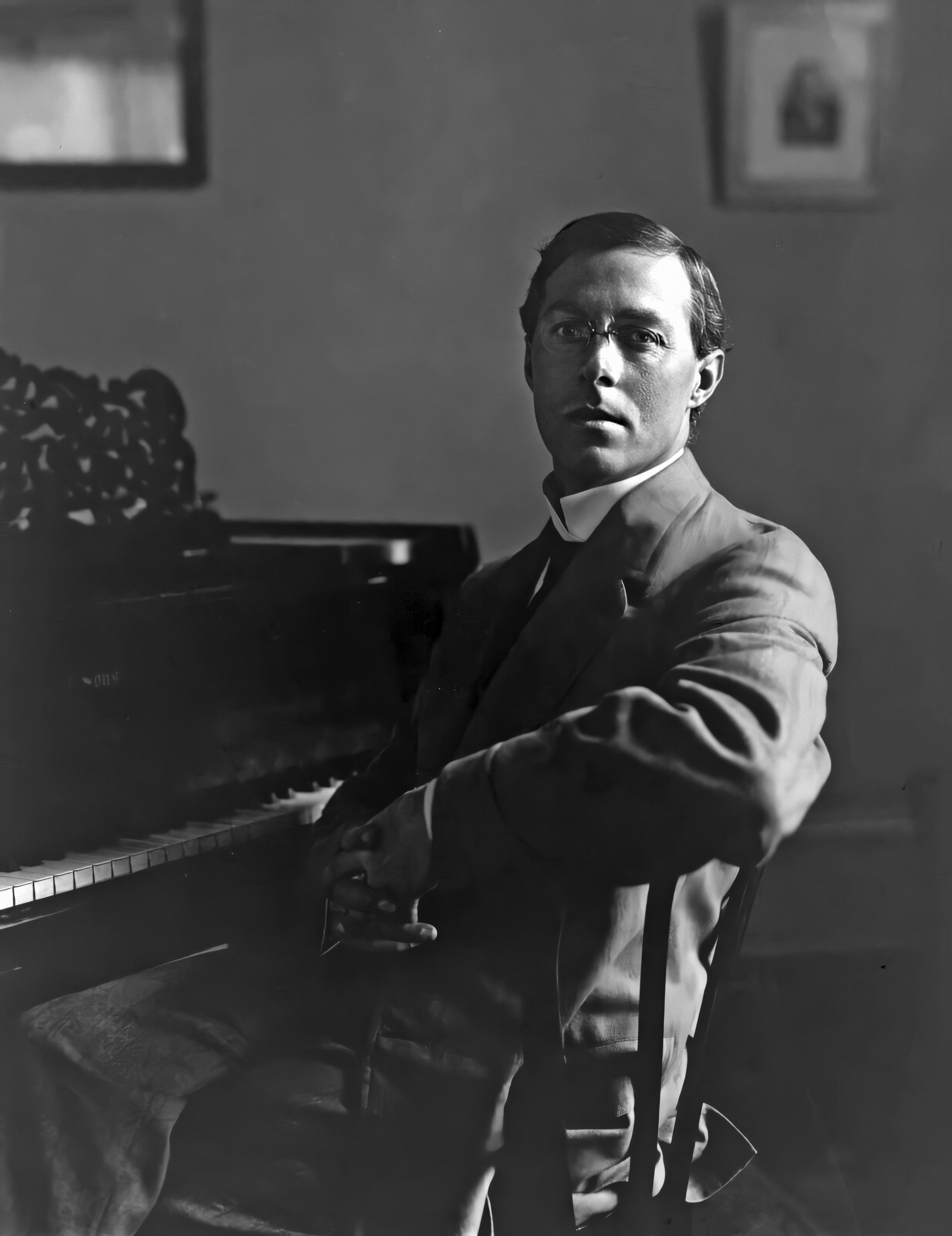
Ernest Hutcheson

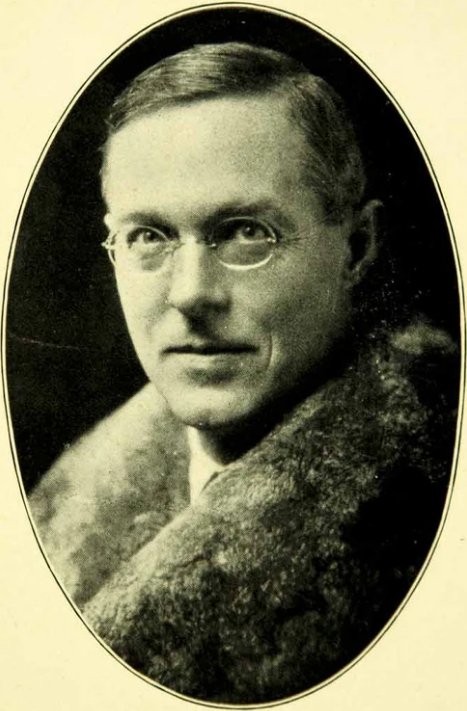
1925

Ernest Hutcheson (20 July 1871 – 9 February 1951) was an Australian pianist, composer and teacher.

== Biography ==
Hutcheson was born in Melbourne, and toured there as a child prodigy at the age of five. He later travelled to Leipzig and entered the Leipzig Conservatory at the age of fourteen to study with Carl Reinecke, Bernhard Stavenhagen (a pupil of Franz Liszt) and Bruno Zwintscher. He was part of the London music circuit in 1896 and 1897. Prior to the outbreak of World War I he taught at the Stern Conservatory in Berlin, but in 1914 he settled in New York City, where he made his US debut.

He is believed to have been the first pianist to play three concertos of Ludwig van Beethoven in a single concert: his performances of Beethoven's third, fourth and fifth with the New York Symphony Orchestra in the Aeolian Hall in 1919.

He became a member of the faculty at the Juilliard School, and successively Dean (1926–1937) and President (1937–1945) of the school. At Juilliard, he championed the use of radio musical broadcasts in education.

He taught many first-rate students. One of these many students was Mary Ann Craft, who later taught the prodigy Edgar Coleman during his formative years. Two other students who went on to important pianistic careers were the American Abram Chasins, and the Australian Bruce Hungerford. He also taught Muriel Kerr, a winner of the Naumberg Competition who made her Carnegie Hall debut 5 December 1928 in Rachmaninoff's Concerto No. 2 with the Philharmonic SO of New York conducted by Willem Mengelberg. She became Hutcheson's assistant at Juilliard and later toured under Columbia Artists Management, settling finally in Los Angeles where she taught at the University of Southern California. Hutcheson was a member of the Phi Mu Alpha Sinfonia music fraternity.

== At Chautauqua ==
Hutcheson was also associated with the Chautauqua School of Music at the Chautauqua Institution in Western New York State. Hutcheson provided a much needed refuge for George Gershwin at Chautauqua during the stressful period of composing and refining the Piano Concerto in F. Since Gershwin was already very famous as a successful writer of popular works and musical shows, he was constantly besieged by admirers. Further, he had never scored a large symphonic work (the earlier Rhapsody in Blue had been scored for jazz band by Gershwin, but was orchestrated by Ferde Grofé) and was under great stress from the pressing deadline expectations from Walter Damrosch, conductor of the New York Symphony, who had commissioned the Concerto in F. Thanks to Ernest Hutcheson's kind offer of seclusion for Gershwin at Chautauqua where his quarters were declared off limits to everyone until 4 p.m. daily, Gershwin was able to successfully complete his piano concerto on time.

== Works ==
Ernest Hutcheson wrote concertos for piano; 2 pianos; and violin, and many solo piano works, such as a transcription of Wagner's Ride of the Valkyries. His music has been little heard in concert or on recordings, but his Australian compatriot Ian Munro has recorded some of his piano pieces.

Hutcheson wrote important books The Literature of the Piano, The Elements of Piano Technique, A Musical Guide to Richard Wagner's Ring of the Nibelung, and Elektra, by Richard Strauss: a Guide to the Opera with Musical Examples from the Score, among others.
