= Richard Marriott =

American composer (born 1951)

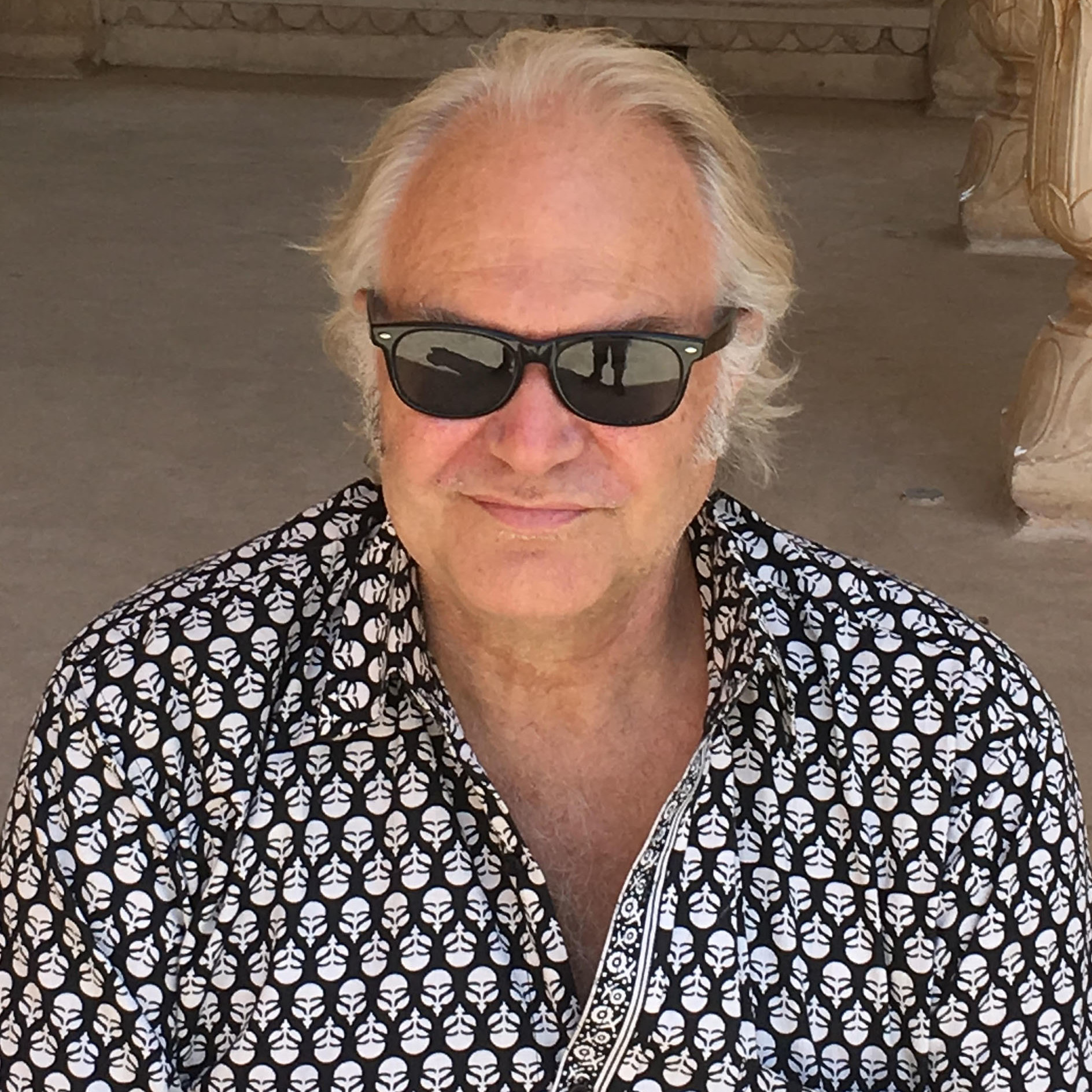
- Marriott in India, 2017

Background information
- Born: October 29, 1951 (age 74); Cleveland, Ohio, U.S.
- Genres: Contemporary Classical; Jazz; Experimental; Film scores
- Occupation: Composer
- Years active: 1980–present
- Website: www.richardmarriott.com

Richard Marriott (born 1951) is an American composer and performer. He has composed for film, television, dance, theater, opera, installations and video games. He is the founder and artistic director of the Club Foot Orchestra, an important modern ensemble for live music performance with silent films. His teachers include Dominick Argento and Paul Fetler at the University of Minnesota, Pauline Oliveros at UCSD, North Indian sarod master Ali Akbar Khan, shakuhachi master Masayuki Koga, and Balinese composers Nyoman Windha and Made Subandi. Marriott was a member of Snakefinger's History of the Blues and has recorded with The Residents, Brazilian Girls, "Singer at Large" Johnny J. Blair, and many others. He performs on brass and woodwind instruments, Western and Asian.

Composing credits also include music for the feature film Rising Sun, music for the CBS series The Twisted Tales of Felix the Cat, the score for the 1988 Academy Award nominated short film Silver into Gold and the score for Legong: Dance of the Virgins commissioned by Gamelan Sekar Jaya and composed for Balinese gamelan and Western instrumentation. He was employed as a staff composer for Atari Games 1992–1997, where amongst other things he composed the music for Mace the Dark Age and contributed compositions for LeapFrog Enterprises. He has worked with California-based choreographer Della Davidson since 1991, and in New York with Yoshiko Chuma's School of Hard Knocks and choreographer Yin Mei.

Many of his recent compositions feature a synthesis of Asian and Western elements. A collaboration with Beijing-based librettist Xu Ying, entitled Prince Lan Ling, is scored for Western Symphonic Orchestra, Chinese instruments and singers, chorus and dancers. Operas include Divide Light (with visual artist Lesley Dill) and Passion of Leyla (with librettist Ruth Margraff), and the experimental opera God Machine. Metropolis Violin Concerto premiered in 2015 with violinist Alisa Rose. The Klezmorim Bass Concerto premiered in 2018 with soloist Gary Karr and the Gonzaga University Orchestra, conducted by Kevin Hekmatpanah. The Ghost Ship Cello Concerto also premiered in 2018, with soloist Matthew Linaman and the Oakland Symphony with conductor Michael Morgan.
