= Clarence Myerscough =

British violinist

- Born: 27 October 1930; London, United Kingdom
- Died: 8 October 2000 (aged 69) London, United Kingdom
- Occupation: violinist
- Years active: 1951–2000

Clarence Myerscough (born London, 27 October 1930; died London, 8 October 2000) was a British violinist.

He studied at the Royal Academy of Music (where in 1952 he won the Rowsby Woof Prize) and the Paris Conservatoire under Frederick Grinke and Rene Benedetti. He won the All England Violin Competition in the Festival of Britain (1951) and came second in the Carl Flesch Competition (1952).

He later formed the Fidelio Quartet together with his brother, the violist Henry Myerscough, and was known as much for his chamber music performances and recordings as for solo work. He frequently performed works by Niccolò Paganini, whose birthday he shared.

He taught for over 35 years at the Academy, becoming head of the string section, as well as teaching each weekend at The King's School, Canterbury.

He played a violin by luthier Giovanni Paolo Maggini, which on his death passed to his daughter Nadia, also a violinist, who performed with her father many times.
