= Sergei Vasilenko =

Soviet Russian composer

- Сергей Василенко
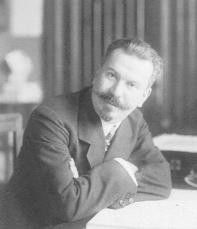
- Vasilenko in c. 1910
- Born: 30 March 1872; Moscow, Russian Empire
- Died: 11 March 1956 (aged 83); Moscow, Russian SFSR, Soviet Union
- Education: Imperial Moscow University (1896)
- Occupations: Composer; conductor

Sergei Nikiforovich Vasilenko (Russian: Сергей Никифорович Василенко; 30 March [O.S. 18 March] 1872 – 11 March 1956) was a Russian and Soviet composer, conductor and music teacher whose compositions showed a strong tendency towards mysticism.

Vasilenko was born in Moscow and originally studied law at Moscow State University, but then changed direction and studied at the Moscow Conservatory from 1896 to 1901 as a pupil of Sergei Taneyev and Mikhail Ippolitov-Ivanov. From 1903 to 1904 he was the conductor of a private opera house in Moscow. For several years he was the organiser and conductor of the Historic Concerts of the Russian Musical Society. He then became a professor at the Moscow Conservatory, where his students included Aram Khachaturian, Nikolai Roslavets, Nikolai Rakov and Aarre Merikanto.

Vasilenko was awarded two Orders of the Red Banner of Labour as well as the title People's Artist of the RSFSR. In 1947, he was awarded the Stalin Prize. He died in Moscow in 1956.

== Selected works ==
=== Opera ===
- Skazaniye o grade velikom Kitezhe i tikhom ozere Svetoyare (Tale of the Great City of Kitezh and the Quiet Lake Svetoyar) (1902; originally a cantata, Op. 5)
- Sïn solntsa (The Son of the Sun), Op. 63 (1929)
- Khristofor Kolumb (Christopher Columbus), Op. 80 (1933)
- Buran (The Snow Storm), Op. 98 (1939)
- Velikiy kanal (The Grand Canal), Op. 101 (1939)
- Suvorov, Op. 102 (1942)

=== Ballet ===
- In the Rays of the Sun, Op. 17 (1925–26)
- Noya, Op. 42 (1923)
- Joseph the Handsome, Op. 50 (1925)
- Lola, Op. 52 (1926)
- The Gypsies, Op. 90 (1936; after Alexander Pushkin)
- The Frog Princess, Op. 103 (1941)
- Mirandolina

=== Choral ===
- Cantata Legend of the Great City of Kitezh and the Quiet Lake Svetoyar, Op, 5 (later turned into an opera that anticipated Nikolai Rimsky-Korsakov's work on the same subject)
- Cantata for the 20th Anniversary of the October Revolution, Op. 92 (1937)

=== Incidental music ===
- Euripides' Alcestis (written as a schoolboy)
- other works

=== Orchestral ===
- Three Bloody Battles, Op. 1 (1900)
- Epic Poem, Op. 4 (1900–03)
- Symphony No. 1 in G minor, Op. 10 (1904–06)
- The Garden of Death, symphonic poem after Oscar Wilde, Op. 13 (1907–08)
- Sappho, symphonic poem, Op. 14 (1909)
- Flight of the Witches, symphonic poem, Op. 15 (1908–09)
- Au soleil, symphonic poem, Op. 17
- Fantastic Waltz, Op. 18 (1912)
- Symphony No. 2 in F major, Op. 22
- Suite on lute music of the 14th to 17th centuries, Op. 24 (1914)
- Zodiac, suite on French themes of the 18th century, Op. 27 (1914)
- Exotic Suite, Op. 29 (1915–16)
- Indian Suite, Op. 42bis
- Chinese Suite, No. 1, Op. 60 (1928)
- Turkmenian Suite, Op. 68 (1931)
- Chinese Suite, No. 2, Op. 70 (1931)
- Merry-go-round, 8 Soviet dances, Op. 73 (1932)
- The Soviet East, suite, Op. 75 (1932)
- Red Army Rhapsody, Op. 77 (1932)
- film music for Boris Barnet's Outskirts (1933)
- Slavonic Rhapsody (1937)

=== Concertante ===
- Violin Concerto in D minor, Op. 25 (1910–13)
- Concerto for symphony orchestra and brass band (1928)
- Suite on Russian Folk Themes, balalaika and accordion (1928)
- Concerto for Trumpet and Orchestra, Op. 113
- Piano Concerto in F-sharp minor, Op. 128

=== Chamber ===
- String Quartet in A, Op. 3 (c. 1901)
- Sonata in D minor for viola and piano, Op. 46 (1923); version for violin and piano (1955)
- String Quartet in E minor, Op. 58 (c. 1928)
- Quartet on Turkmenian Themes, for flute, oboe (English horn), clarinet, bassoon and percussion ad lib., Op. 65 (1932)
- Piano Trio in A, Op. 74 (1932)
- Japanese Suite for oboe, clarinet, bassoon, xylophone and piano, Op. 66a (1938)
- Chinese Sketches, woodwind, Op. 78 (1938)
- Quartet on American Themes, woodwind, Op. 79 (1938)

=== Military band ===
- March of the Red Army, Op. 64 (1929)
- Fantasy on Revolutionary Songs of the West, Op. 71 (1931)

=== Other ===
- songs (including settings of Māori, Sinhalese, Indian and Japanese tunes)
- folksong arrangements (including Negro and Turkmenian melodies)
- piano pieces

== Recordings ==
- Sergei Vasilenko: Viola and Piano Music (Complete) - Viola Sonata, Op. 46 / Lullaby / 4 Pieces on Themes of Lute Music of the 16-17th Centuries, Op. 35 / Sleeping River / Oriental Dance, Op. 47 / Suite Zodiakus I.A.S, Op. 27 / 4 Pieces (1953) - Elena Artamonova (viola) and Nicholas Walker (piano). Toccata Classics TOCC0127, released 2011
- "The Russian Connection" - Hexagon Ensemble. Etcetera Records KTC1246, released 2001 - includes Sergei Vasilenko: Quartet on Turkmenian Themes Op.65

== See also ==
See: List of music students by teacher: T to Z#Sergei Vasilenko.
