= Frederick Grinke =

Canadian-born violinist (1911 - 1987)

- Born: 8 August 1911; Winnipeg, Manitoba, Canada
- Died: 16 March 1987 (aged 75); Ipswich, UK
- Occupation: violinist

Frederick Grinke CBE (8 August 1911 – 16 March 1987) was a Canadian-born violinist who had an international career as soloist, chamber musician, and teacher. He was known especially for his performances of 20th-century English music.

== Training ==
Frederick Grinke started learning to play the violin at the age of 9, and studied with John Waterhouse and others in Winnipeg. He made his first broadcast at the age of about 12, and formed a trio at age 15. In 1927, he won a Dominion of Canada scholarship award to the Royal Academy of Music in London, where he studied with Rowsby Woof. He continued his studies (at age 21) for a summer with Adolf Busch in Switzerland, and afterwards in Belgium and London with Carl Flesch.

== Career ==
Hamilton Harty considered appointing him leader of the London Symphony Orchestra at the age of 21, but the offer was not made on account of his youth. From around 1930 to 1936, Grinke was second violin of the Kutcher String Quartet (in which John Barbirolli was for a time the 'cellist). In 1935, with pianist, Dorothy Manley, he gave the premiere of the Canadian composer Hector Gratton's Quatrieme danse canadienne. It was with Manley and Florence Hooton, both fellow students at the Academy, that Grinke formed his trio, Kendall Taylor later replacing Manley.

=== Boyd Neel Orchestra ===
In 1937 he became concertmaster of the Boyd Neel Orchestra. His first performance with them was Salzburg Festival in 1937, giving the premiere of Variations on a Theme of Frank Bridge By Benjamin Britten. He began teaching as Professor at the Royal Academy in 1939. Included among his pupils, were many who went on to become leading British artists (including Sydney Humphreys (of the Aeolian Quartet), Clarence Myerscough and Rosemary Rapaport) and Daphne Godson, who founded the Scottish Baroque Ensemble.

In 1940, he volunteered for the Royal Air Force, joining its Royal Air Force Symphony Orchestra, and toured with them worldwide, notably in the United States. On one occasion, he was flown back to England for a performance of the Arnold Bax concerto (with which he was particularly associated) at the Royal Albert Hall. He also performed before Winston Churchill, Joseph Stalin and Harry S. Truman at the Potsdam Three-Power Conference. In 1945, he was elected a Fellow of the Royal Academy of Music.

=== Post-war: concerts and recordings ===
He remained concertmaster for the Boyd Neel Orchestra until 1947, performing in Europe, USA, Australia and New Zealand (In 1947), and at the London Proms, Salzburg and the Edinburgh Festival. He resigned from it to pursue his solo career.

During the later 1940s, Grinke made numerous recordings, mainly for Decca, many of which were originally released in the last years of 78 rpm records. His recordings of John Ireland's chamber music include the Phantasie Trio of 1908, the 1938 Trio no 3 in E major, and The Holy Boy (with Florence Hooton (cello) and Kendall Taylor (piano)), and the Violin Sonata no 1 of 1909 with the composer at the piano. The trio also recorded the Phantasy trio of Frank Bridge and the Beethoven trio in E flat.

Ralph Vaughan Williams dedicated his Sonata in A minor, written in 1952, to Grinke, who recorded the composer's Concerto Accademico in D minor, and The Lark Ascending, with the Boyd Neel Orchestra. Grinke and David Martin (also a Canadian violinist) performed J.S. Bach's Concerto for two violins at Vaughan Williams's funeral. He made a broadcast of the Arnold Bax concerto from Australia.

Among other recordings from the 1940s were nos 3 and 9 from the 1697 set of 10 Sonatas by Henry Purcell, with Jean Pougnet and Boris Ord, and that composer's sonata in G minor with Arnold Goldsbrough. He is heard with Kendall Taylor in the Dvořák G major Sonatina op 100, and with Watson Forbes (violist of the Stratton Quartet and Aeolian Quartet) in Mozart duos. He also premiered and recorded works by Arthur Benjamin, Benjamin Dale, Lennox Berkeley, Kenneth Leighton, Edmund Rubbra, York Bowen, Howard Ferguson, Arthur Bliss, Béla Bartók, Beethoven, Handel, Rachmaninoff and Smetana, often accompanied by Ivor Newton. He recorded a complete Brandenburg Concertos with the Boyd Neel. (Note: A detailed discography of Grinke is found in Discopaedia of the Violin Creighton.)

=== Later teaching ===
Despite his work in Britain Grinke maintained connections with Canada through the 1960s. From 1963 to 1966 he taught at the Yehudi Menuhin School at Stoke D'Abernon, Surrey. He frequently sat on juries for international competitions. He retired from the Royal Academy of Music in 1978, where his students included John Georgiadis, and was appointed a CBE in 1979, but continued teaching until his death, which occurred in 1987. The National Portrait Gallery lists 8 portraits of Grinke in its collections.

Grinke played an instrument by J. B. Rogerius of 1686, with aluminium-covered D and A, and silver-covered G and steel E strings, but also often played a Stradivarius dated 1718, lent by the Royal Academy of Music. He was married in 1942 to Dorothy Sirr Sheldon and had one son. He is buried in the churchyard of St Mary, Thornham Parva, Suffolk.
