= Aeolian Quartet =

String quartet based in London

A brief article in the Taunton [Somerset] Courier and Western Advertiser of 20th September 1947 is headed 'String Quartet's Concert to World Architects'. This was the Aeolian Quartet playing at the Bridgwater Arts Centre to mark the sixth meeting (the first in the UK and the first since 1937) of the Congres Internationale d'Architecture Moderne, or CIAM. The conference had been organised by Mr C. Van Eesteren, chief town planning officer of Amsterdam.

[link to Wikipedia page on CIAM]

The Aeolian Quartet was a string quartet based in London, England, with a long international touring history and presence, an important recording and broadcasting profile. It was the successor of the pre-World War II Stratton Quartet. The quartet adopted its new name in 1944 and disbanded in 1981.

== Personnel ==
The Aeolian Quartet from 1944 to 1981 (disbanded)

- 1944–1947: Max Salpeter (1st violin); Colin Sauer (2nd violin); Watson Forbes (viola); John Moore (cello)
- 1948–1952: Alfred Cave / Leonard Dight / Watson Forbes / John Moore (to 1957)
- 1953–1964: Sydney Humphreys / Trevor Williams / Watson Forbes / Derek Simpson (from 1957)
- 1965–1970: Sydney Humphreys / Raymond Keenlyside / Margaret Major / Derek Simpson
- 1970–1981: Emanuel Hurwitz / Raymond Keenlyside / Margaret Major / Derek Simpson

A number of other personnel took inner parts for brief periods e.g. Robert Cooper (2nd violin in February 1962). All dates collected from BBC genome project.

== Origins and activities ==
The Stratton Quartet flourished in the 1920s and 1930s. George Stratton, the leader, found it increasingly difficult to lead the London Symphony Orchestra as well as the Stratton Quartet, and so the Aeolian came into being.

The Stratton Quartet performed under that name at the National Gallery frequently during the war. In 1944 the new name was adopted. Both Watson Forbes and John Moore, the violist and cellist, had been members of the Stratton Quartet. Max Salpeter (1908-2010) was previously in the Kutcher String Quartet and was leader of the original New London Orchestra.

The quartet participated in the May 1946 International Music Festival in Prague and the International Contemporary Music Festival in London, July 1946.

The Aeolian Quartet played at the Bridgwater Arts Centre to mark the sixth meeting (the first in the UK and the first since 1937) of the Congres Internationale d'Architecture Moderne, or CIAM. The conference had been organised by Mr C. Van Eesteren, chief town planning officer of Amsterdam. [ref. a brief article in the Taunton [Somerset] Courier and Western Advertiser of 20th September 1947 headed 'String Quartet's Concert to World Architects'.] The Arts Centre had been opened the previous year, in two Georgian houses, not a modern movement building.

From 1948 to 1952 the Aeolian Quartet leader was Alfred Cave, when they made recordings of Peter Warlock's The Curlew with Léon Goossens and tenor René Soames and Purcell Fantasias which they recorded with future member Emanuel Hurwitz.

It was, however, under the leadership of Sydney Humphreys that the 1950s formation of the ensemble was particularly remembered. Humphreys, a Canadian violinist, studied in Vancouver and Toronto and in Europe trained with Frederick Grinke and George Enescu. He was leader of the Aeolian Quartet from 1952 until 1970. He was eminent both as a concertmaster and as a chamber player, notably in the St Cecilia Trio (1954–1965) and as first violin in the Purcell String Quartet (1979–1987).

Emanuel Hurwitz (leader) won a scholarship to the Royal Academy of Music in a contest adjudicated by Bronisław Huberman. In 1937 he was a member of the Scottish National Orchestra under George Szell, and in 1938 joined the London Philharmonic under Thomas Beecham. After the war he formed the Hurwitz string quartet, and led the small orchestra in the Glyndebourne premiere of Britten's The Rape of Lucretia. He was sub-leader of the Boyd Neel orchestra under Maurice Clare, and during the 1950s and 1960s leader of the Melos Ensemble and of the English Chamber Orchestra, which he led to international recognition. In 1965 he won the Worshipful Company of Musicians' Gold Medal for services to chamber music. He was guest leader for two seasons of the New Philharmonia Orchestra working with Carlo Maria Giulini and Otto Klemperer. He became leader of the Aeolian Quartet in 1970.

Raymond Keenlyside (the father of the baritone Simon Keenlyside) was also a leader of the Boyd Neel and English Chamber Orchestras. He studied at the Trinity College of Music, London, and later taught and became a professor there. He was professionally associated with string quartet playing from his college days. Margaret Major studied at the Royal College of Music and won the Lionel Tertis Viola Competition there. She then won the IMA concert award, leading to concerts in London, Paris and Geneva. From 1956 until 1960 she was principal viola for the Netherlands Chamber Orchestra, and then returned as principal viola of the Philomusica of London. She was a noted soloist, and became the third wife of the cellist Derek Simpson. She became professor at the Royal College of Music. Derek Simpson was first holder of the Suggia Scholarship at the Royal Academy of Music, and continued his studies in Paris. Returning to England he won the Queen's Prize and the Moulton-Meyer Award and soon afterwards made his debut in London recital. He was professor at the Royal Academy of Music.

=== Activities ===
Between 1966 and 1973 the Quartet toured Canada, the United States, Mexico and Australia. By 1973 they had completed 33 concerts in Central and South America and the Caribbean, including a performance of Haydn quartets at the Teatro Colón in Buenos Aires. Their schedule also included Amsterdam and Brussels, and the Far East. In 1973–74 they were making tours of Spain, the Middle East and Belgium, with other recitals in Italy and Portugal. There were important appearances at the Edinburgh Festival in 1970 and 1972. In 1977 they planned to tour Australia and New Zealand with Kenneth Essex (viola), with whom they recorded Mozart's viola quintets. They held an international summer school in northern Italy, and established a similar course for chamber music players at the 1976 York Festival.

During the early 1970s they maintained a busy schedule in the UK, including appearances at universities for concerts or master classes. They were awarded honorary degrees at the University of Newcastle-upon-Tyne in 1970, and were also connected with the University of Reading and the University of East Anglia. They gave regular broadcasts on the BBC. From 1973 to 1976 they were engaged on a recording project for Argo Records (UK) (a limb of Decca), to record the complete Haydn quartets using a new edition by H. C. Robbins Landon. This was the first fully complete recording.

The Quartet broke new ground with a televised performance of all Beethoven's late quartets for the BBC Two television channel, broadcast on five consecutive nights in March 1975, and afterwards repeated in other countries. They also recorded the theme-tune for the well-known BBC comedy Fawlty Towers, first broadcast in 1975.

== Recordings ==
The Quartet in its earlier manifestation, with Humphreys, Keenlyside, Forbes and Simpson, sometimes appears on vinyl under a 'Revolution Records' label (a form of the Delta Records label, made and distributed by RCA, not to be confused with the 1996 label of that name), as for instance in a recording of the Elgar piano quintet with Leonard Cassini, Revolution LP RCB.8. Since the Aeolian Quartet's predecessor, the Stratton Quartet, had made the 1933 recording of the Elgar quintet, this Aeolian version (through the continuity in the group of Watson Forbes) has the authority of a tradition going back to the composer. A pre-1953 recording of Mozart's String Quartet No. 21, K. 575, and No. 23, K. 590, has been released on Allegro ALG 3036 and Allegro/Royale 1516, naming Alfred Cave, Leonard Dight, Watson Forbes and John Moore.

The Quartet made many recordings, but is especially noted for the complete Haydn cycle. This included the dubious Op. 3 series, and an account of The Seven Last Words of Christ with poetic readings by Peter Pears (the Hurwitz–Keenlyside–Major–Simpson version, replacing a well-known Humphreys–Keenlyside–Forbes–Simpson version of the same work). In the Schubert C major quintet, D. 956 (c.1966), their collaborator is cellist Bruno Schrecker. In recordings of the quartet (composed 1951–52) and clarinet quintet (1968) by Robert Simpson, the clarinettist is Bernard Walton.

In 1949, the quartet (with Cave as leader) recorded Nikolai Medtner's piano quintet, with the composer at the piano. This was the first recording of the work, made as part of a projected cycle of Medtner performing his own works, funded by his friend and admirer, the Maharaja of Mysore.

== See also ==
- List of string quartet ensembles

== Sources ==
- "The Aeolian String Quartet", in Haydn String Quartets, Argo LPs, vol. 9 (HDNL 49-51) insert, p. 6.
- R. Barret-Ayres, "The String Quartets of Joseph Haydn: Opus 3 & Seven Last Words from the Cross" (Decca, Argo division, London 1977). (Argo Haydn, vol. 11, HDNV 82-84 insert).
