= David Carl Taylor =

South African violinist

David Carl Taylor (16 November 1909 – 25 November 1941) was a South African violinist who performed with the Stratton Quartet in the 1930s. A graduate and later professor of the Royal Academy of Music in London, he remained active in chamber music until his death while serving in the Royal Air Force during the Second World War.

== Early life and education ==
Taylor was born in Johannesburg in 1910. His musical ability earned him an overseas scholarship to the Royal Academy of Music in London, where he subsequently joined the teaching staff. During this period, he became increasingly involved in chamber performance and developed a growing presence in London's musical community.

== Career ==
In 1933, Taylor joined the Stratton Quartet, led by violinist George Stratton. Throughout the decade, the group appeared frequently in British concert programmes and broadcasts and became known for its contribution to the country's chamber-music scene. Taylor remained a member of the quartet until 1941.

== Military service and death ==
During the Second World War, Taylor served as a pilot officer in the Royal Air Force. In November 1941, he flew as the observer on a Bristol Blenheim that took off from RAF Horsham St Faith for a daytime training exercise. The aircraft crashed shortly after takeoff. Taylor was taken to hospital but died the following day from injuries sustained in the accident.
