= Alfred Zamara =

Austrian composer and harpist

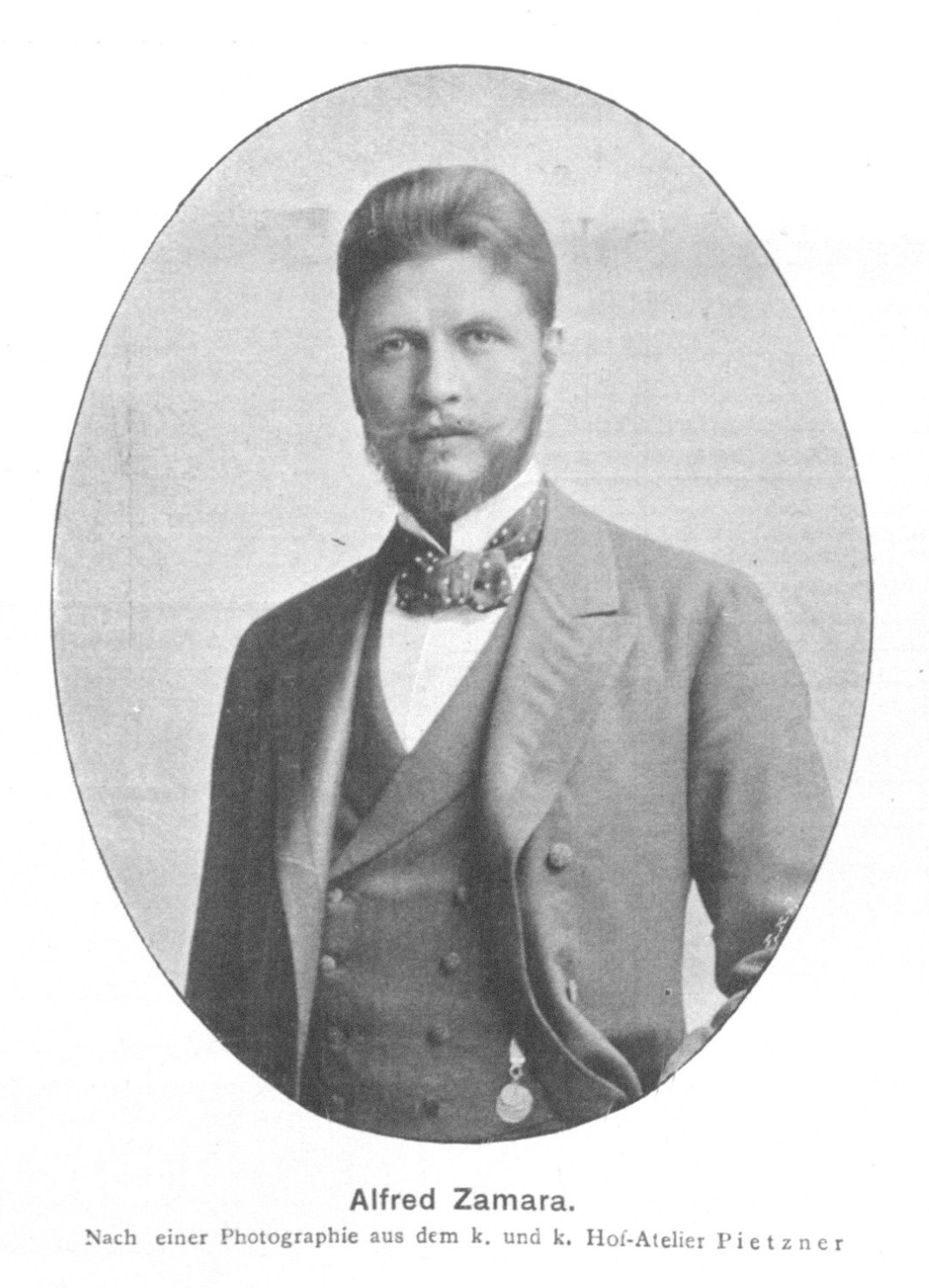
Alfred Zamara, 1901

Alfred Zamara (28 April 1863 – 11 August 1940) was an Austrian composer and harpist.

He was the son of Antonio Zamara (1823 or 1829 or 1831 or 1835 –1901) and was born in Vienna. Like his father, became professor of harp at the Vienna Conservatory and solo harpist at the Vienna Hofoper. He and his sister, Theresa, were both taught the harp by their father. Alfred Zamara wrote many salon pieces, made transcriptions for the harp, and edited François Joseph Naderman's Sieben Etuden; among his pupils was Joseph E. Schuëcker (1886–1938) from 1900 to 1901. ( Antonio Zamara had taught Joseph's father and uncle, Edmund Schuëcker (1860–1911) from 1871 to 1877 and Heinrich Schuëcker (1867–1913) from 1878 to 1884) The Zamaras were a Viennese family of harpists active in the musical life of Croatia in the 19th century. His father, Antonio Zamara, had been born in Italy but the family moved to Austria. His sister, Theresa, was a member of the Budapest Opera and later taught harp at the Vienna Conservatory. He collaborated with Viktor Léon to produce the opera Der Doppelgänger which was produced at the Theater am Gärtnerplatz in Munich in September 1886.
