= Abram Chasins =

American musician (1903–1987)

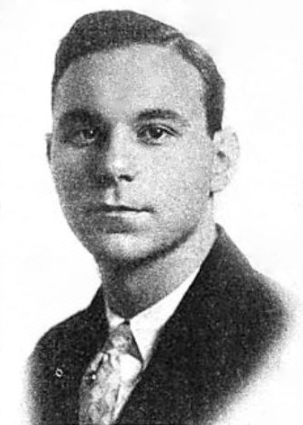
- Born: August 17, 1903; New York, New York, US
- Died: June 21, 1987 (aged 83); New York, New York, US
- Education: Columbia University; Juilliard School; Curtis Institute of Music
- Occupations: Composer, pianist, teacher, broadcaster, writer
- Spouse: Constance Keene (m. 1949)

Abram Chasins (August 17, 1903 – June 21, 1987) was an American composer, pianist, piano teacher, lecturer, musicologist, music broadcaster, radio executive and author.

== Biography ==
Born in Manhattan, New York, he attended the Ethical Culture schools and undertook additional studies through the Columbia University Extension School. He studied piano with Ernest Hutcheson and Bertha Tapper, and composition with Rubin Goldmark at the Juilliard School of Music before proceeding to the Curtis Institute of Music in Philadelphia where he undertook further piano studies with Józef Hofmann. In 1931 he studied music analysis with Sir Donald Tovey in London.

Chasins' career as a pianist lasted from 1927 until 1947. He gave many solo recitals and performed with major orchestras in the United States, Canada, South America and Europe. On January 1, 1929, he made his debut playing his Piano Concerto No 1 with the Philadelphia Orchestra conducted by Ossip Gabrilowitsch. He also gave the premiere performance of his Second Piano Concerto in March 1933, again with the Philadelphia Orchestra, this time conducted by Leopold Stokowski.

From 1926 to 1935 Chasins taught piano as a member of the faculty of the Curtis Institute. He was associated with the radio station WQXR from 1941 to 1965, becoming the music director in 1946. His own radio series, Piano Pointers, ran from 1932 to 1939 and he used his E flat minor Prelude as the program's theme.

In 1949 he married Constance Keene, a pianist and former student of his, with whom he performed and recorded piano duos. In 1972 he joined the University of Southern California as musician-in-residence, and reorganized the student-run radio station KUSC into a channel for classical and modern music. He retired in 1977, and died of cancer at his home in Manhattan on June 21, 1987.

Chasins wrote over 100 compositions, mostly for the piano. His Three Chinese Pieces (1920s) were performed by celebrated pianists including Ignace Hilsberg, Józef Hofmann, William Kapell, Josef Lhévinne and Shura Cherkassky, and in its orchestrated version was the first American work to be performed by Arturo Toscanini with the New York Philharmonic. The "Concert Paraphrase on Strauss's 'Artist's Life'" is among his best works for two pianos, four hands, and his 24 Preludes for Piano (1928) continue to be used as teaching pieces.

He also wrote a number of books on music and musicians, including Speaking of Pianists (1958), The Van Cliburn Legend (1959), The Appreciation of Music (1966), Music at the Crossroads (1972) and Stoki, the Incredible Apollo (1978), a biography of Leopold Stokowski.

== Bibliography ==
- Anderson, E. Ruth. Contemporary American composers. A Biographical Dictionary, 2nd edition, G. K. Hall, 1982.
- Baker's Biographical Dictionary of Musicians (5th ed.).
- Cummings, David M.; McIntire, Dennis K. (Ed.). International who's who in music and musician's directory. In the classical and light classical fields, 12th edition 1990/91, International Who's Who in Music 1991.
- Kehler, George. The Piano in Concert, Scarecrow Press, 1982.
- Kroeger, Karl. Chasins, Abram, in Sadie, Stanley. (Ed.) The New Grove Dictionary of Music and Musicians, Vol. 4, first edition, Macmillan Publishers Limited, 1980.
- Lyman, Darryl. Great Jews in Music, J. D. Publishers, 1986, p. 259f.
- Press, Jaques Cattell (Ed.). Who's who in American Music. Classical, first edition. R. R. Bowker, New York 1983.
- Wilson, Lyle G. A dictionary of pianists, Robert Hale, 1985.
