= Ignace Hilsberg =

Polish pianist (1894-1973)

Ignace Hilsberg (8 July 1894 – 6 July 1973) was a Polish concert pianist who settled in the United States. He was born in Warsaw into a musical family. His brothers included the concert manager, later New York banker Leon Hilsberg (1887–1957), and the violinist and conductor Alexander Hilsberg (1897–1961).

Hilsberg first appeared as soloist with the Warsaw Philharmonic Orchestra at the age of nine, performing Beethoven's Second Piano Concerto. A year later won a scholarship at the Petrograd Conservatory where he studied with Anna Yesipova and then Isabelle Vengerova, graduating in 1917. On his graduation he was summoned to play before the Imperial family.

Following a year teaching at Tomsk in Siberia, Hilsberg embarked on a tour of the Orient, where he was invited to play before the President in the Palace at Peking, and was awarded the medal of Chevalier of the Chinese Republic. There were further lessons in Vienna with Emil von Sauer, who helped him find a teaching position at the (Athens Conservatoire) in 1921, where he stayed for two years.

In 1923 Hilsberg settled in the USA. He performed as a soloist with the New York Philharmonic Orchestra, the Boston Symphony Orchestra, the Los Angeles Philharmonic and the Buffalo Symphony Orchestra. From 1926 until 1936 he was on the faculty of the Juilliard School in New York. In later life he became associated with music for Hollywood films: he is the pianist heard on the soundtrack to Hangover Square (1945), music by Bernard Herrmann. He died in July 1973, aged 78.

== Recordings ==
- in 1928, Abram Chasins (Prelude in D Major Op. 10 No. 5 and 'Rush Hour in Hong Kong') and Scriabin (Etude Op. 2, No. 1).
- in 1930, Robert Schumann ('Aufschwung' from Fantasiestücke, Op. 12 No. 2) and Paderewski (Cracovienne Fantastique).
