= Eugene O'Brien (composer) =

American composer (b.1945)

Eugene O'Brien (born April 24, 1945) is an American composer who has been a member of the faculty at the Indiana University Jacobs School of Music since 1987. He was chair of the Composition Department from 1994 to 1999, and is currently executive associate dean. He has been a member of the composition faculties at Cleveland Institute of Music in Cleveland, and Catholic University of America in Washington, D.C.

== Early life and education ==
O’Brien was born in Paterson, New Jersey. He attended the University of Nebraska, where he received his undergraduate and graduate degree and undertook post-graduate studies at the Staatliche Hochschule für Musik in Köln, Germany as a Fulbright Scholar, and received his Doctor of Musical Arts degree from Cleveland Institute of Music / Case Western Reserve University. He studied composition with Robert Beadell, John Eaton, Donald Erb, Iannis Xenakis, and Bernd Alois Zimmermann,

== Career ==
O'Brien's music has been heard in concerts by the Cleveland Orchestra, the Italian Radio (RAI) Orchestras of Rome and Turin, the Omaha Symphony, as part of the Saint Louis Symphony Discovery series, the Louisville Orchestra New Dimensions series, and in numerous other concerts and festivals throughout this country and abroad. Recorded on the cri, Golden Crest, Crystal, Capstone and Indiana University labels, his works are published by Codex Nuovo, G. Schirmer, and Boosey & Hawkes.

Also active in the performance of new music, composer Eugene O’Brien co-founded the Cleveland new music ensemble Reconnaissance with Donald Erb in 1978 and was associated with the group as its director until 1984.

From 1985 to 1987, he served on the production board of the Contemporary Music Forum in Washington, D.C., and directed the Indiana University New Music Ensemble from 1991 to 1993.

O’Brien received several reviews about his work, including "Embarking for Cythera", "Clouds of Magellan", "Mysteries of the Horizon", "Tristan's Lament", "In the Country of Last Things", "Close Harmony", "Allures".

== Recognition ==
Eugene O'Brien is the recipient of the Academy Award in Music of the American Academy of Arts and Letters, in 1971 the Rome Prize of the American Academy in Rome (Elegy for Bernd alois Zimmermann, soprano and chamber ensemble), composer Eugene O’Brien has received awards from BMI (1967, 1970), ASCAP, and the League of Composers / International Society for Contemporary Music, and Cleveland Arts Prize. He has received Guggenheim, Rockefeller, Fulbright, National Endowment for the Arts and other fellowships, and has been commissioned by the Fromm Foundation at Harvard University, the Serge Koussevitzky Foundation in the Library of Congress, by the Meet-the-Composer / Lila Wallace Reader's Digest Fund, and by various American and European performers and ensembles.
