= Gerda von Bülow =

Danish violinist and music educator (1904 - 1990)

Gerda Carola Frederikke von Bülow, often known as Gerda Bülow, (1904–1990) was a Danish violinist and music educator. In 1963, she founded the Institut for Nordisk Rytmik (Institute for Nordic Rhythm) which she ran until 1989.

== Biography ==
Bülow was born on 23 September 1904 in the Frederiksberg district of Copenhagen, the daughter of the German officer and aristocrat Friedrich August Heinrich von Bülow and his wife Fred Hedvig Christiane Damm. Although she was in fact born a baroness she was not interested in riding or dance, preferring furniture design and the violin. After her father's death in 1916, her Danish mother returned to Denmark with Bülow and her three sisters. She began to play the violin, studying under Gerhard Rafn (1891–1941), whom she married in 1923, and Emil Telmányi. She continued her studies abroad with Firmin Touche in Paris, Georg Kulenkampff in Berlin and Max Rostal and Carl Flesch in London.

She debuted in 1929 at the Tivoli Concert Hall with Max Bruch's Violin Concerto, which was positively received. But as life as a concert pianist became too demanding for her, she turned to education, graduating as a music teacher in 1932 and qualifying in ear training under Dagmar Borup the following year. From the early 1940s, she was an active member of the Danish Music Teachers Association and initiated a long-lasting series of Scandinavian music teaching conferences in 1946. She also developed rhythmic musical education in Denmark after studying the method in Hanover in 1957. In 1961, she founded Nordisk Rytmik (Nordic Rhythm) which she ran from her home in Lyngby. It later received official support, receiving the name Instituttet for Rytmik (The Institute for Rhythm)). Bülow also gave courses in the rhythmic approach throughout Scandinavia, receiving support from her second husband, the music teacher Verner Oluf Mogensen, whom she married in 1945. From 1952 to 1957 she chaired the Danish Ear Training Association and chaired the Rhythmic Educational Organization (RMO) from 1970 to 1978.

Gerda von Bülow's awards included culture prizes from Copenhagen County in 1969 and 1980 as well as award for music education in 1983. She died in Lyngby on 4 May 1990. Her son, Gert von Bülow, is a concert cellist.

== Selected publications ==
- Bülow, Gerda von (1972). Hvad er rytmik? En introduktion i rytmiakmusikalsk opdragelse (in Danish). Wilhelm Hansens Musikforlag.
- —— (1938). Kan vi bruge Jazz som Undervisningsmusik (in Danish). Dansk Musiktidskrift 13. p. 185.
- —— (1946). Moderne Violinteknik og dens systematiske Opbygning (in Danish). Skandinavisk Musikforlag.
