= Johann Jeremias du Grain =

German composer

Johann Jeremias du Grain, also Dugrain, Legrain or Dügren (c. 1700 – 14 January 1756) was a German composer of the Baroque period.

== Life ==
Johann Jeremias du Grain was born in Gdańsk sometime around 1700, probably a descendant of French Huguenots. He studied music in Hamburg with Georg Philipp Telemann, and was named as a vocal soloist in Telemann's large cantata performance on the occasion of the 200-year anniversary celebration of the Augsburg Confession. After graduation, he moved to Elbląg where he married a citizen of that city in 1731, and also worked from 1732. It has been suggested that du Grain met George Frideric Handel, who in 1737 contributed several choruses and arias to a cantata celebrating Elbląg's 500th anniversary, although there is no evidence that Handel actually visited the city. The cantata, which also featured music by du Grain, has been lost. From 1737 to 1739, du Grain was employed as a Kantor at the Marienkirche in Elbląg.

In 1739, du Grain settled in Gdańsk and acquired the position of organist in the then Calvinist St. Elizabeth church. In 1740, he founded a series of public concerts in which he directed an ensemble of instrumentalists, choir, and vocal soloists, and he also made several appearances as a harpsichord soloist. The first such performance took place on 23 February at Grobla III street in which du Grain performed his Dramma per Musica Der Winter, which is now lost. This is the first known public concert ever to take place in Gdańsk. As well as his own compositions, du Grain also regularly performed works by Telemann and Handel.

He collapsed and died on 14 January 1756 during his own concert at Dom Angielski (English House) in Gdańsk.

Du Grain's surviving works include a small number of sacred cantatas and three concertos for harpsichord and strings. It is likely that most of his output has been lost, or is yet to be discovered.
