= I Nyoman Windha =

Indonesian composer

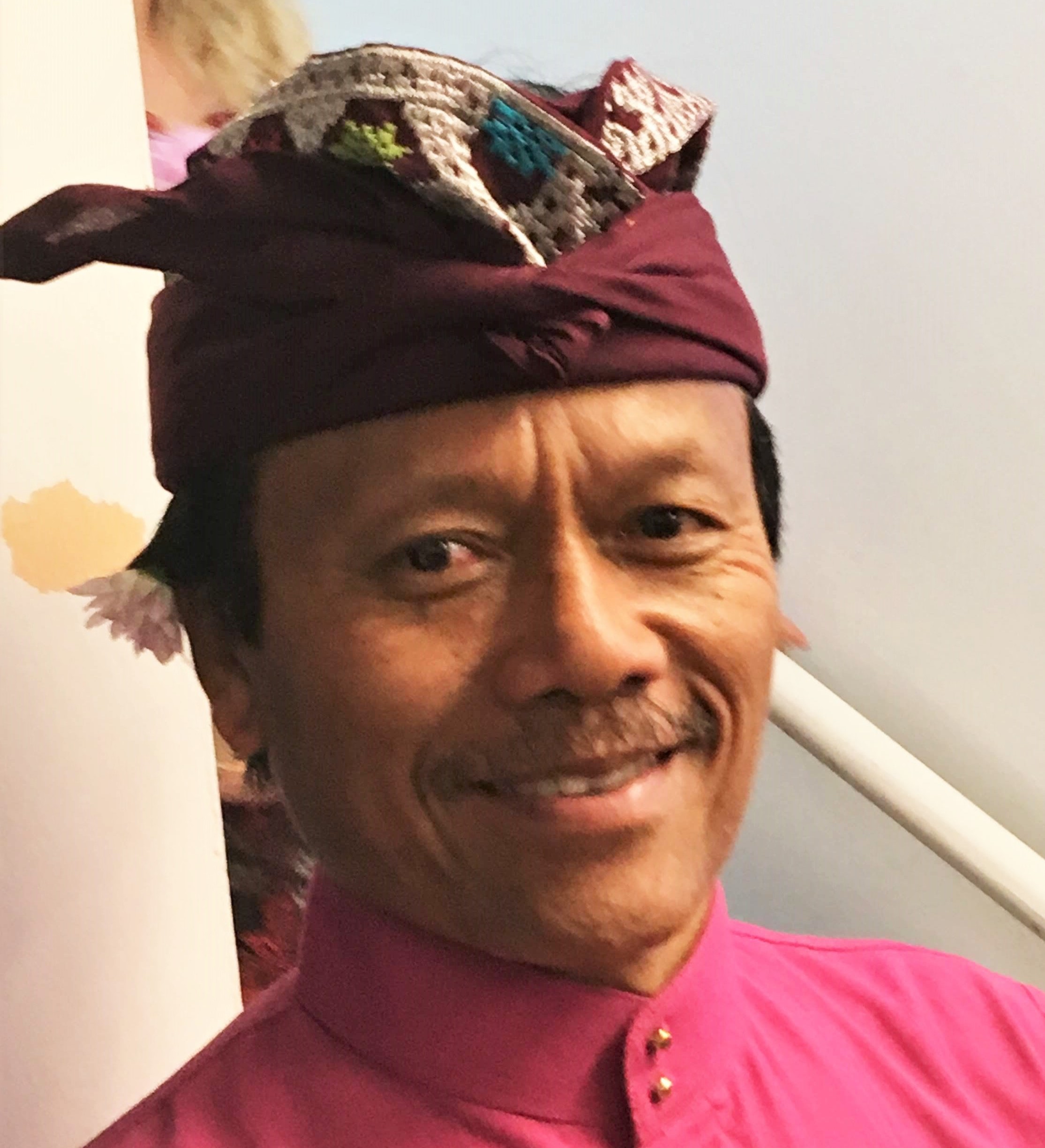
Nyoman Windha wearing traditional dress (pakaian adat)

I Nyoman Windha is one of the leading musicians and contemporary composers of Balinese gamelan music. He was born at Banjar Kutri, Singapadu, Gianyar, Bali. Windha graduated from the National Institute of Arts (ISI) in Denpasar, Bali, receiving a degree equivalent to an M.A. in Music Performance and Composition. Since that time, Windha has been a member of the faculty in music and composition from 1985 until 2020, and has also served as an adjunct for the National Taiwan University Graduate Institute of Musicology since 2018. He has composed dozens of compositions for Balinese gamelan in many genres but primarily in kebyar style. His compositions, such as Puspanjali (1989), have been incorporated into the standard repertoire of Balinese performing groups and many have won awards at Bali's annual gamelan competition.

Windha's music is known for his beautiful melodies, incorporation of forms and styles from Javanese gamelan, and other innovations such as use of 3/4 time. He has traveled and taught extensively around the world. See: List of music students by teacher: T to Z#I Nyoman Windha.
