= William Waterhouse (violinist) =

Canadian violinist and music educator

William James Waterhouse (15 August 1917 – 22 November 2003) was a Canadian violinist and music educator. At the age of 4, he began studying the violin with his father, John Waterhouse, and music theory with the composer and conductor Bernard Naylor. While a teenager he entered the Royal Academy of Music (RAM) in London where he was a pupil of Michael Head and Rowsby Woof. He earned a L.A.B. diploma from the RAM in 1933 and was later awarded an honorary doctorate from the school in 1976. He remained in London throughout the 1930s, playing as a member of the Boyd Neel Orchestra (1936-1939), the London String Orchestra (1936-1939), the Silverman Quartet (1935-1938), and the Stornoway Players (1937-1939).

In 1939 Waterhouse returned to Canada, notably appearing as a soloist with the Montreal Symphony Orchestra during several concerts in the 1939–1940 season. In the early 1940s he was heard as a soloist with several orchestras in Canada and the United States, including performing Johannes Brahms's Double Concerto in partnership with Martin Hoherman with both the Boston Pops Orchestra and the CBC Winnipeg Orchestra. In 1946 he began pursuing further studies at Boston University where he graduated with both a Bachelor of Music and a Master of Music in 1950. From 1951 to 1975 he was a member of the Boston Symphony Orchestra and from 1975 until his retirement in 1987 he was principal second violin of the Boston Pops Orchestra. He concurrently played in the Winnipeg Symphony Orchestra from 1975 to 1987 and was also actively performing in duo concerts with the pianist Leonard Isaacs during those years.
