= Miron Polyakin =

Russian violinist and pedagogue (1895 - 1941)

- Genres: classical music
- Occupation: violinist
- Instrument: violin

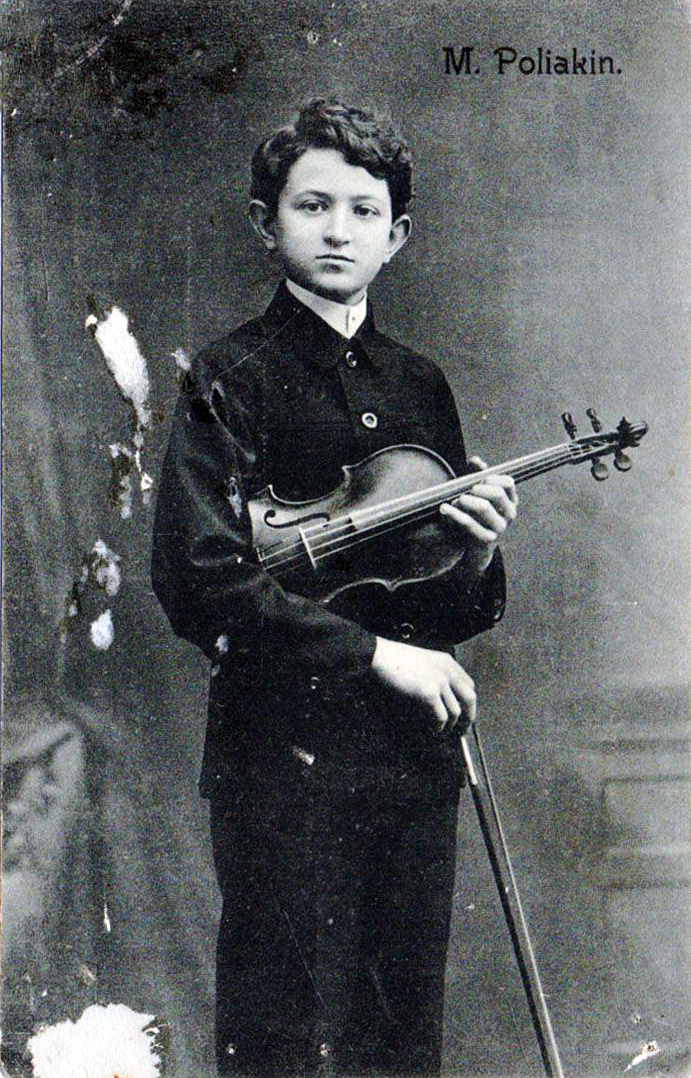
Miron Polyakin on a pre-revolutionary postcard.

Miron Borisovich Polyakin (Russian: Мирон Борисович Полякин; (February 12, 1895 in Cherkasy - May 21, 1941 in Moscow) was a Russian and Soviet violinist and pedagogue, one of the best known disciples of the famous Leopold Auer. Between 1917-1926 he toured many countries of the world, and in 1922 gave his New York debut. Upon his return to the Soviet Union, he undertook the professorship position at the Leningrad Conservatory (1928–1936) and then the Moscow Conservatory (1936–1941).
