= Diane Thome =

American composer (born 1942)

- Born: January 25, 1942; Pearl River, New York
- Died: January 12, 2025 (aged 82); Seattle, WA
- Education: Eastman School of Music; University of Pennsylvania; Princeton University
- Occupation: Composer

Diane Thome (January 25, 1942 - January 12, 2025) was an American composer. She studied piano with Dorothy Taubman and Orazio Frugoni and composition with Robert Strassburg, Roy Harris, Darius Milhaud, A.U. Boscovich, and Milton Babbitt.

== Life and work ==
Thome graduated with two undergraduate degrees from Eastman School of Music with distinction in piano and composition, a Master of Arts in theory and composition from the University of Pennsylvania and a Master of Fine Arts and Ph.D in composition from Princeton University. She was the first woman to receive a Ph.D. in music from Princeton University.

After completing her studies, Thome became a professor and then chair of the Composition Program at the University of Washington School of Music. Thome's compositions have been performed in Europe, China, Australia, Canada, Israel and the United States. She has been composer-in-residence at the University of Sussex and the Chamber Music Conference and Composers' Forum of the East (Bennington, Vermont). Her compositions have been featured on French radio.

Thome has received commissions from organizations including the Bremerton Symphony Association, Seattle Symphony, New Jersey Symphony Orchestra, The Eleusis Consortium, The Esoterics, and Trimpin.

== Honors and awards ==
- 1994 Washington Composer of the Year
- 1995-1996 Solomon Katz Distinguished Professor in the Humanities
- 1998 International Computer Music Conference Commission

== Works ==
Thome has composed for solo instruments, chamber and choral ensembles, orchestra, and electronic media. Selected works include:

- Pianismus for solo piano
- Unseen Buds (1996)
- Bright Air/Brilliant Fire (1997)
- UnfoldEntwine (1998)
- Like A Seated Swan (1999)

Her works have been recorded and issued on CD including

- Bright Air/Brilliant Fire Audio CD (2001), Centaur, ASIN:B00005Q479
- Palaces of Memory Audio CD (1995), Centaur
- Composers in the Computer Age (1993), Centaur, ASIN: B0000057VJ
- America Sings Audio CD (1998) Leonarda Productions, Inc.
- Sunbursts (1992) Capstone, Society of Composers, Inc.
