= Christopher Wilson (composer) =

British composer and conductor

Christopher Wilson (7 October 1874 - 17 February 1919) was a British composer and conductor best known for his theatre music.

Wilson was born in Melbourne, Derbyshire, into a musical family. His mother and grandmother were both accomplished pianists, and his uncle, Francis William Davenport, was a professor at the Royal Academy of Music. He showed early musical promise as a composer and performer (piano, organ, violin, viola). In 1889 he won the first choral scholarship at Derby School. In 1892 he became a student at the Royal Academy of Music under Alexander Mackenzie, where he was awarded the Mendelssohn Scholarship in 1895.

There followed a period of study abroad, with Franz Wüllner in Cologne, Heinrich von Herzogenberg in Berlin and Charles-Marie Widor in Paris. His Suite for String Orchestra was first performed while he was in Cologne, (the first such performance of English music at a principal concert there since Arthur Sullivan) and published by the German publishers Schott in 1899. It shows the influence of the Grieg and Tchaikovsky suites for string orchestra, and perhaps of Parry in "mock baroque" mode, whose Lady Radnor's Suite was first performed in London in 1894. A modern recording of Wilson's work was issued in 2021.

His working life was mostly as a composer and musical director for the theatre. His scores included incidental music to F. R. Benson's production of the Orestean Trilogy (1904), Rudolf Besier's The Virgin Goddess (1906), Oscar Asche and Edward Knoblock's Kismet (1911), Josephine Preston Peabody's The Piper (1911), and music for many Shakespeare plays as produced by Asche, Benson, Otho Stuart and Ellen Terry. One of the most notable of these was The Taming of the Shrew, co-produced by Asche and Stuart at the Adelphi Theatre in 1904. During this period Wilson was living at 30, Bedford Street in London, off the Strand.

Other works outside the theatre include a second suite for strings, two string quartets, a piano quartet, two violin sonatas, a setting of Robert Browning's Prospice, and a choral mass. He also composed the music for the Winchester National Pageant, held at Wolvesey Castle in 1908.

Wilson died of heart failure at the age of 44 in 1919. His book Shakespeare and Music, compiled from a series of articles he had written for The Stage in the year before his death, was published posthumously in 1922.
