= Colin Sauer =

British violinist (1924–2015)

Colin Sauer (13 July 1924 – 9 January 2015 ) was a violinist and chamber musician who was one of the founding members of the Aeolian Quartet in 1944. He later lead the Dartington String Quartet for over 20 years. He played with the Hallé Orchestra under John Barbirolli and the BBC Symphony Orchestra under Adrian Boult. Colin also conducted the Devon Fellowship of Music Youth Orchestra where he inspired many generations of young musicians.
