= Stratton Quartet =

British string quartet

The Stratton String Quartet was a British musical ensemble active during the 1930s and 1940s. They were specially associated with the performance of British music, of which they gave numerous premieres, and were a prominent feature in the wartime calendar of concerts at the National Gallery. After the War the group was re-founded as the Aeolian Quartet.

== Personnel ==
- George Stratton, violin
- William Manuel, violin
- David Carl Taylor, violin
- Lawrence Leonard, (violist), viola
- Frank Howard (musician), viola
- Watson Douglas Buchanan Forbes (1909–1997), viola
- John Moore (cellist), cello

== Origins ==
The quartet was named after its leader George Stratton, who was also leader of the London Symphony Orchestra. Stratton formed the quartet in 1926. The original personnel were George Stratton, William Manuel, Lawrence Leonard and John Moore.

George Stratton was born in 1897 in Southgate, Middlesex, and studied at the Guildhall School of Music in London. He became principal second violin in the Queen’s Hall Orchestra in 1923. He was appointed leader of the London Symphony Orchestra in 1935, in succession to Billy Reed, and held the post until his retirement in 1953, when he was awarded an MBE. In 1953 he was selected by Sir Adrian Boult to co-lead the orchestra for the Coronation of Elizabeth II. He was a Professor of Violin at the Royal College of Music from 1942. He died in 1954, just as he was beginning to make his name as a conductor.

Watson Forbes studied at the Royal Academy of Music under Editha Knocker and Raymond Jeremy, and played in the Academy quartet as second violin: but, opportunities arising to take on the viola desk he made the transition and viola became his primary instrument. He studied in Písek, Czechoslovakia with Otakar Ševčík, and in England received lessons from Albert Sammons. Around 1930 he joined the Stratton Quartet and remained with it through the 1930s.

Records of the Arts and Humanities Council (UK) show that the Stratton performed at the Grotrian Hall in London in June 1928, and (with the pianist Harriet Cohen) in Berlin in February 1929. In October 1930, at the Conway Hall (Red Lion Square), they took part in a series of 10 free concerts with the Guild of Singers and Players. Probably also around 1930, they performed the Quartet op 44 of the Suffolk composer Stanley Wilson. In February 1932 they are found at Brighton with Joseph Szigeti, and a month later assisted Benjamin Britten by providing a private run-through of his Quartet in D major. They performed at Londonderry House (London) for the British Music Society in January 1933.

In 1933 they made their famous recording of the Edward Elgar piano quintet with Harriet Cohen. This was recorded as a present for the composer who was then in his last illness. Albert Sammons and Raymond Jeremy, both of whom had taught Watson Forbes, had taken part in the work's original performance of 1919.

In 1934 and 1935 the Quartet championed the work of Mary Lucas, performing her quartets at the First Performance Society (presented by London Musical Club), in November 1934, and in January 1935 at the Blackheath Music Society. In March 1935 with Raymond Jeremy they gave the first performance of the Arnold Bax String Quintet in one movement. Their championing of British music continued in the first performance of the Three Divertimenti of Benjamin Britten, at the Wigmore Hall in February 1936, a performance which was met with sniggers and cold silence, undermining the confidence of the composer.

During the later 1930s George Stratton found his many duties including orchestral work increasingly onerous. In 1939 he was leading the Haigh Marshall orchestra, and the London Theatre Concerts were being given at the Cambridge Theatre. In 1939 the quartet visited Poland, sponsored by the Internal Society for Contemporary Music. They were accompanied by Sir Arthur Bliss and Elisabeth Lutyens whose quartets they performed.

The Strattons gave the world premiere of the Lennox Berkeley String Quartet No.2, Op.15, at the Cambridge Theatre in June 1941.

The Stratton Quartet was very closely associated with the concerts given at the National Gallery in London during the Second World War, organized by Myra Hess and Howard Ferguson. Their first was in October 1939, and they performed there about once monthly. Performances included the Gerald Finzi Oboe interlude, with Edward Selwyn (January 1940), a Beethoven concert in early February, Stratton and Moore in a piano trio with Betty Humby (Lady Beecham) (February 1940), a Sibelius concert (March 1940), Stratton, Forbes and Moore with Reginald Paul, as the 'Paul Pianoforte Quartet' (March 1940), an Elgar quintet with Eileen Joyce (May 1940), a recital with Benno Moiseiwitsch and a Mozart recital with oboist Joy Boughton (July 1940), and a quartet recital in August 1940. These performances continued through the war, for example a recital with Myra Hess in January 1941, and with Harriet Cohen and Marie Korchinska (harp) in November 1943.

Carl Taylor who played with the quartet from 1933, died in the war in 1941. David Carl Taylor was born in Johannesburg in 1910. He won an overseas scholarship to study at the Royal Academy of Music, London, later becoming a professor there. As a pilot officer in the war, Carl was the observer on a Bristol Blenheim which departed RAF Horsham St Faith on a daylight training exercise in November 1941. The aircraft crashed on takeoff and Carl died the next day from his injuries. After Taylor's death, his place was taken by Edwin Virgo. George Stratton and Edwin Virgo stepped down in 1943 and Max Salpeter and Colin Sauer took over as 1st and 2nd violin. The quartet then changed its name to the Aeolian Quartet and gave its first performance under this name in May 1944, when it performed at the memorial programme for Ethel Smyth along with the BBC Symphony Orchestra and Sir Adrian Boult.

After the war, in 1946, the Aeolian Quartet performed in Austria, northern Italy and Czechoslovakia, appearing at the first International Music Festival in Prague. Both Watson Forbes and John Moore remained members of the new group for several years thereafter.

== See also ==
- Aeolian Quartet

== Sources ==
- Concert programme archives (see external links)
- Margaret Campbell, 'Obituary: Watson Forbes', The Independent, 5 July 1997.
- Christopher Fifield, Ibbs and Tillett: the Rise and Fall of a Musical Empire (Ashgate Publishing, 2005).
