= Piano pedagogy =

Study of teaching piano playing

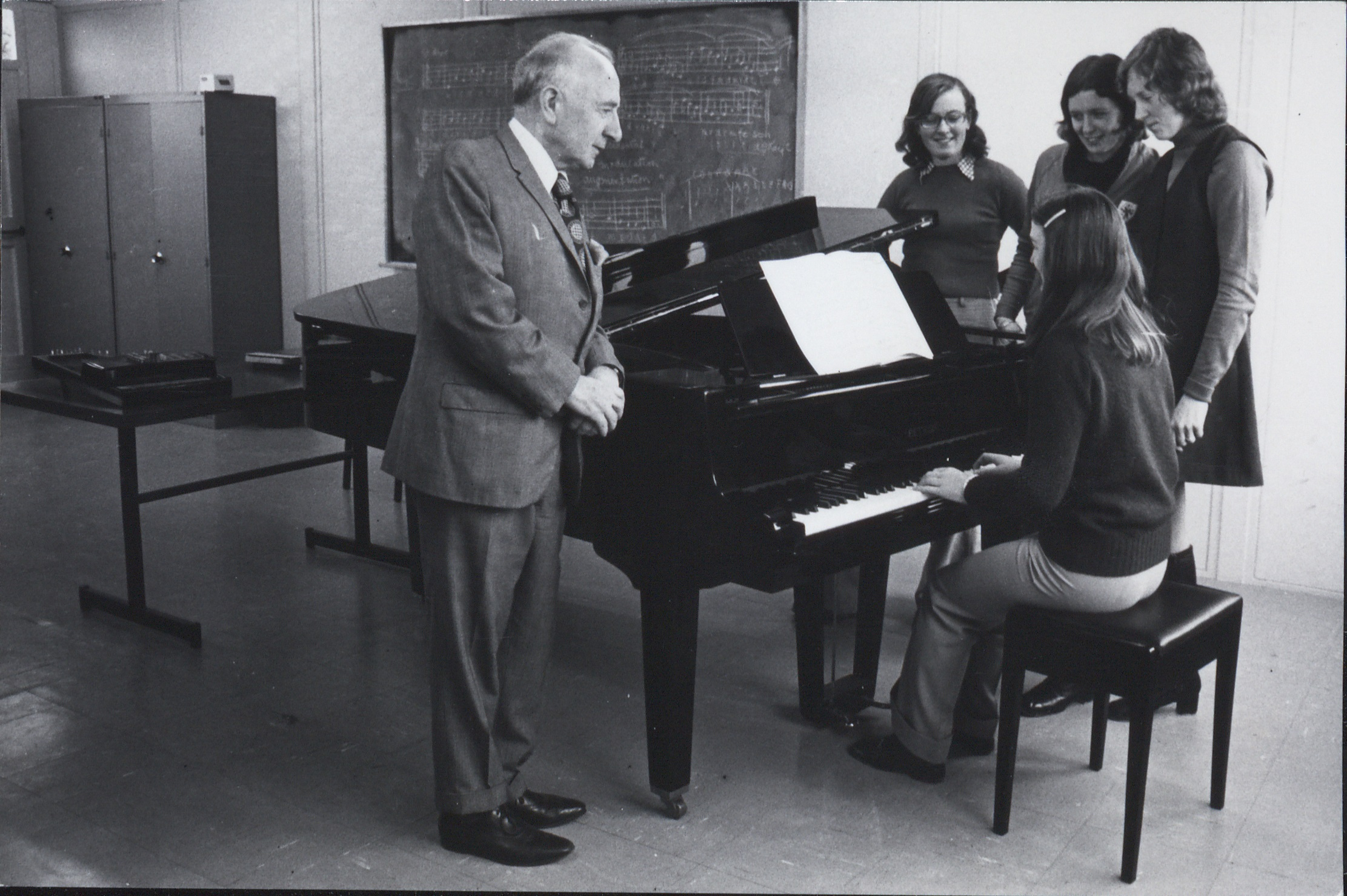
Music education at NCPE, depicting a piano teacher with a student playing the piano and three fellow students observing

Piano pedagogy is the study of the teaching of piano playing. Whereas the professional field of music education pertains to the teaching of music in school classrooms or group settings, piano pedagogy focuses on the teaching of musical skills to individual piano students. This is often done via private or semiprivate instruction, commonly referred to as piano lessons. The practitioners of piano pedagogy are called piano pedagogues, or simply, piano teachers.

== Professional training ==
The range of professionalism among teachers of piano is wide. "Competent instruction is not always assured by the number of years one has taken lessons", warned piano pedagogue and writer of numerous pedagogical books, James Bastien. The factors which affect the professional quality of a piano teacher include one's competence in musical performance, knowledge of musical genres, music history and theory, piano repertoire, experience in teaching, ability to adapt one's teaching method to students of different personalities and learning styles, and education level.

=== Musicians without degrees in piano pedagogy ===
In the United States, piano lessons may be offered by teachers without higher education specifically focused in piano performance or piano pedagogy. Some teachers may hold degrees in another discipline in music, such as music education or another performance area (voice, orchestral instrument, etc.). Other teachers, without higher education in music, may have studied piano playing independently or have been self-taught.

=== Undergraduate and graduate studies in piano pedagogy ===
The field of piano pedagogy may be studied through academic programs culminating in the attainment of a bachelor, master, or doctoral degree at music colleges or conservatories. The undergraduate level may require many years of prior piano studies and previous teaching experience as prerequisites for application. At the graduate level, many schools require applicants to have some teaching experience and at least a bachelor of music or equivalent experience in piano performance and/or pedagogy.

Although virtually all piano pedagogy programs include a significant portion of performance requirement, the pedagogy major may be distinct from the performance major at some schools. Some performance majors may have the option to take courses in the teaching of piano, but not all do.

=== Professional organizations in the United States ===
Many piano teachers hold memberships in professional organizations, to maintain their commitment to pedagogy and to network with peers and others in music. These organizations often offer teachers' workshops, conferences, mentorship programs, publications on piano pedagogy, and opportunities for scholarships, competitions, and performances for the students of members. Some prominent organizations in the United States include:

- American Council of Piano Performers – ACPP
- Music Teachers National Association – MTNA
- National Federation of Music Clubs
- National Guild of Piano Teachers
- Piano Teachers Congress of New York

=== Professional Organizations in Canada ===
The main organization that offers certificates and testing curriculum in Canada is the Royal Conservatory of Music. There are three levels in its certificate program: elementary, intermediate and advanced. The elementary pedagogy certificate enables teachers to teach beginners up to grade two piano, while the intermediate certificate allows teachers to teach up to grade 6 piano. Advanced piano pedagogy is known as "ARCT" (Associate of Royal Conservatory of Toronto), which enables teachers to teach up to grade 10. Each certificate program is also accompanied by a number of theory and history examinations which must be completed. There is also a Piano Teachers Federation based in Vancouver, British Columbia.

== Notable piano pedagogues in history ==
- Johann Nepomuk Hummel (Austria, 1778–1837)
- Carl Czerny (Austria, 1791–1857)
- Carl Philipp Emanuel Bach (Germany, 1714–1788)
- Maria Szymanowska (Poland, 1789–1831)
- Frédéric Chopin (Poland, 1810–1849)
- Theodor Leschetizky (Poland, 1830–1915)
- Franz Liszt (Hungary, 1811–1886)
- Tobias Matthay (England, 1858–1945)
- Nadia Boulanger (France, 1887–1979)
- Heinrich Neuhaus (Russia, 1888–1964)
- Dimitri Bashkirov (Russia, 1931–2021)
- Neil A. Kjos (US, 1931–2009) Illinois, known for the James Bastien books
- Abby Whiteside (US, 1881–1956)
- Dorothy Taubman (US, 1917–2013)
- Isidor Philipp (France, 1863–1958)
- Harold Bradley (Canada 1906–1984)
- Frances Clark (US, 1905–1998)
- Fanny Waterman (England, 1920–2020)
- Stefan Ammer (Germany, 1942–)
- Ilana Vered (Israel, 1943–)
- Peter Arnold (United Kingdom)
- Graham Fitch (United Kingdom)

== Topics of study ==
Piano pedagogy involves the study and teaching of motor, intellectual, problem-solving, and artistic skills involved in playing the piano effectively. Citing the influence of Zoltán Kodály, Carl Orff and Émile Jaques-Dalcroze, Faina Bryanskaya, a Russian-American piano pedagogue at the Longy School of Music, argues that a holistic approach which integrates as many aspects of music-making as possible at once results in the most effective piano teaching.

=== Ear training ===
Dr. Bryanskaya argues that the foremost task for piano teachers at the beginning of a student's study is the introduction of a habit of listening to quality performances of "descriptive and strikingly expressive music", as a means for "sensitizing [the student] to the meaning of music".

=== Rhythm ===
Teaching rhythm is important for the student to be able to learn a piece accurately, and also to confidently perform a practiced piece. Developing an internal metronome plays a significant role when teaching rhythm. Teachers may encourage students to count out loud when practicing, or practice with a metronome to develop a steady internal beat.

=== Notation ===
Learning to read music is a critical skill for most pianists. There are generally three approaches to teaching students to read music, although combined approaches are increasingly common. The "Middle C Method", a "single note identification" method, was the most commonly taught method through the 20th century. It was introduced by W.S.B. Mathews in 1892 but popularized by Thompson's Modern Course for Piano (1936). "Middle C" teaches positions relative to the middle C; in other "single note identification" methods, other notes might be used.

The "intervocalic method", developed by Frances Clark with her Time to Begin (1955) curriculum, teaches recognition of patterns, and adds "landmark notes".

The "multi-key method", developed by Robert Pace and published in 1954, teaches students all major and minor keys fairly quickly.

=== Technique ===
Good piano playing technique involves the simultaneous understanding in both the mind and the body of the relationships between the elements of music theory, recognition of musical patterns in notation and at the fingertips, the physical landscape of the entire range of the keyboard, finger dexterity and independence, and a wide range of touch and tone production for a variety of emotional expressions. Skills in all of these areas are typically developed so that the pianist can express themselves more effectively and naturally through the sound of the piano, and so that technical elements are played with musicality.

=== Improvisation ===
Modern piano lessons tend to emphasize learning notation, which may come at the expense of developing creativity and aural sensitivity, both of which contribute to expressive music-making. Studies point to the need for using multiple approaches in learning musical skills which engage both sides of the brain—the analytical and the intuitive—for students to master all aspects of playing. Therefore, teaching improvisation skills may help students take ownership of the expressive quality of the music they make, and keep music learning and practicing engaging. One way to do so is to make up stories full of different emotions through improvising, in order to reinforce music theory concepts already introduced and to develop a wide range of touch and tone production.

=== Sight reading ===
Sight reading depends heavily on a student's ability to understand rhythm and recognize musical patterns. Teaching sight reading can include teaching students to recognize intervals, scale passage patterns, note reading and the ability to internalize rhythm. Strong knowledge of the major and minor key signatures can also help students anticipate the accidentals they should expect when sight reading.

=== Memorization ===
Memorization is useful for performing a piece confidently. It allows the student to experience the intricacies of the music rather than focusing on the technicalities of notes and rhythm. Memorization comes more easily to some students than to others. The most common memorization technique is muscle memory. However, reliance on muscle memory alone can hinder students who have not made the cognitive connection between every note they play, and makes memory slips more likely. A strong foundation in memorization involves being able to visualize everything one plays and to start from any passage.

Effective memorization results from the "combination of visual, kinaesthetic, aural and analytical skills".

=== Repertoire ===
Well-known keyboard works written for pedagogical purposes include:

- Notebook for Anna Magdalena Bach (1725) by family and friends of J.S. Bach
- Klavierbüchlein für Wilhelm Friedemann Bach, Little Preludes and Fugues, Inventions and Sinfonias, & the Well-Tempered Clavier by J.S. Bach
- Sonatinas by Muzio Clementi
- Album For the Young, Op. 68 (1848) by Robert Schumann
- Album For the Young, Op. 39 (1878) by Pyotr Ilyich Tchaikovsky
- Music for Children, Op. 65 (1935) by Sergei Prokofiev
- Pieces by Igor Stravinsky, Dmitri Kabalevsky and Aram Khatchaturian
- Mikrokosmos, Sz. 107, BB 105 (1926–39) by Béla Bartók

== Venues offering instruction in piano playing ==
The teaching of piano playing most often takes place in the form of weekly private lessons, in which a student and a teacher have one-on-one meetings. Instruction may sometimes be offered semi-privately (one teacher meeting with a small group of two or more students) or in classes of larger groups, in other intervals of time. Piano lessons are offered in a variety of settings, including the following:

- Studios of independent piano teachers
- Piano and music stores
- Community music schools
- Continuing education programs
- Preparatory division of music colleges or conservatories
- Music colleges or conservatories
- Online Distance-learning Courses
- In-home/mobile music schools that travel to student's homes

== See also ==
- Five finger exercise
- Pedagogy
- Pianists
- Group piano
