= Danae Kara =

Greek pianist and educator

- Δανάη Καρά
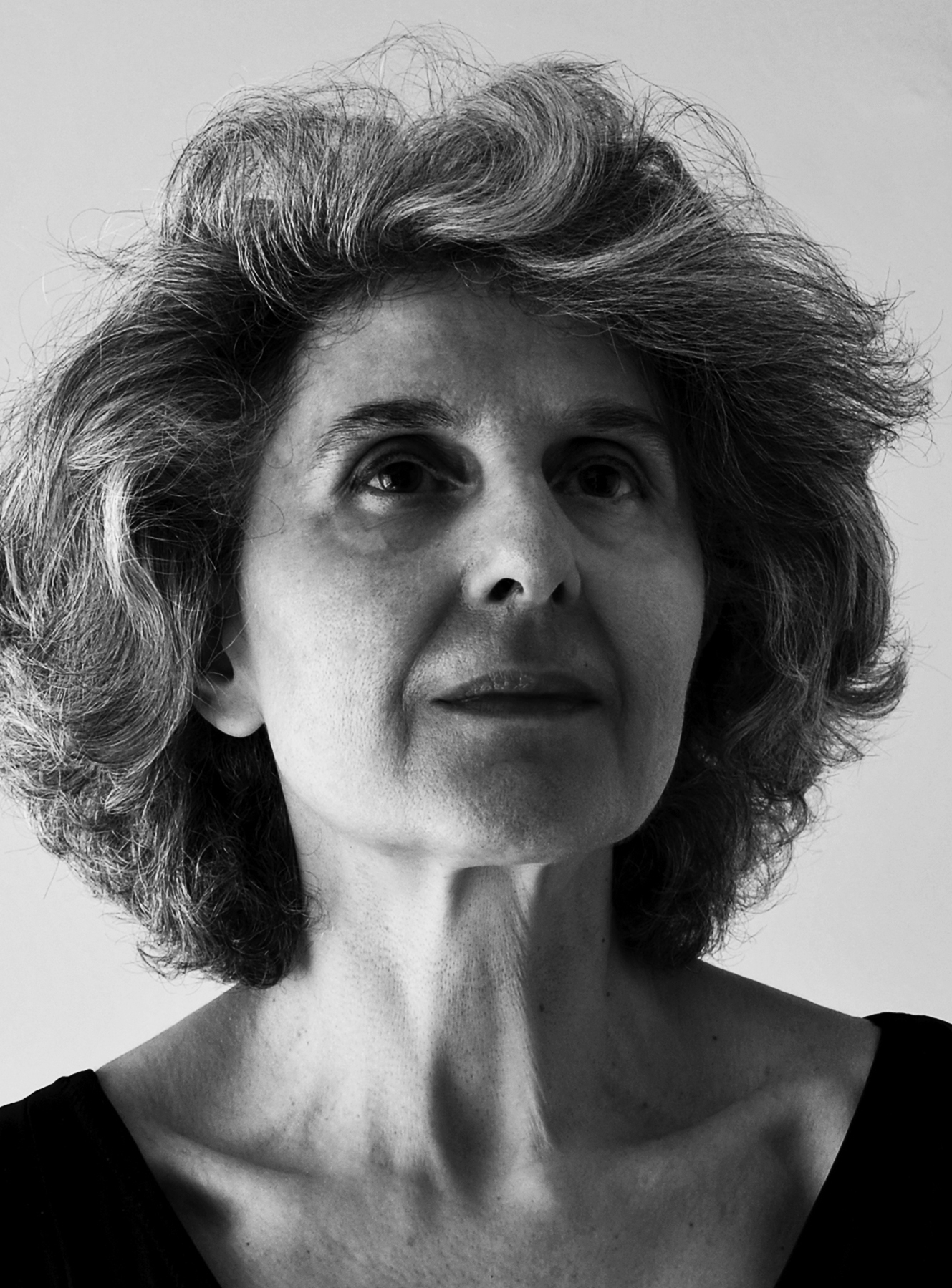
- Portrait of Danae Kara (2014)
- Born: 27 July 1953 (age 73); Istanbul, Turkey
- Education: Istanbul Municipal Conservatory; Athens Conservatoire; Juilliard School
- Alma mater: Juilliard School
- Known for: Piano concerts
- Style: Classical music
- Awards: Recording Award; 2000 The Union of Greek Theater & Music Critics; Hellenic Music Award; 2003 National Council of Music/member of UNESCO

Danae Kara (Greek: Δανάη Καρά; born on 27 July 1953) is a Greek classical concert pianist, recording artist, and educator, best known for her interpretations of 20th century Greek modernist composers.

== Early life ==
Greek pianist Danae Kara is a superb advocate in these first-recorded performances.

— Mark Lehman, The Absolute Sound

Danae Kara was born on 27 July 1953 in Istanbul, Turkey. She began music lessons at the age of five, in 1958, at the Istanbul Municipal Conservatory with Ferdi Statzer (né Friedrich von Statzer, pupil of Emil von Sauer and Friedrich Wührer). Having immigrated to Greece in 1966, she continued at the Athens Conservatory with the pianist Maria Cherogeorge-Sigara (Greek: Μαρία Χαιρογιώργου-Σιγάρα, pupil of Alfredo Casella and Marguerite Long) and composer Konstantinos Kydoniatis (Greek: Κωνσταντίνος Κυδωνιάτης) for theory, earning both her "Piano Soloist’s Diploma" and "Advanced Theory Diploma" with the distinction of "First Prize" and "Gold Medal of Iph. & A. Syggrou" in 1972.

As a scholarship student, she graduated from the Juilliard School of Music (New York City) in 1978, New York with the Bachelor's and Master's Degrees in Music (1978). It was at Juilliard where her artistic identity was honed by her principal teacher, Jacob Lateiner, and by composer David Diamond as well. In addition to receiving the Isabelle Vengerova legacy from Lateiner, she has been coached by Ivan Moravec, and Nina Svetlanova, student of Heinrich Neuhaus.

== Music career ==
Since her recital debut at the age of sixteen (1969) in Athens, Greece, she has given performances worldwide in major venues in European cities, in Latin America, throughout Russia and the former Soviet Republics.

Kara has toured extensively during the years 1979 to 2009 performing as a soloist and recitalist in festivals and concert halls with numerous orchestras such as the Aarhus Symphony Orchestra, the Athens State Orchestra, the BBC Philharmonic, the Bangkok Symphony, the Budapest Camerata, the Cervantino Festival Orchestra, the Hellenic Radio Symphony Orchestra, the London Festival Orchestra, the Lithuanian State Symphony Orchestra, the Orchestre national de Montpellier Languedoc-Roussillon, the Moscow Virtuosi, the Sofia Philharmonic, the Salzburg-Mozarteum Orchestra, the Vienna Chamber Orchestra, among many others.

Among the conductors with whom she has collaborated were Giancarlo Andretta, Matthias Bamert, Hans Graf, John Georgiadis, Philippe Entremont, Miltiadis Karydis, Jakob Kowalski, Alexander Lazarev, Friedemann Layer, Christian Mandeal, Alexander Myrat, Robertas Servenikas, and Vladimir Spivakov.

She has had live concert broadcasts on both radio and television by the Hellenic Broadcasting Corporation, Radio & Television Baku, Radio Educación, UNAM Radio, Radio France, France Musique, Westdeutscher Rundfunk, WGBH Boston, WQXR-FM, "Glastonbury Radio" and BBC Radio 3.

As a chamber musician she has collaborated with mezzo-soprano Markella Hatziano, bass Christophoros Stamboglis, violinist Hideko Udagawa, and the string quartets "Voces", "Auer" and "Kroger".

As Artist-in-residence, she taught at the American College of Greece from 1987 to 2012.

Her discography with Naxos Records, Universal/Decca Records, Agorá Musica, Philips/PolyGram, Millenium Archives, EMI Classics and Lyra Records was met by the international press with great critical attention and acclaim. More specifically, she won accolades for her unusual premieres of diverse styles such as the recordings of Mendelssohn's "Three Piano Concerti", Sicilianos's "Piano Concerto", Nikos Skalkottas's "Piano Concerti", Cimarosa's "62 Sonatas", Brahms's "Opus 116, Seven Fantasias, for piano", "Op. 117, Three Intermezzi, for piano", Op. 118, Six Pieces, for piano & Op. 119, Four Pieces, for piano, Dimitri Mitropoulos's "Piano Works", Manos Hatzidakis's "Piano Works" and other of her albums. She was the recipient of the "Recording Award 2000", by "The Union of Greek Theater & Music Critics".

For her enduring commitment and determination in giving premières of works outside the standard repertory, such as the monumental "Third Piano Concerto" by Nikos Skalkottas in 2003 in Paris, France, Danae Kara received the "Hellenic Music Award" of the "National Council of Music/member of UNESCO".

== Discography ==
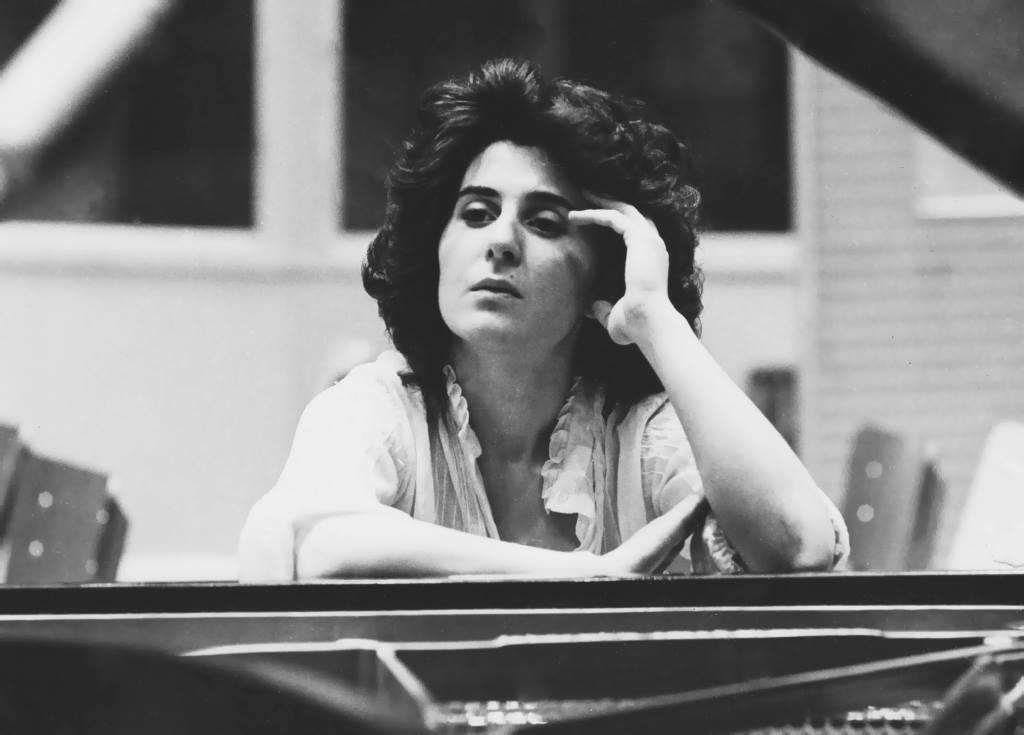
Danae Kara at Columbia Studios in 1982

- Kyriakos Sfetsas "In the stream of the Sun"
  (1982 LP by EMI-Columbia, 1995 CD by Finea Sound)
- Danae Kara "Plays Greek Composers – Kalomiris / Skalkottas / Hadjidakis / Konstantinidis / Theodorakis"
  (1983 LP by Philips/PolyGram, 2000 CD by Universal)
- Danae Kara "Plays Manuel De Falla & Mikis Theodorakis"
  (1985 LP by Philips/PolyGram, 2000 CD by Universal)
- Manolis Kalomiris "Evening Legends"
  (1987 LP by Concert Athens, 1989 CD by Lyra)
- Danae Kara "Piano Gems"
  (1992 CD by Lyra)
- Christoforos Stamboglis & Danae Kara "Compsizioni Da Camera"
  (1996 CD by Lyra)
- Manos Hadjidakis "The Piano Works"
  (1996 CD by Agora Musica, 2008 CD Reissue by Naxos Records)
- Dimitris Mitropoulos "Piano Works & World Première"
  (1997 CD by Agora Musica, 2013 Digital Form Reissue by Naxos Records)
- Domenico Cimarosa "The Piano Sonatas"
  (1997 Double CD by Agora Musica)
- Yorgos Sisilianos "Concerto for piano and Orchestra"
  La Camerata, Orchestra of the Friends of Music, Athens Concert Hall Orchestra in Residence, Alexandros Myrat, cond.
  (1998 CD by Agora Musica)
- Felix Mendelssohn "The Three Piano Concertos"
  La Camerata, Orchestra of the Friends of Music, Athens Concert Hall Orchestra in Residence, Alexandros Myrat, cond.
  (1998 CD by Agora Musica)
- Johannes Brahms "The Last Piano Works – op. 116, 117, 118 & 119"
  (2000 CD by Agora Musica)
- Thanos Mikroutsikos "Dance and Memories, a selection of piano works"
  (2001 CD by Agora Musica)
- Nikos Skalkottas "Piano Concertino in C, Piano Concerto No. 3"
  Orchestre National de Montpellier, Friedemann Layer, cond.
  (2004 CD by Universal/Decca)

== Festivals ==
- International Athens Festival (1994–1999)
- XV International Piano Festival, Universidad Industrial de Santander, Colombia (1999)
- XXIII Festival Internacional Cervantino, Mexico (1995)

== See also ==
- Odeon of Herodes Atticus
- Musikhuset Aarhus

== Literature ==
- Pianist, scholar, "Connoisseur: Essays in Honor of Jacob Lateiner" (Festschrift Series) Publisher: Pendragon Press, ISBN 978-1-5764-7001-5
- Kenji Kondo, "Unknown Eastern European Classical Music", 2011, ISBN 978-4-7872-7306-2
- Musical America Worldwide Directory (1983–1986)
- 2004 Encyclopædia Britannica, Inc, Britannica Book of the year, Encyclopædia Britannica, ISBN 960-8322-07-3
