= John Bloomfield =

John Bloomfield may refer to:

- John Bloomfield costume designer (born 1942)
- John Bloomfield (academic) (1932–2022), Australian academic
- John Bloomfield (British Army officer) (1793–1880), British Army general
- John Bloomfield, 2nd Baron Bloomfield (1802–1879), British peer and diplomat
- John Bloomfield (politician) (1901–1989), Australian politician in the government of Victoria
- John Bloomfield (musician) (fl. 2000s), American musician and educator
- John Bloomfield (sport shooter) (born 1956), English sports shooter
