= John Bloomfield (musician) =

American music teacher

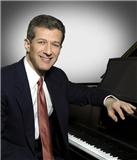

John Bloomfield (born in Winchester, Kentucky), attended Furman University in Greenville, South Carolina, where he graduated magna cum laude. After he earned a master's degree in piano performance from the Manhattan School of Music, Bloomfield worked closely with both Dorothy Taubman and Edna Golandsky for many years.

Bloomfield taught at Adelphi University and at the Manhattan School of Music in the pre-college division. He has also taught at festivals in Lecce, Italy and in Taiwan. He has been a recitalist, clinician, and lecturer at universities in Madison, Cleveland, Honolulu, Philadelphia, Boulder, Portland, and other cities. He is a performance associate at Hunter College and Queens College in New York City. Bloomfield was invited to be the keynote speaker at the 2007 MTA convention in California. His performances have been broadcast in New York City.

From 1992 to 2002 Bloomfield was faculty chairman of the Taubman Institute. In 2003 he co-founded the Golandsky Institute. Bloomfield serves as one of the Institute's senior directors and its faculty chair.

== Sources ==
- www.golandskyinstitute.org
- www.golandskyinstitute.org/princeton
- www.mclellandpiano.homestead.com
- www.musicalartscenter.com
- www.music.ua.edu
- www.pianoaccompanists.com
- www.pianoteachers.com
- www.siouxcitysymphony.org
- www.classicalconnect.com
