= Adam Rafferty (musician) =

American guitarist and composer (born 1969)

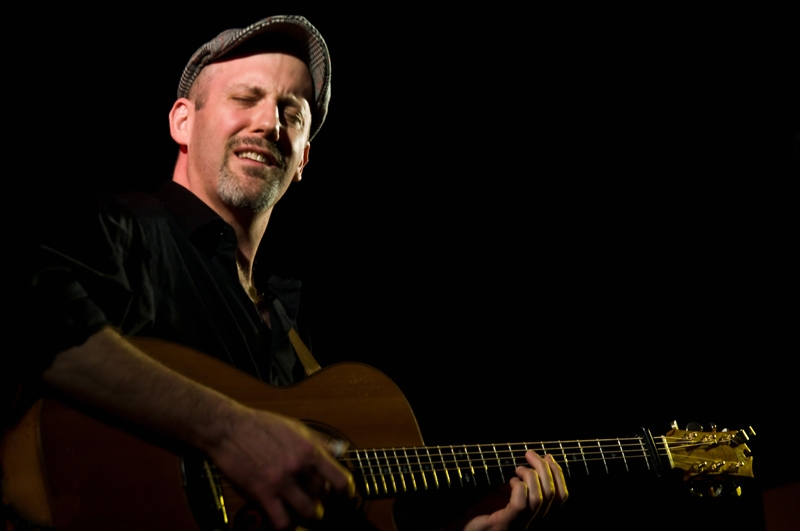
- Adam Rafferty in Wetzlar, Germany, March 21, 2014

Background information
- Born: Adam Rafferty; January 26, 1969 (age 57); New York City
- Origin: New York City
- Genres: Jazz
- Occupations: Musician, composer
- Instrument: Guitar
- Years active: 1986–present
- Label: Crescent Ridge
- Website: adamrafferty.com

Adam Rafferty (born January 26, 1969) is an American guitarist and composer. He is known for his cover versions of pop songs by Stevie Wonder, Michael Jackson, and the Beatles and for the use of beatboxing while playing guitar.

== Career ==
=== Early life ===
Rafferty was born January 26, 1969, and raised in Harlem, New York. His first inspiration was his father strumming a Martin D-28 guitar for him.

By the age of six, he was studying with Woody Mann and exploring blues and country music. He credits Woody Mann with much of his development. A few years later, Rafferty was introduced to classical guitar with formal instruction from Dennis Cinelli and Pat O'Brien.

In 1986, he enrolled at the State University of New York at Purchase, majoring in classical guitar. He continued a fruitful collaboration with childhood friend and drummer, John-Christian Urich. They played together in a variety of contexts from hard rock to R&B. By the time Rafferty finished college, he switched to electric guitar.

=== Rap and jazz ===
By the mid to late 1980s, Rafferty and Urich formed the duo Raf and Cooly C, backed by a live band, with Rafferty rapping and playing guitar and Urich adding drums and beatbox. The duo created a local stir. They were picked to perform on the album, Bring Me Edelweiss by the Austrian band Edelweiss for Atlantic Records. The album went gold in Europe, though Rafferty and Urich never made any money.

In 1989, Rafferty quit Raf and Cooly C and began to explore jazz. After seeing pianist Mike Longo perform at the Birdland club in New York, he took lessons from him. After graduating from college, he played in jam sessions and gigs in New York City. He worked with Bob Cranshaw, Lou Donaldson, Virgil Jones, Gloria Lynn, Frank Wess, Buster Williams, and the Dizzy Gillespie Big Band directed by Jimmy Owens. He also crossed paths with talents from his own generation, such as Eric Person, Norah Jones, and Chris Potter. Drawn to the jazz scene in Harlem, he worked for nearly a year with organist Jimmy "Preacher" Robbins. He also worked with the Tippy Larkin Quintet.

In 1993, he recorded his debut album, First Impressions, with his mentor, Mike Longo, on piano, Paul West on bass, and Ray Mosca on drums. The album received a favorable review in Just Jazz Guitar magazine. Beginning in the mid 1990s, he headed his own trio, often taking them on annual tours of Europe, particularly in Austria and Germany. By the late '90s, he settled on a band featuring Danton Boller and Tomas Fujiwara. The same group appeared on his third album, Three Souls. He formed an experimental jazz trio, the New York Trio Project, with bassist John Menegon and drummer Jeff Siegel. Boller introduced him to tenor saxophonist Bennie Wallace, and tours followed. He met Alvin Queen, who used him as a sideman in his quintet with alto saxophonist Jesse Davis and trumpeter Joe Magnarelli. In 2006, he was asked to substitute on Lonnie Smith's organ trio. They performed at jazz festivals, the Jazz Standard, and Smoke in New York City.

=== Switching to fingerstyle ===
In 2007, a friend showed him a video of fingerstyle guitarist Tommy Emmanuel. Inspired by what he saw, he began to experiment with arranging pop songs, taking an approach that enabled him to play bass lines, melody, and middle voicings simultaneously. He brought to fingerstyle guitar the music he enjoyed as a kid: disco, hip hop, funk, jazz, and R&B. He also used beatboxing, which he learned from Run–D.M.C. records in the 1980s and from his time as a rapper.

His first album as a solo acoustic guitarist, Gratitude, was recorded on his own at his home in Jackson Heights, New York. He began distributing his home performances on YouTube. His cover versions of Michael Jackson's "Billie Jean" and Stevie Wonder's "Superstition" received more than one million views.

At the suggestion of a YouTube fan, Rafferty went to the Chet Atkins Appreciation Society in 2008 to meet like-minded fingerstyle guitarists. He was asked to be appear as a guest at a Tommy Emmanuel concert at B.B. King's club in New York. He performed with Emmanuel at the Bangkok Guitar Festival, in Helsinki, Finland in 2009, and again B.B. King's club in 2010. The association with Emmanuel allowed him to meet and play with other established acoustic musicians, such as Michael Fix and Joe Robinson.

== Other work ==
He performed at Merkin Concert Hall in New York City in 1996 at a tribute concert for guitarist Tal Farlow. Included on the bill were over a dozen jazz guitarists, including Jimmy Bruno, Howard Alden, Jack Wilkins, Johnny Smith, Remo Palmier, John Abercrombie, Herb Ellis, Ron Affif, Al Gafa, Joe Diorio, Mark Elf, Gene Bertoncini, and Vic Juris.

He has written two instructional books, How to Develop Virtuoso Single Line Technique for Jazz Guitar, based on “The Virtuoso Pianist” by C.F. Hanon (2003) and How to Play Single Note Lines that Outline Chord Changes for Jazz Guitar (2003).

== Award and honors ==
In 1998, he was selected for inclusion in the book, The Jazz Guitar: Its Evolution, Player, and Personalities Since 1900 by Maurice J. Summerfield.

His album I Remember Michael was in the top 10 Critics' Poll of Jazziz magazine in 2011.

== Discography ==
=== As leader ===
- First Impressions with Mike Longo, Paul West, Ray Mosca (CAP, 1993)
- Blood Sweat and Bebop with Mike Longo, Bob Cranshaw, Ray Mosca (CAP, 1998)
- Kush with Danton Boller, Russ DiBona (CAP, 2001)
- Three Souls with Danton Boller, Tomas Fujiwara (CAP, 2001)
- Fifth House (Imaginary, 2001)
- The New York Trio Project with John Menegon, Jeff Siegel (2003)
- Gratitude (Crescent Ridge, 2008)
- Chameleon (Crescent Ridge, 2009)
- Girl Meets Guitar (Acoustic Music Records, 2010)
- Play Pretty for the People (Crescent Ridge, 2016)
- A Christmas Guitar Celebration (Crescent Ridge, 2010)
- I Remember Michael (Crescent Ridge, 2011)

=== As sideman ===
With New York State of the Art Jazz Ensemble

- Explosion (2000)
- Aftermath (2001)
- Oasis (2004)
