= Adam Rafferty =

Adam Rafferty may refer to:

- Adam Rafferty (cyclist) (born 2005), Irish cyclist
- Adam Rafferty (musician) (born 1969), American guitarist and composer
