= Robert Durso =

Italian-American pianist (born 1959)

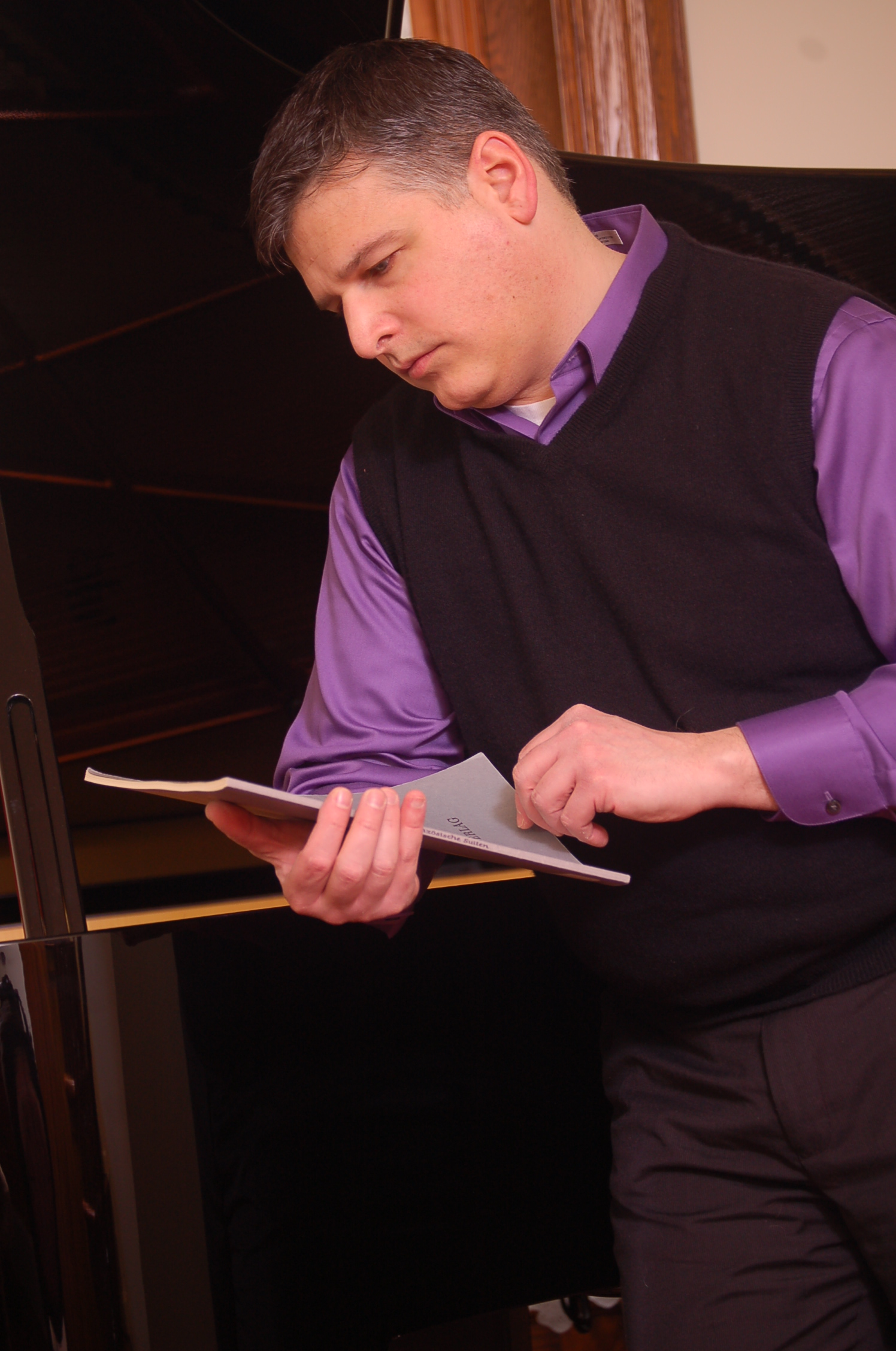

Robert Durso is an Italian-American pianist, born in 1959. Mr. Durso was educated at the Peabody Conservatory, Indiana University Bloomington and Temple University. His principal teachers were Enrica Cavallo-Gulli, Harvey Wedeen, Edna Golandsky, Dorothy Taubman, and Rosalyn Tureck.

== Career ==
Mr. Durso has given concerts, lectured and conducted master classes in Venezuela, Israel, Rome, Vienna, Zurich, Switzerland, Belgium, and England. Robert Durso is a founding member of the Belmonte Trio along with Jennifer K. Lee and Glenn Fischbach.

Mr. Durso is also co-founder and senior director and faculty member of the Golandsky Institute, held annually at Princeton University.

== Sources ==
- www.golandskyinstitute.org
- http://www.pianomap.com
- http://www.robertdurso.net
- http://www.privatelessons.com
- www.castelfranc.com
- www.frederick.edu
- www.effortlessartistry.com
- www.taubman-tapes.com
