= Étienne Ozi =

French musician

Étienne Ozi (9 December 1754 – 5 October 1813) was a French bassoonist and composer. He is known for his concertos, symphonies concertantes, and pedagogical pieces. His works were influential in the development of the bassoon and remain a staple of the classical bassoon repertoire.

Ozi's Nouvelle Méthode de basson (1803) was regarded as one of the first complete instructional materials for the bassoon, which was at the time still seven-keyed, as compared to the far more complex modern instrument. The technical demands of Ozi's literature spurred on its development; instrument maker Carl Almenräder in particular used his compositions to direct further development of the bassoon in his development of the key mechanism. The Méthodes were adopted by the early Paris Conservatory as a course of study, containing "detailed principles for the study of the bassoon, exercises in all keys with bass accompaniment, twelve sonatas of progressive difficulty, thirty scale variations and forty-two caprices. It also includes instructions on caring for the instrument, and methods of making the reeds."

Born in Nîmes, Ozi received his early musical experience from a military ensemble, but settled in Paris in 1777, where he studied with Georg Wenzel Ritter. His 1779 debut at the Concert Spirituel won the effusive praise of the Parisian press. His 36 appearances over 12 years performing there included 19 performances of his own works.

== Works, editions and recordings ==
- Etienne Ozi: Six Grandes Sonates from "Nouvelle Méthode de Basson", Paris 1803 Danny Bond (bassoon), Richte van der Meer (cello). Accent Records.
