= Charles-Louis Hanon =

French piano teacher and composer (1819–1900)

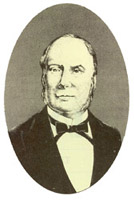
Charles-Louis Hanon

Charles-Louis Hanon (2 July 1819 – 19 March 1900) was a French piano pedagogue and composer. He is best known for his work The Virtuoso Pianist in 60 Exercises, which is still used today for modern piano teaching, but over the years the method has also faced criticisms.

== Biography ==
Charles-Louis Hanon was born in northern France in the village of Renescure on 2 July 1819. Trained as an organist by a local teacher, it is not known if he received more advanced musical education. At age 27, Hanon moved east from Renescure to Boulogne-sur-Mer, where he lived with his brother François, who was also a musician.

Music was never the exclusive focus of Hanon's life: he was also a devout Roman Catholic, a Third Order Franciscan and a member of the Society of St. Vincent de Paul.

It is known from an 1869 article that Hanon was involved with a monastic order called the "Brothers of the Christian Schools". Founded in the 17th century by Saint John Baptist de la Salle, the schools run by the order provide free instruction to poor children. One such school was established in Boulogne-sur-Mer in approximately 1815 by Léon de Chanlaire and Father Benoît-Agathon Haffreingue; free music instruction was offered there by 1830.

Hanon died on 19 March 1900 in Boulogne-sur-Mer, at age 80.

== The Virtuoso Pianist ==
Charles-Louis Hanon's The Virtuoso Pianist has been a primary part of piano pedagogy internationally, particularly within the Russian piano school. Both Sergei Rachmaninoff and Josef Lhévinne attributed the high technical standard of Russian pianism at their time to the systematic practice of these exercises. In Russian conservatories, the Hanon exercises were historically mandatory; students were required to pass rigorous examinations where the exercises were performed from memory, at high speeds, and transposed into all major and minor keys.

Although most respected pedagogues and pianists acknowledge the value of Hanon's exercises, they have their detractors. Some critics have questioned the merits of the independent finger technique which the exercises seek to cultivate, with some pedagogues, such as Abby Whiteside, considering them to be actively harmful.

It has become a custom in some music schools to hold a Hanon Marathon where the exercises are played competitively. The Church Street School for Music and Art was the first to have coined the term and hold the event.

== Other works and derivatives ==
Hanon also wrote 50 instructional pieces, Méthode Élémentaire de Piano, and a collection of 50 Ecclesiastical Chants.

Charles Nunzio wrote Hanon for Accordion, a two-volume set of exercises for piano accordion based on a similar philosophy, which has recently been reissued in an updated edition.

A Hanon for guitar and bass have also been written.

== See also ==
- Five finger exercise

== Sources ==
- Josef Lhévinne - Basic Principles in Pianoforte Playing
- James Francis Cooke - Great pianists on piano playing (chapter - Rachmaninov)
