= Music lesson =

Type of formal instruction in music

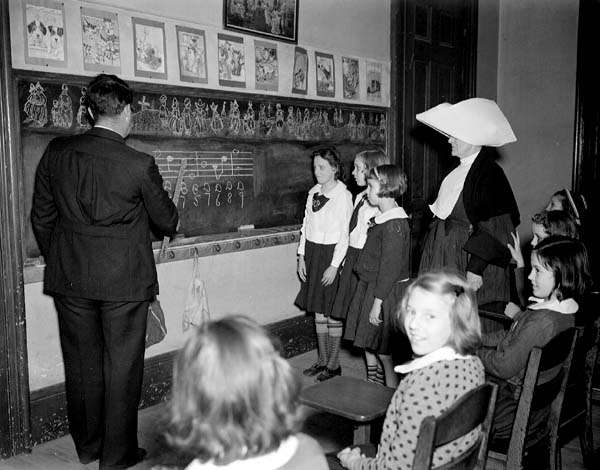
A teacher using a blackboard to illustrate a music lesson in New Orleans, in 1940

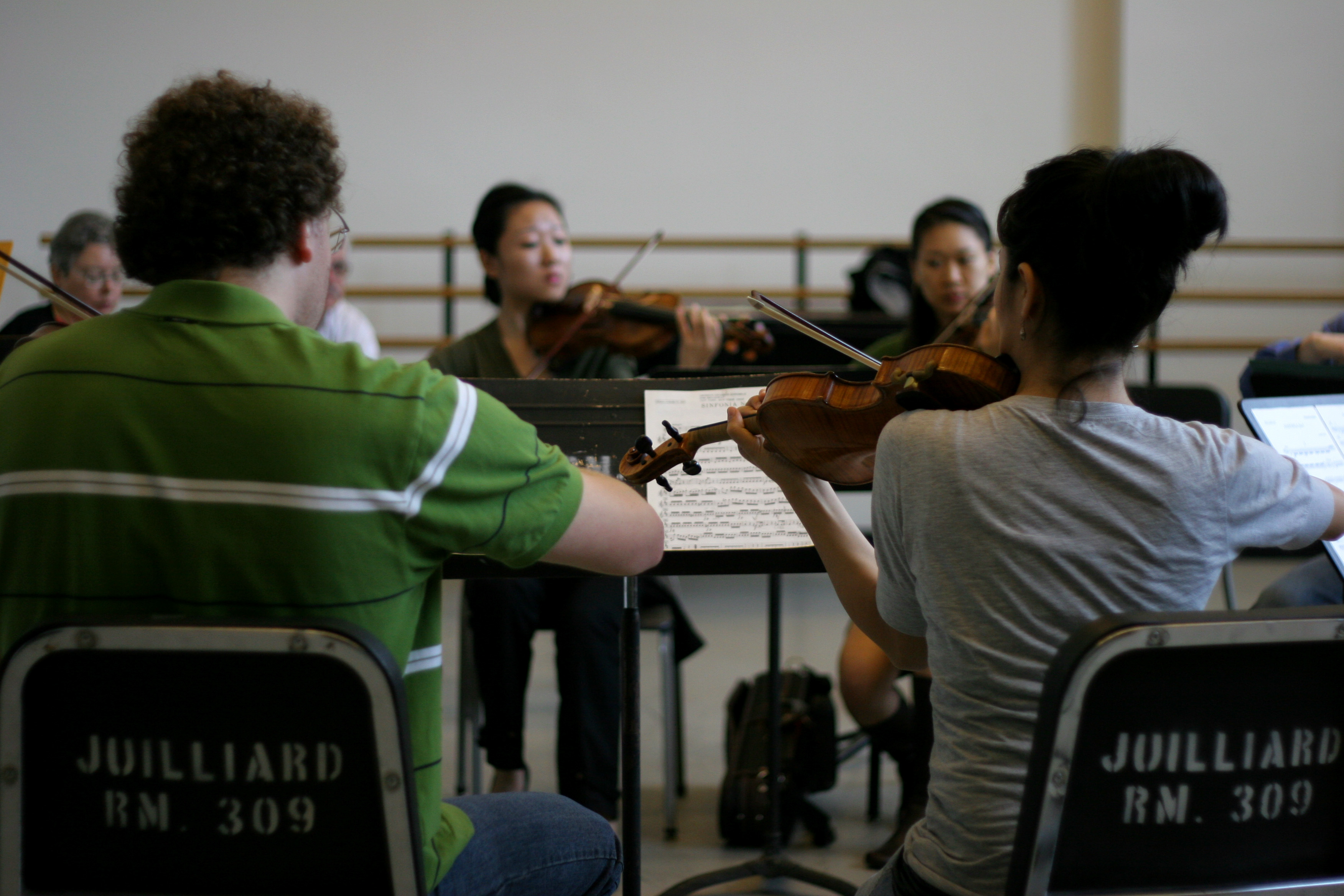
The chamber orchestra of Juilliard School in New York City

Music lessons are a type of formal instruction in playing a musical instrument or singing. Typically, a student taking music lessons meets a music teacher for one-to-one training sessions ranging from 30 minutes to one hour in length over a period of weeks or years. Depending on lessons to be taught, students learn different skills relevant to the instruments used. Music teachers also assign technical exercises, musical pieces, and other activities to help the students improve their musical skills. While most music lessons are one-on-one (private), some teachers also teach groups of two to four students (semi-private lessons), and, for very basic instruction, some instruments are taught in large group lessons, such as piano and acoustic guitar. Since the widespread availability of high speed. low latency Internet, private lessons can also take place through live video chat using webcams, microphones and videotelephony online.

Music lessons are part of both amateur music instruction and professional training. In amateur and recreational music contexts, children and adults take music lessons to improve their singing or instrumental playing skills and learn basic to intermediate techniques. In professional training contexts, such as music conservatories, university music performance programs (e.g., Bachelor of music, Master of music, DMA, etc.), students aiming for a career as professional musicians take a music lesson once a week for an hour or more with a music professor over a period of years to learn advanced playing or singing techniques. Many instrumental performers and singers, including a number of pop music celebrities, have learned music "by ear", especially in folk music styles such as blues and popular styles such as rock music. Nevertheless, even in folk and popular styles, a number of performers have had some type of music lessons, such as meeting with a vocal coach or getting childhood instruction in an instrument such as piano.

== Posture ==
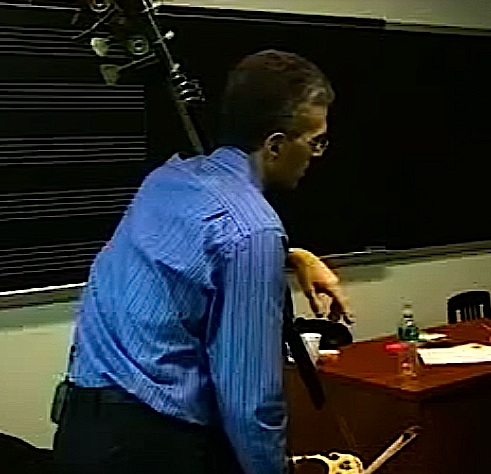
Manhattan School of Music professor Timothy Cobb teaching a bass lesson in the late 2000s

For vocal lessons, teachers show students how to sit or stand and breathe, and how to position the head and mouth for good vocal tone. For instrument lessons, teachers show students how to sit or stand with the instrument, how to hold the instrument, and how to manipulate the fingers and other body parts to produce tones and sounds from the instrument. For wind and brass instruments, the teacher shows the student how to use their lips, tongue, and breath to produce tones and sounds. For some instruments, teachers also train students in the use of the feet, as in the case of piano or other keyboard instruments that have damper or sustain pedals on the piano, the pedal keyboard on a pipe organ, and some drums and cymbals in the drum kit such as the bass drum pedal and the hi-hat cymbal pedal. In addition to teaching fingering, teachers also provide other types of instruction. A classical guitar player learns how to strum and pluck strings; players of wind instruments learn about breath control and embouchure, and singers learn how to make the most of their vocal cords without hurting the throat or vocal cords.

Teachers also instruct students in achieving correct posture for most efficient playing and to prevent injury. For all instruments, the optimal way to move the fingers and arms to achieve a desired effect is to play with the least tension in your hands and body. This prevents habit formation that can injure the skeletal frame and muscles. For example, when playing the piano, fingering—which fingers to put on which keys—is a skill slowly learned as the student advances, and there are many standard techniques a teacher can pass on.

There are many myths and misconceptions among music teachers, especially in the Western classical tradition, about "good" posture and "bad" posture. Students who find that playing their instruments causes them physical pain should bring this to their teachers' attention. It could be a potentially serious health risk, but it is often overlooked when learning to play an instrument. Learning to use one's body in a manner consistent with the way their anatomy is designed to work can mean the difference between a crippling injury and a lifetime of enjoyment. Many music teachers would caution students about taking "no pain, no gain" as an acceptable response from their music teacher regarding a complaint of physical pain. Concerns about use-related injury and the ergonomics of musicianship have gained more mainstream acceptance in recent years. Musicians have increasingly been turning to medical professionals, physical therapists, and specialized techniques seeking relief from pain and prevention of serious injury. There exists a plurality of special techniques for an even greater plurality of potential difficulties. The Alexander Technique is just one example of these specialized approaches.

== Theory and history ==
To fully understand music being played, the student must learn the basics of the underlying music theory. Along with musical notation, students learn rhythmic techniques—like controlling tempo, recognizing time signatures, and the theory of harmony, including chords and key signatures. In addition to basic theory, a good teacher stresses musicality, or how to make the music sound good. This includes how to create good, pleasing tone, how to do musical phrasing, and how to use dynamics (loudness and softness) to make the piece or song more expressive.

Most music lessons include some instruction in the history of the type of music that the student is learning. When a student is taking Western classical music lessons, music teachers often spend some time explaining the different eras of western classical music, such as the Baroque Era, the Classical era, the Romantic Era, and the contemporary classical music era, because each era is associated with different styles of music and different performance practice techniques. Instrumental music from the Baroque era is often played in the 2000s as teaching pieces for piano students, string instrument players, and wind instrument players. If students just try to play these Baroque pieces by reading the notes from the score, they might not get the right type of interpretation. However, once a student learns that most Baroque instrumental music was associated with dances, such as the gavotte and the sarabande, and keyboard music from the Baroque era was played on the harpsichord or the pipe organ, a modern-day student is better able to understand how the piece should be played. If, for example, a cello player is assigned a gavotte that was originally written for harpsichord, this gives the student insight in how to play the piece. Since it is a dance, it should have a regular, clear pulse, rather than a Romantic era-style shifting tempo rubato. As well, since it was originally written for the harpsichord, a light-sounding keyboard instrument in which the strings are plucked with quills, this suggests that the notes should be played relatively lightly, and with spaces between each note, rather than in a full-bodied, sustained legato.

== Technical exercises ==
Although not universally accepted, many teachers drill students with the repetitive playing of certain patterns, such as scales, arpeggios, and rhythms. Scales are often taught because they are the building blocks of melody in most Western art music. In addition, there are flexibility studies, which make it physically easier to play the instrument. Percussion instruments use rudiments that help in the development of sticking patterns, roll techniques and other little nuances such as flams and drags.

There are sets of exercises for piano designed to stretch the connection between fourth and fifth fingers, making them more independent. Brass players practice lip slurs, which are unarticulated changes in embouchure between partials. Woodwind players (Saxophone, Clarinet, and Flute) have a multitude of exercises to help with tonguing techniques, finger dexterity, and tone development. Entire books of études have been written to this purpose.

== Repertoire ==
Teachers typically assign the student pieces (or songs for vocal students) of slowly increasing difficulty. These may include études, solo, or chamber repertoire. Besides using pieces to teach various musical rudiments (rhythm, harmony, pitch, etc.) and teach the elements of good playing (or singing) style, a good teacher also inspires more intangible qualities—such as expressiveness and musicianship. Pieces (or songs) may be more enjoyable for students than theory or scale exercises, and an emphasis on learning new pieces is usually required to maintain students' motivation. However, the teacher must not over-accommodate a student's desire for "fun" pieces. Often the student's idea of fun music is popular vocal selections, movie soundtracks, and TV show theme songs, etc. While some of these "fun" pieces can be performed, pieces should also be selected for pedagogical reasons, such as challenging the student and honing their skills. In addition, for students to be well rounded they must play many types of pieces by composers and songwriters from different eras, ranging from Renaissance music to pieces from the 20th and 21st century. A varied repertoire increases the student's musical understanding and skill.

== Examinations ==
A popular measure of progress, especially for children, is external assessment of the progress of the pupil by a regular examination. A number of exam boards assess pupils on music theory or practice. These are available for almost every musical instrument. A common method to mark progress is graded examinations—for example from grade 1 (beginner) to grade 8 (ready to enter higher study at music school). Some teachers prefer other methods of target-setting for their pupils. The most common is the pupil's concert, which gives experience in playing in public and under a certain degree of pressure, without outright criticism or a more or less arbitrary marking system. Another is the graded system of books followed by teachers of the Suzuki method, in which the completion of each book is celebrated, without a system of marking or ranking of pupils.

== Extra-musical benefits ==
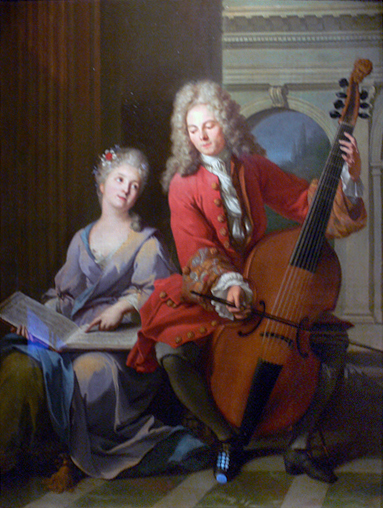
Jean-Marc Nattier, The music lesson, (1711)

Some studies suggests that music lessons provide children with important developmental benefits beyond simply the knowledge or skill of playing a musical instrument. Research suggests that musical lessons may enhance intelligence and academic achievement, build self-esteem and improve discipline. A recent Rockefeller Foundation Study found that music majors have the highest rate of admittance to medical schools, followed by biochemistry and the humanities. On SAT tests in the United States, the national average scores were 427 on the verbal and 476 on math. At the same time, music students averaged 465 on the verbal and 497 on the math – 38 and 21 points higher, respectively. It also reinforces the long-range links between them. Even more research shows that musical pedagogy can amplify verbal memory, spatial reasoning, and literacy skills.

Skills learned through the discipline of music may transfer to study skills, communication skills, and cognitive skills useful in every part of a child's studies at school, though. An in-depth Harvard University study found evidence that spatial-temporal reasoning improves when children learn to make music, and this kind of reasoning improves temporarily when adults listen to certain kinds of music, including Mozart. This finding (named The Mozart effect) suggests that music and spatial reasoning are related psychologically (i.e., they may rely on some of the same underlying skills) and perhaps neurologically as well. However, there has been considerable controversy over this as later researchers have failed to reproduce the original findings of Rauscher (e.g. Steele, Bass & Crook, 1999), questioned both theory and methodology of the original study (Fudis & Lembesis 2004) and suggested that the enhancing effects of music in experiments have been simply due to an increased level of arousal (Thompson, Schellenberg & Husain, 2001).

A relationship between music and the strengthening of math, dance, reading, creative thinking and visual arts skills has also been reported in literature. (Winner, Hetland, Sanni, as reported in The Arts and Academic Achievement – What the Evidence Shows, 2000) However recent findings by Dr. Levitin of McGill University in Montreal, Canada, undermines the suggested connection between musical ability and higher math skills. In a study conducted on patients with Williams syndrome (a genetic disorder causing low intelligence), he found that even though their intelligence was that of young children, they still possessed an unusually high level of musical ability.

== Pedagogy ==
Music lesson (also known as studio or applied music) pedagogy and instruction has many influences and aspects. Both the teaching methods and content of music lessons must be somewhat varied according to the level of the student, the goals of the lessons, the student's age, and the instructional context. Interpersonal rapport between student and teacher is another important element of studio music pedagogy. Other important factors important to student outcomes include how instructors communicate, their skills at teaching, how they organize their lessons, and how flexible they are to making adjustments. Some teachers also view physical proximity and energy as important aspects of music instruction.

Studio lesson teachers often embody different pedagogical approaches and philosophies. Two broad teaching philosophies can be categorized as the transfer approach and the transformative approach. The transfer approach is primarily performance and outcome-based. The most important goals of the lesson are confined to the technical quality of the musical performance. The transformative approach, by comparison, is rooted in constructivist educational philosophy and is not only concerned with technique and musical execution, but also with person-based learning and artistic processes. These two approaches show that musical technique is not necessarily the only goal of music lesson instruction.

Successful instructors are often deliberate and clear, explain practice strategies in detail, account for students' emotional needs, and elevate the long-term performance expectations for their students. The student's specific needs, strengths, and challenges can also influence the teacher's choice of pedagogy. High achieving students may be well suited to unmodified strategies, whereas intermediate students may benefit from modifications. For example, a studio teacher focused on a specific aspect of music and seeking high achievement in one area may momentarily accept a lower performance level on other aspects that are unrelated to the focus objective.

Understanding their student’s perspectives helps music lesson teachers support their students. A primary concern for any lesson instructor is student motivation for the long-term learning of an instrument. Student motivation pertains to how students of all ages develop the desire to study musical instruments, how and how much they value the learning, what influences their persistence/intensity of study, and student self-perception of success or failure. Motivation is a prerequisite for student development of adaptive behaviors that increase success in personal goals. Relevant to motivation are expectancy-value theory, self-efficacy constructs, flow theory, attribution theory, and mastery motivational patterns. Musical learning is also socially influenced by teachers, parents, and others.

Practicing by the student is another integral aspect of musical learning through music lessons. Student practice is often unsupervised and usually takes place outside of the lesson. Instructors often focus on teaching students how to practice using methods such as increasing the tempo of a piece from slow to faster, analyzing pieces, marking or annotating the music, setting practice goals, practicing in more frequent shorter sessions, and using a metronome. Teachers can influence students through the demonstration of practice methods or verbal description, although demonstration is often more effective.

Music lessons are an important part of both music performance and music education degree programs in higher education. Both music education and performance majors can expect to teach music lessons in their musical careers. Students benefit from courses which teach studio instructional methods, allow students to practice instructional techniques, engage in self-reflection, and refine their pedagogy.

== See also ==
- Band sectional
- Clinic (music)
- Five finger exercise
- Learning music by ear
- Master class
- Music Education
- School band
- Music Society
- Group piano
