= Barbara Lister-Sink =

American pianist (b.1947)

- Born: January 18, 1947 (age 79); Lexington, North Carolina, United States
- Genres: Classical
- Instrument: Piano
- Website: lister-sinkinstitute.org

Barbara Lister-Sink (born January 18, 1947) is an American classical pianist, music educator, and global leader in injury-preventive keyboard technique.

== Education ==
As a child and teenager, Lister-Sink studied piano at the Preparatory School of Salem College with Margaret Meuller and Clemens Sandresky. Lister-Sink graduated with a BA in Music in 1969 from Smith College, where she studied with the American composer and pianist John Duke. After suffering from tendinitis, she worked with Edith Grosz in Amsterdam and successfully overcame her injury. In the early 1970s, Lister-Sink also became interested in incorporating the Alexander Technique into a model of well-coordinated piano technique. In 1974, she studied with Guido Agosti at the Accademia Chigiana in Siena, Italy, and received a Certificate in Piano Performance. In 1977, she received a Soloist Diploma and Prix d'Excellence from the Utrecht Conservatory in Utrecht, Netherlands. In 2015, Lister-Sink received a Doctorate of Education (Ed.D.) from the Teachers College of Columbia University.

== Artist and Music Educator ==
From 1971-1975, Lister-Sink gave recitals and was a keyboardist with the Royal Concertgebouw Orchestra. From 1975-1976, she was a visiting lecturer at Duke University. From 1976-1979, she was a keyboardist with the North Carolina Symphony. From 1979-1986, Lister-Sink taught at the Eastman School of Music on the Artist Faculty as an Associate Professor of Piano. Since 1986, she has held numerous positions at Salem College in Winston-Salem, North Carolina, including Dean of the School of Music (1986-1992), Artist-in-Residence and Professor of Piano (1992-2009), Director of the School of Music (2009–present), and Salem Distinguished Professor (2013–present). She developed and currently directs the first Professional Certificate Program in Injury-Preventive Keyboard Technique (for pianists and organists) in the United States. She has also taught at Brevard Music Center, Chautauqua, and the Amsterdam Muziek Lyceum.

Lister-Sink is a Steinway Artist and has performed as a soloist and chamber musician in Europe and North America. She has collaborated with the Harvard Chamber Players, the Ying String Quartet, and contemporary composers such as György Ligeti, Leon Kirchner, Joseph Schwantner, Frank Martin, Samuel Adler, Vincent Persichetti, and Witold Lutoslawsk. Her recordings have been broadcast on NPR, the CBC, and Radio Netherlands

Lister-Sink has published articles about injury-preventive keyboard technique in Piano & Keyboard, Clavier, American Music Teacher, Keyboard Companion, Southern Medical Journal, and Current Research in Arts Medicine. She was cited in the 2000 Centennial Edition of Piano & Keyboard as one of the pedagogical leaders of the 20th century.

In October 2016, Lister-Sink gave a filmed presentation for TED Talks at TEDx Winston-Salem Women entitled "Pianists, Proceed at Your Own Peril."

== Freeing the Caged Bird ==
Lister-Sink is internationally known for her critically acclaimed DVD on piano technique, Freeing the Caged Bird: Developing Well-Coordinated, Injury-Preventive Piano Technique. It won the 2002 Music Teachers National Association "Frances Clark Keyboard Pedagogy National Award." Russian pianist and conductor Vladimir Ashkenazy praised it by writing, "I am sure that Freeing the Caged Bird will be of immense help to pianists – will make their lives easier and their piano playing more satisfying. A monumental work!"

In the DVD, Lister-Sink "demonstrates, explains, and corrects potentially obstructive habits by using her own concise step-by-step approach for teaching keyboard technique, from the most basic movements and sensations to the most complex technical challenges. Using in-depth, slow-motion analysis of playing on all levels, she demonstrates how well-coordinated piano technique frees the pianist's artistry from the cage of physical obstacles." Alexander Technique instructor Glenna Batson also "shows how the body is designed to work best with the piano" by applying principles of the Alexander Technique. The DVD provides solutions for musculoskeletal disorders arising from accumulated muscle tension and repetitive strain injury. These issues may be due to "structural imbalance, skeletal misalignment, and misunderstanding of basic biomechanics."

Freeing the Caged Bird received positive reviews from critics around the world, including Keyboard Magazine, Piano and Keyboard, European Piano Teachers Association Piano Journal, American Music Teacher, Society for the Teachers of Alexander Technique, Clavier, Notes, and Reginald Gerig (author of Famous Pianists and Their Technique).

== Recordings ==
- Sound Shaped by Fire: In Concert from the Eastman School of Music (1980-1984), 2-CD Set
- A Loving Home's A Happy Home: 19th Century Moravian Parlor Music
- Après un Rêve, with oboist William Banovetz

== Honors and awards ==
- Prix d’Excellence from Utrecht Conservatory
- Distinguished Professor of Piano and Artist-in-Residence at Salem College
- Music Teachers National Association - 2002 Frances Clark Keyboard Pedagogy National Award
