= The Virtuoso Pianist in 60 Exercises =

Collection of études by Charles-Louis Hanon

Last exercise from the Virtuoso Pianist
The 60th 'Shaking-fingering Etude'

The Virtuoso Pianist (Le Pianiste virtuose) by Charles-Louis Hanon (1819 – 1900), is a compilation of sixty exercises meant to train the pianist in speed, precision, agility, and strength of all of the fingers and flexibility in the wrists. First published in Boulogne, in 1873, The Virtuoso Pianist is Hanon's most well-known work, and is still widely used by piano instructors and pupils. However, the applicability of these nineteenth-century exercises has been questioned by some piano instructors today.

== Overview ==
The exercises are intended to address common problems which could hamper the performance abilities of a student. These include "crossing of the thumb", strengthening of the fourth and fifth fingers, and quadruple- and triple-trills. The exercises are meant to be individually mastered and then played consecutively in the sections they are placed in. Apart from increasing technical abilities of the student, when played in groups at higher speeds, the exercises will also help to increase endurance. The exercises are divided in three parts:

1. Exercises 1 - 20: Labeled "preparatory exercises", these are also the most famous exercises, and are used to develop finger strength and independence. Each exercise contains a sequence of 8 semiquavers, beginning on C, which is then repeated starting on D, and so on across two octaves. The exercise is then repeated in reverse down two octaves to the starting C. The exercises are intended to be practiced in groups of three, except for the first two which are practiced together.
2. Exercises 21 - 43: Labeled "further exercises for the development of a virtuoso technique." This more difficult section is meant to be played after the pianist has fully mastered Part 1. Part 2 includes scales and arpeggios.
3. Exercises 44 - 60: Labeled "virtuoso exercises for mastering the greatest technical difficulties." Since this section is considerably more difficult, Hanon recommends the mastery of both previous parts before proceeding to this one. This part includes repeated notes, repeated double notes, scales in thirds and octaves, tremolos, and more.

After all three parts are mastered, Hanon recommends all exercises be played through daily to retain technique.

== Criticisms ==
Some detractors, such as Abby Whiteside, have dismissed the very notion of finger independence which they are intended to encourage, insisting instead that only a technique based on the use of the humerus can be effective.

Hao Huang believes that "Hanon, Schmitt or Czerny have been useful for beginning pianists, affording variety as an alternative to endless practicing of scales and arpeggios" but warns against "the idea of technical exercises as panacea":

There is nothing more dulling than hours spent mindlessly going over finger patterns. This does not prepare you to be either a pianist or a musician. Too often, teachers assign technical exercises as a shortcut to technical mastery. It is easier to assign pages from an exercise book than to analyze and break down the physical elements in a specific difficult passage of music... Dorothy Taubman is one of the well known pedagogues who campaigns against technical exercises, asserting that they do far more damage than good. Certainly, indiscriminate practicing of exercises can damage a pianist just as forcing repetition of a difficult piece. In my mind, the question should not be whether or not to use technical exercises, as much as how to think physically at the piano.

== In other media ==
- The pianist and songwriter Bruce Hornsby wrote a song titled "Spider Fingers" which uses the technique from Exercise 47. Hornsby makes a reference to the technique in the lyrics: "It's just a little hand trick/A little prestidigitation/Better get out your Hanon/A little practice and repetition"
