= Ozorków =

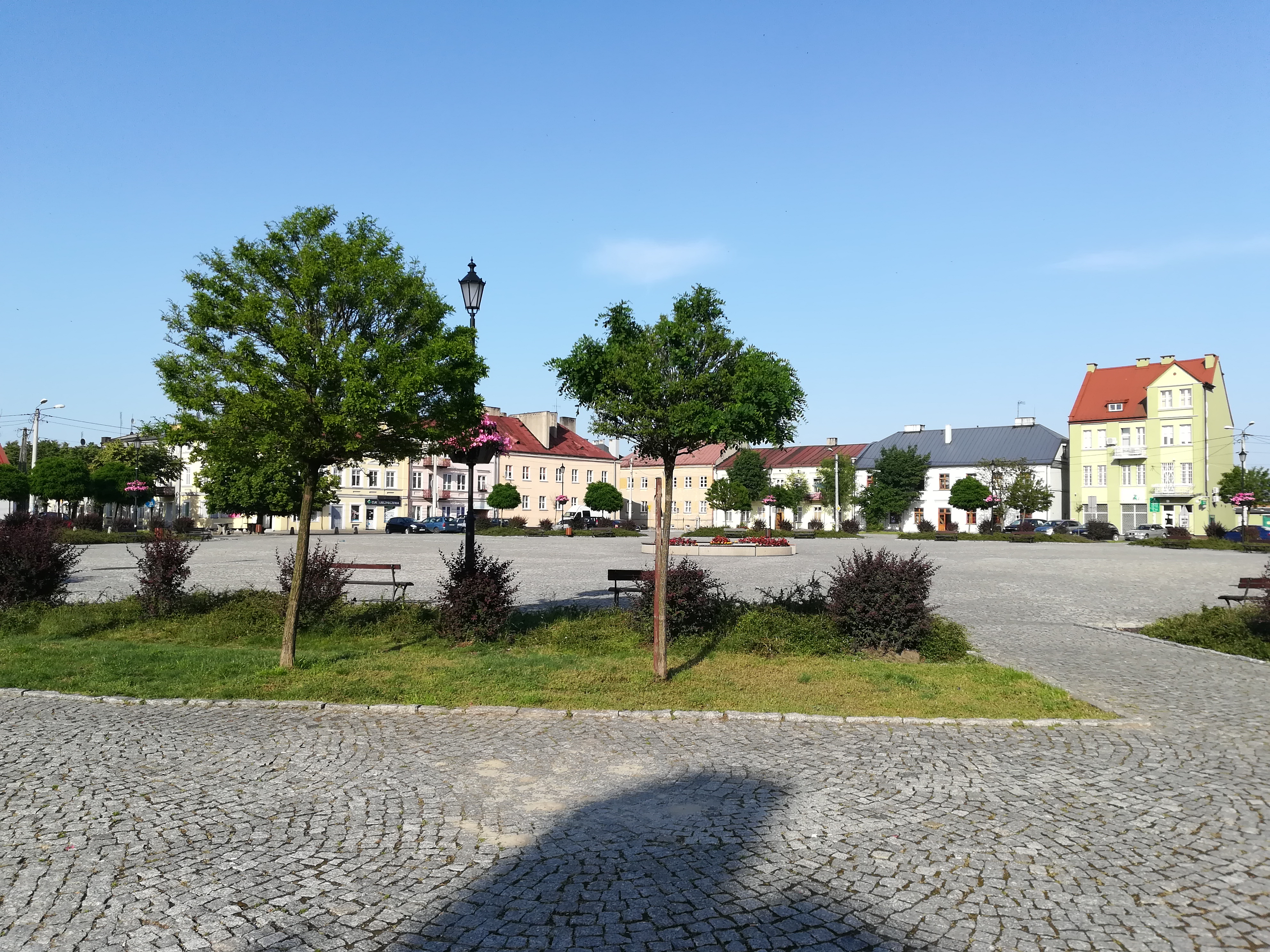
- John Paul II Square, former marketplace

- Flag Coat of arms

- Location within Poland
- Coordinates: 51°58′0″N 19°17′0″E
- Country: Poland
- Voivodeship: Łódź
- County: Zgierz
- Gmina: Ozorków (urban gmina)
- First mentioned: 1415
- Town rights: 1816

Government
  - Mayor: Jacek Socha

Area
  - Total: 15.47 km^{2} (5.97 sq mi)
- Highest elevation: 155 m (509 ft)
- Lowest elevation: 130 m (430 ft)

Population (31 December 2020)
  - Total: 19,128 ▼
  - Density: 1,236/km^{2} (3,202/sq mi)
- Time zone: UTC+1 (CET)
  - Summer (DST): UTC+2 (CEST)
- Postal code: 95-035, 95-036
- Car plates: EZG
- Primary airport: Łódź Władysław Reymont Airport
- Website: http://www.umozorkow.pl/

Ozorków [ɔˈzɔrkuf] (Yiddish: אוזורקוב, romanized: Ozorkov) is a town on the Bzura River in the Łódź metropolitan area in the Łódź Voivodeship in central Poland, with 19,128 inhabitants (2020).

== History ==
The city's history dates back to the fifteenth century. In 1415 a small village with inaccessible forests and swamps, belonging to the Szczawiński family was mentioned in one of the Polish chronicles.

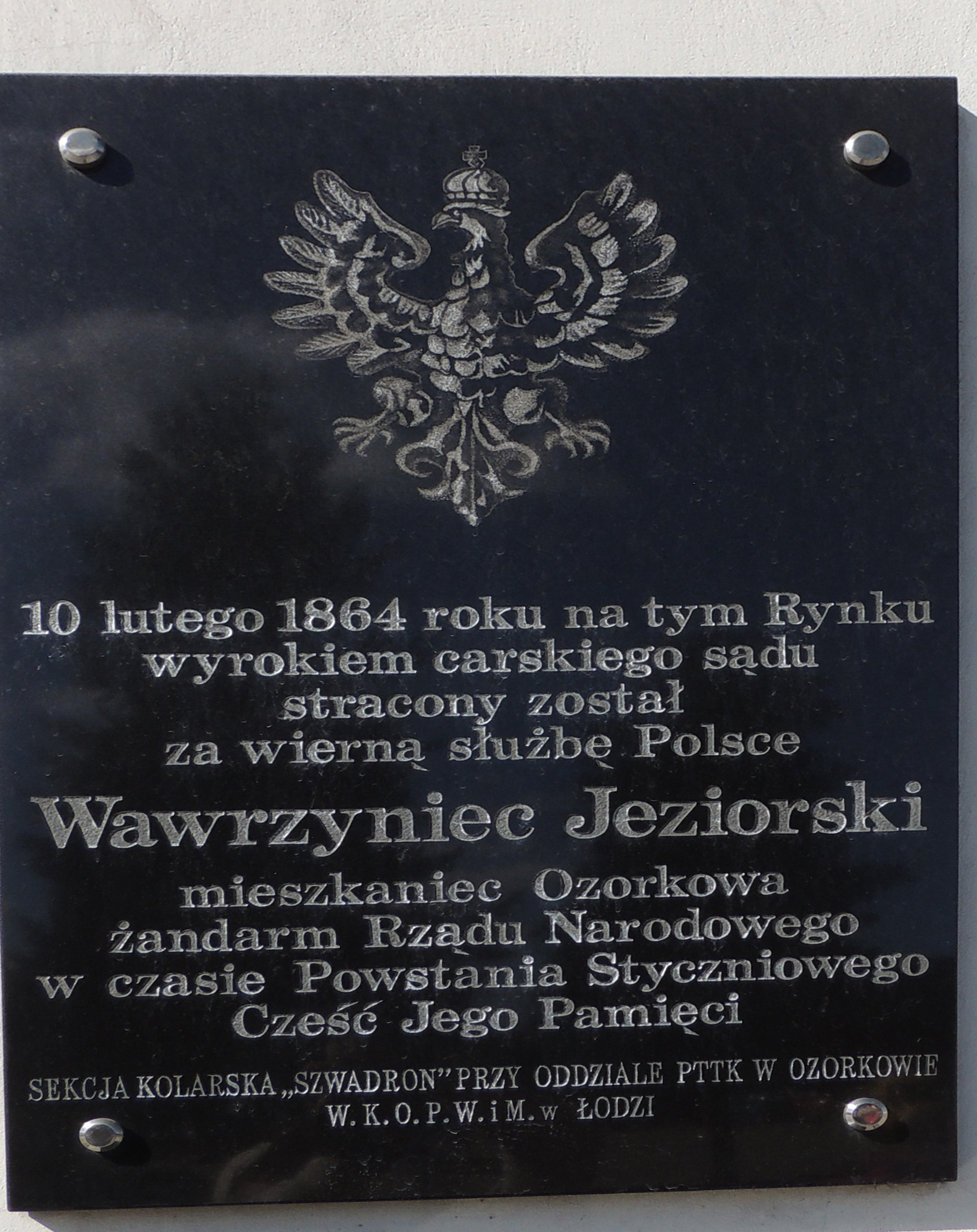
Memorial to Wawrzyniec Jeziorski

In 1807, the future owner of Ozorków, Ignacy Starzyński, hoping to expand his textile business, brought 19 drapers from Saxony to the village. In 1815, their number has risen to 117, while the city of Łódź had 331. A year later, in 1816, the village was granted town rights and became the capital of the Ozorków county. In 1821, the Schlösser brothers were brought by Ignacy Starzyński to Ozorków, and then Starzyński and the Schlösser brothers jointy founded a spinning mill. Equipped with modern spinning and carding machines from England and the Netherlands, the plant began production in 1823 and quickly achieved major sales in Poland, Lithuania and Russia, and expanded in the following years. Ozorków was the first settlement that experienced the modern development of cotton and wool industry near the Bzura River and later that spread to Zgierz and Łódź, creating the largest Polish center of the textile industry. Because of the rapidly growing industry started running out of space, already in 1820 business families purchased farmlands from nearby villages. In 1828 the town population rose to 5,669 people. Ozorków was inhabited by a sizeable population of Jewish and German citizens, therefore a synagogue and an Evangelical Church was built in the upcoming years, which also turned the town into a multicultural settlement. After the fall of the November Uprising, the town underwent a stagnation caused by the loss of orders for the army of Congress Poland, repressive tariff barriers, the growing role of Zgierz and Łódź, as well as the displacement of the market for cotton and wool fabrics. In 1864, during the January Uprising, the local leader of the Polish insurgents Wawrzyniec Jeziorski was hanged by the Russians at the Market Square. In 1866, under the control of Polish Count Feliks Łubieński, Ozorków became a protected city of the Russian Empire, which resulted in greater investment opportunities.

The First World War caused a further economic decline of the town. It was not until the period of independent statehood that it became more attractive for foreign and domestic investors. Already in the early twenties, Ozorków received a railway connection with Łódź and Kutno, and with the electrification of the town carried in 1928, a tramway was built between Ozorków, Zgierz and Łódź (between 1922 and 1928 the line was operated by a steam tram). During the interwar period (1918–1939) two public primary schools as well as a recreational centre were built in the town.

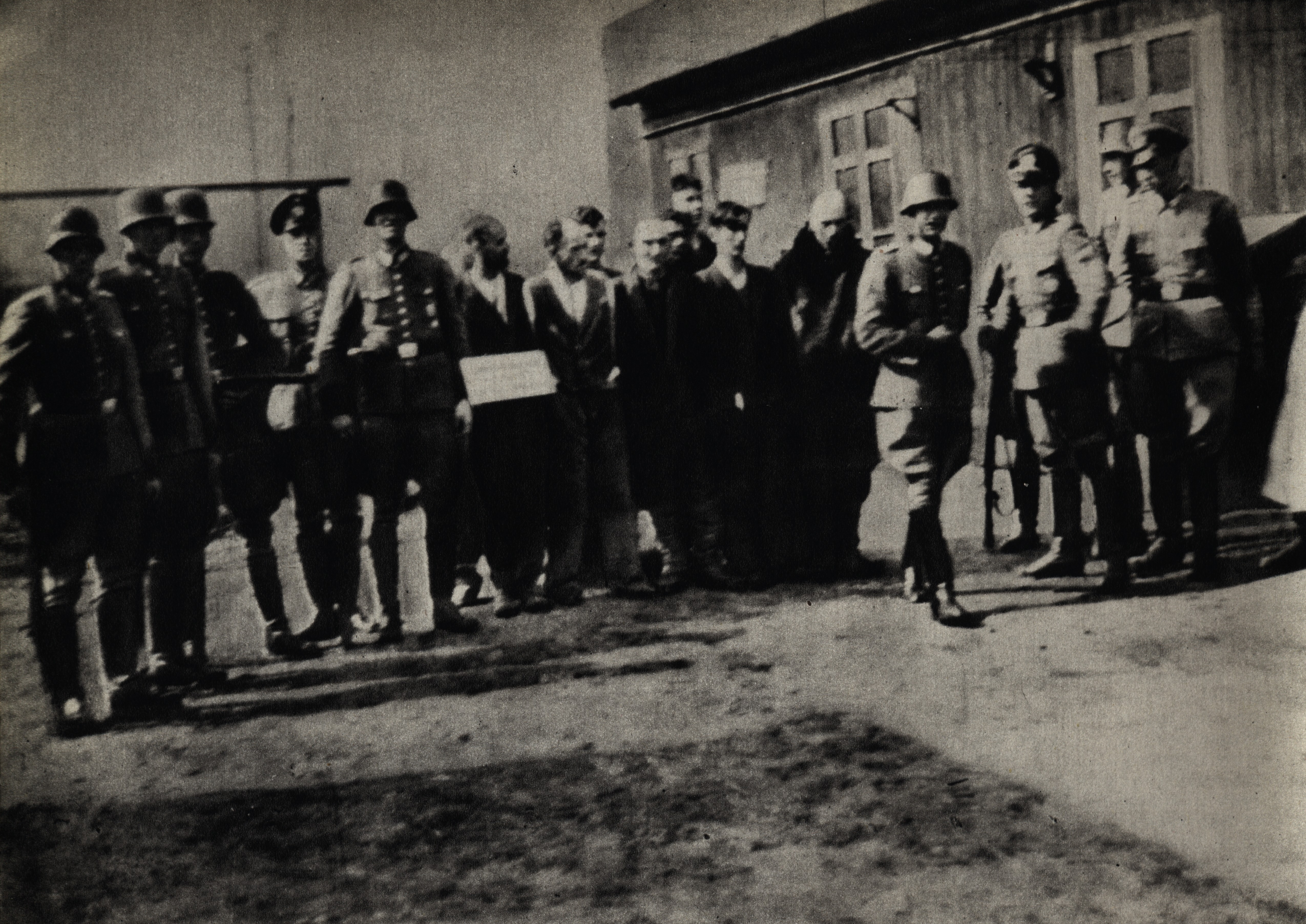
Jewish men led to execution by German gendarmes, 10 April 1942

The time of the German occupation of Poland (World War II), beginning in September 1939, was a tragic period in the history of the town. Already on September 12, 1939, the Germans murdered some inhabitants of Ozorków in a massacre of 13 Poles in nearby Łagiewniki (present-day district of Łódź). The town was incorporated directly into the Third Reich and between 1943 and 1945 it was called Brunnstadt. The extermination policy of the occupier (the murder of 6,000 Jews and the persecution of the Polish population) resulted in a drastic population decrease. In 1940, the Germans expelled hundreds of Poles from the town, and also established a transit camp at the local movie theater for Poles expelled from the area. Young people were then deported from the camp to forced labour in Germany, and children and older people were deported to the General Government (German-occupied central Poland), while their homes, shops and workshops were handed over to German colonists as part of the Lebensraum policy. Jews were forced into a ghetto, and some were afterwards murdered in the town. Hundreds were sent to the Chełmno extermination camp where they were gassed immediately. Others were forcibly taken to work camps or the Łódź Ghetto where they were later killed. Only a few survived. The historical synagogue located on Wyszyński Street was completely destroyed by German troops. There is some evidence that a few Poles brought food to Jewish neighbours in the ghetto.

After 1945, there was an expansion and modernization of the cotton and wool industry applied by the new Soviet-installed communist government, which stayed in power until the Fall of Communism in the 1980s. In the 1950s the development of housing and urban infrastructure resulted in rapid population increase.

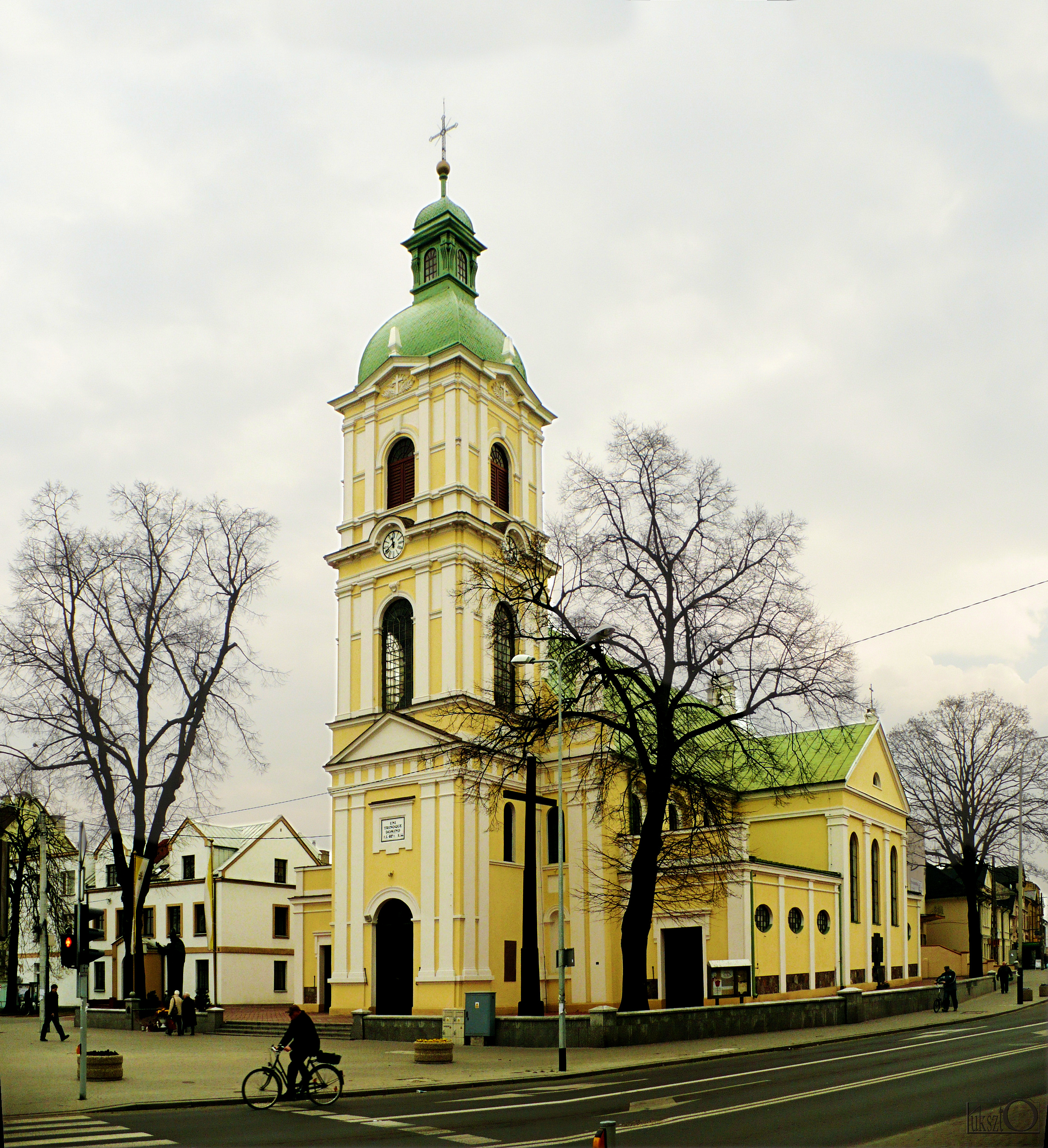
Saint Joseph's Church on the martketplace

Today Ozorków is rapidly increasing in the role of services and slowly loses its former industrial character.

== Demographics ==
Historical population

Year	Pop.	±%
1868	9,043	—
1890	10,152	+12.3%
1897	11,533	+13.6%
1921	12,589	+9.2%
1931	14,979	+19.0%

Year	Pop.	±%
1939	16,420	+9.6%
1950	13,901	−15.3%
1960	16,055	+15.5%
2010	20,189	+25.7%

== Notable residents ==
- Aron Brand (1910–1977), pediatric cardiologist
- Samuel Reshevsky (1911–1992), chessmaster
