= Edith Grosz =

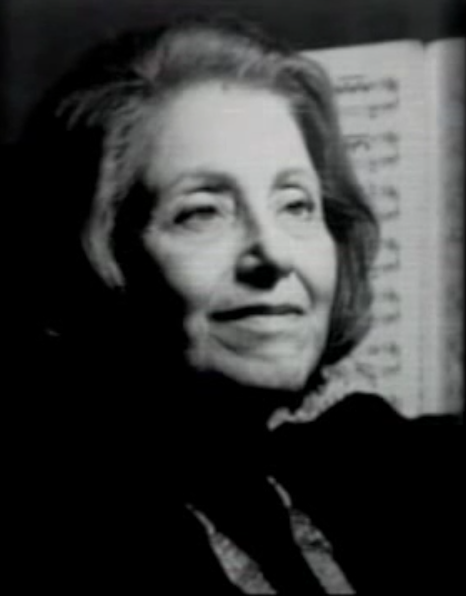

Background information
- Born: August 9, 1919; Philadelphia, Pennsylvania, United States
- Died: February 14, 2011 (aged 91); Amsterdam, Netherlands
- Genres: Classical
- Instrument: Piano

Edith Grosz (August 9, 1919 – February 14, 2011) was an American classical pianist and music educator, based in Amsterdam. She was born in Philadelphia in a Jewish family of Hungarian origin and was a sister of Bertram Myron Gross.

Grosz studied piano at the Juilliard School in New York with Olga Samaroff and Eduard Steuermann. She and her husband, violinist Isidor Lateiner, gave concerts internationally as a duo. They moved to the Netherlands in 1963.

Grosz became famous in the Netherlands through the chamber music series "Round of Romance" at the Concertgebouw, in which she appeared with Isidor Lateiner and cellist Godfried Hoogeveen. She was also a professor of piano at the Sweelinck Conservatory in Amsterdam where she trained generations of pianists, including Barbara Lister-Sink, Rian de Waal, Sebastian Huydts, Anna Nieukerken, Kees Wieringa, and Ad Wammes. Her teaching emphasized careful awareness of the musculoskeletal system, which helped form the basis of the "Lister-Sink Technique." She began a long-term relationship with the composer Jochem Slothouwer in the 1980s, and they were married in 2008.

In addition to her career as a musician and pedagogue, Grosz owned "Brasserie Rondo," a coffee shop where artists and students in Amsterdam convene.

== Discography ==
- Erich Wolfgang Korngold - Op.1 Trio in D and Quintet Op.15
- Julius Röntgen - Sonata for Cello and Piano (1900), Godfried Hoogeveen, cello and Edith Grosz, piano
- Julius Röntgen - Sonata for Cello and Piano in A, Op. 41 (1901), Godfried Hoogeveen, cello and Edith Grosz, piano
- Roy Travis - Duo concertante (1973), Isidor Lateiner, violin and Edith Grosz, piano
