= Aloys Schmitt =

German composer, pianist and music teacher (1788–1866)

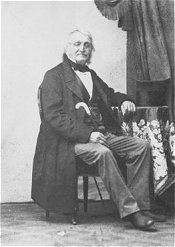

Aloys Schmitt (26 August 1788 – 25 July 1866) was a German composer, pianist and music teacher. He was born in Erlenbach am Main. He studied composition with Johann Anton André in Offenbach. In 1824 he was appointed court composer in Munich. He received an honorary doctorate from the University of Giessen.

Among his students were Ferdinand Hiller, Carl Almenräder, Carl Arnold and Carl Wolfsohn. See: List of music students by teacher: R to S#Aloys Schmitt.

His Preparatory Exercises (op. 16) remain important technical studies along with the Hanon exercises.

== Compositions ==
This in an incomplete list of his compositions.

- Etudes, Op. 16 (1820)
- Piano concerto No 1, Op. 60 (1824)
- Piano concerto No 2, Op. 76 (1834)
- Violin sonata, No 1, Op. 27 (1821)
- Violin sonata, No 2, Op. 64
- Violin sonata, No 3, Op. 66
- Violin sonata, No 4, Op. 118
- Violin sonata, No 5, Op. 123
- Violin sonata, No 6, Op. 132
