= Ernest So =

Ernest Hin-Leung So 蘇顯亮
- Born: June 1, 1978 (age 48); Hong Kong
- Instrument: piano

Ernest Hin-Leung So (Chinese: 蘇顯亮; born June 1, 1978) is a Hong Kong-born pianist who specialises in the works of lesser-known classical composers such as Sergei Bortkiewicz, Leopold Godowsky, Nikolai Medtner, Jean Wiener, Déodat de Séverac, Mario Ruiz Armengol, Federico Mompou, and Anatoly Alexandrov, among many others, including world premiere recordings of works by Lucien Wurmser and Abram Chasins. So's performances usually include impromptu deliveries on the provenance and contextual background of the pieces he is playing.

== Biography ==
Early in his career, So won the Best Performer Award in Singapore (1995) and the Beethoven Trophy (1995). He later attended the Manhattan School of Music and The Juilliard School in New York, where he studied under Jacob Lateiner, Solomon Mikowsky, Constance Keene, and Jonathan Feldman. So began touring China intensively in 2014, and has since been appointed as Honorary Professor of Music at numerous universities such as Jilin Normal University, Guangxi University and Jining University. He serves as an Affiliated Fellow at the Morningside College of the Chinese University of Hong Kong. From 2009 to 2019 he served as the Chief Technical Consultant of Asia Piano Japan Co. Ltd., where he oversaw the quality control of the company's piano restoration department.

When he is not performing, So devotes much of his time working with the Au Kim Hung Love & Care Association to provide charitable support for school-building and scholarship projects in impoverished areas of mainland China.

He currently lives in London.
