= Harvey Wedeen =

American pianist (1927–2015)

Harvey D. Wedeen (23 March 1927 – 13 March 2015) was an American classical pianist and piano teacher.

== Biography ==
Wedeen was born in Perth Amboy, New Jersey. As a youth, his musical training included piano studies with Isabelle Vengerova from 1944 to 1946, and subsequently with Robert Casadesus and Gaby Casadesus from 1946 to 1949. Wedeen earned a Bachelor of Arts degree in French literature from Columbia University in 1950. He attended the Juilliard School for studies in music and earned a Master's degree (M. S.) from Juilliard in 1960. His other studies in music included instruction in music theory from Nadia Boulanger at the American Conservatory of the Fontainebleau Schools. Wedeen also taught at the Hebrew Arts School and the Henry Street Settlement.

Wedeen joined the faculty of the Boyer College of Music and Dance at Temple University in Philadelphia in 1964. Wedeen played key roles in establishing and developing the performance, pedagogy, and early music programs at the keyboard department at Temple. Wedeen recruited to the keyboard department such musicians as Alexander Fiorillo, and harpsichordist and early music scholar Joyce Lindorff, and Lambert Orkis. His notable students included Charles Abramovic, Marc-André Hamelin, Marc Durand, Robert Durso, and Michael Tsalka. Wedeen received the 'Great Teacher Award' from Temple University in 1996. He served as chair of Boyer College's keyboard department until his retirement in 2012. He continued to teach at Temple University until shortly before his death.

Wedeen was the husband of American violinist and string teacher Helen Kwalwasser. The couple married in 1958, and had two daughters, Lisa and Laura. In 2011, they together received the Lifetime Achievement Award from The Musical Fund Society of Philadelphia. Lisa Wedeen became the Mary R. Morton Professor of Political Science and the College and co-director of the Chicago Center for Contemporary Theory at The University of Chicago. Wedeen and Kwalwasser were married until Wedeen's death on 13 March 2015. Kwalwasser, their two daughters, and their three grandchildren survive Wedeen.
