= Michael Tsalka =

Dutch-Israeli pianist and early keyboard performer

Michael Tsalka מיכאל צלקה
- Origin: Netherlands; Israel
- Genres: Classical, Baroque, Contemporary
- Occupations: Pianist, early keyboard performer
- Instruments: Piano, harpsichord, fortepiano, clavichord, square piano, positive organ
- Father: Dan Tsalka

Michael Tsalka (Hebrew: מיכאל צלקה) is a Dutch-Israeli pianist and early keyboard performer. He performs solo and chamber music from the Baroque to the Contemporary periods on the modern piano, harpsichord, fortepiano, clavichord, square piano and positive organ. Michael Tsalka, who is the oldest son of Israeli writer Dan Tsalka, performs throughout Europe, the U.S., Canada, Asia, and Latin America. Recent engagements include the Boston Early Music Festival, the Gasteig in Münich, the Metropolitan Museum in New York, the Forbidden City Concert Hall in Beijing, the Bellas Artes Theater in Mexico City, the Beethoven-Haus in Bonn, the Hermitage Festival in St. Petersburg, and full programs and interviews for radio stations in Hong Kong, Brussels, Amsterdam, Paris, Chicago, Berlin, Auckland, Buenos Aires, Mexico City, and Jerusalem.

== Career ==
Michael Tsalka graduated in 1995 with a bachelor's degree in piano performance from the Rubin Academy of Music at the Tel Aviv University. He then continued studying in Germany and Italy. In 2001, he received a piano solo diploma from the Scuola Superiore Internazionale del Trio di Trieste, where he studied with pianist Dario so Rosa. From 2002 to 2008, he resided in Philadelphia and studied at the Esther Boyer College of Music of Temple University with pianists Lambert Orkis, Harvey Wedeen, and harpsichordist Joyce Lindorff. Tsalka holds three degrees from that institution: a master's degree in chamber music/accompanying, a master's degree in harpsichord performance and a doctorate in piano performance. Other mentors included Darío di Rosa, Malcolm Bilson, David Shemer, Charles Rosen and Sandra Mangsen. From 2009 to 2011, Tsalka was a professor of harpsichord and chamber music at the Escuela Superior de Musica (CONACULTA / INBA). From 2011 to 2014 he taught at Musikskolan Lilla Akademien in Stockholm. Currently he is visiting professor at the School of Music of the University of Auckland. In addition, Dr. Michael Tsalka has presented over 160 master classes in academic institutions in all continents. From 2019-2024, he headed the keyboard Department at the Vanke Meisha Arts Academy (VMAA) in Shenzhen, China. He is also Artist in Residence at the Nelson Center for Musical Arts in New Zealand (2020, 2024). Since 2022, he is a Prof. at CUHK-SZ, China.

Michael Tsalka has released thirty-seven CDs for labels such as NAXOS, Grand Piano (Hong Kong), Paladino (Vienna), Brilliant Classics (Amsterdam), IMI (Tel-Aviv), Wirripang (Australia), Sheva Collection (London/Milano), and Ljud & Bild (Stockholm). Current and future recording projects include CDs dedicated to keyboard works by J. S. Bach, Daniel Gottlob Türk, Johann Baptist Wanhal, Carl Dittersdorf, W.A. Mozart, Ferdinand Ries, Franz Schubert, F. Chopin, Viktor Ullmann, Leonardo Coral, Paul Ben-Haim and Yehezkel Braun. His CDs have received excellent reviews and the attention of respected critics. In 2013 his recording of the Goldberg Variations on two clavichords was chosen as one of eight CDs of the year by MusicWeb International. More than fifty composers have dedicated works for Tsalka, which he premiered.

Tsalka was the Artistic director of festivals in Mainland China, Sweden, Spain, Finland, and the Netherlands. He was the co artistic director of the Nordic Historical Keyboard Festival (2012-2015). 2014-2019, he was the artistic director of the annual Geelvinck International Fortepiano Festival. Tsalka's students have been accepted in prestigious imstituitions, including the Mozarteum in Salzburg, the HDK in Berlin, Grieg Academy in Norway, and the Juilliard School of Music. Several of his students have recently won first prizes at International Piano competitions, for example, the International Mozart Competition in Shenzhen, and the Kingsburg International Piano Competition in Qingdao.
