= Aron Brand =

Israeli pediatric cardiologist (1910–1977)

Aron Brand Auraban
- ארון ברנד-אורבן
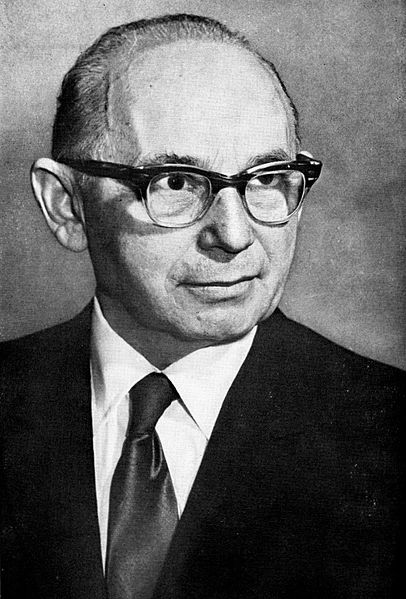
- Prof. Aron Brand-Auraban
- Born: 21 February 1910; Ozorków, Poland
- Died: 22 April 1977 (aged 67); Israel
- Occupation: Pediatric cardiologist
- Spouse: Esther Malka (Mala) Brand

Aron Brand-Auraban (Hebrew: ארון ברנד-אורבן; 21 February 1910 – 22 April 1977) was an Israeli pediatric cardiologist. He served as chairman of the Israel Medical Association in Jerusalem and founded the Jerusalem Academy of Medicine.

== Biography ==
Aron Brand grew up in Koło, where he attended heder and the Jewish gymnasium. His father, Natan, was a grain merchant and miller. In 1925, his father, a fervent Zionist, sent him to Palestine to study at Gymnasia Herzliya in Tel Aviv. In 1928, he studied philosophy and Jewish studies in Berlin. He studied simultaneously at the University of Berlin and the Hochschule fuer die Wissenschaft des Judentums. One of his classmates at the Hochschule was Abraham Joshua Heschel.

In 1935, Brand completed his doctoral thesis in the Friedrich-Wilhelms University of Berlin.

In the summer of 1939, Brand returned to Poland and married Esther Malka (Mala) née Aurbach, of Przedecz. By a stroke of luck, they left Poland one day before the Nazis invaded. At the time, Brand was a teacher at the Ma'aleh School in Jerusalem. The couple had three sons, Avraham, Natan and Haim.

== Medical career ==
In 1955, Brand founded the Jerusalem Academy of Medicine. From 1964 until 1976, he headed the Pediatric Department of Bikur Cholim Hospital in Jerusalem. In 1969–1970, he was a visiting associate professor of pediatrics at Harvard College in Boston, Massachusetts.

Brand published numerous articles on medicine, philosophy, literature and art, and organized hundreds of lectures and workshops open to the general public on health-related issues. In 1976, he was awarded the Henrietta Szold Prize for his contribution to public health.

== Commemoration ==
Rehov Aron Brand, a street in the Har Nof neighborhood of Jerusalem, is named after him.

== Published works ==
- Mechanik von Ventilbildungen an den Brustorganen in ihren Beziehungen zum Pneumothorax. Thesis (doctoral)- Friedrich-Wilhelms-Universität zu Berlin, 1935 (In German)
- The effect of added corticosteroids on the rates of recovery from beta-hemolytic streptococci in children with rheumatic fever under penicillin prophylaxis, Clinical Pediatrics,, vol. 16, 9
- Some Observations on the Epidemic of Asian Influenza in Jerusalem. International record of medicine, Volume 172, Hermes Press, 1959. p. 101
- Polygot medical pocket dictionary. ha-Aḳademyah li-refuʼah bi-Yerushalayim, 1976. 308 pp.
- Physical culture and medicine. (Hebrew: תרבות הגוף והרפואה). Wingate Institute. 1976. 104 pp.
- The Mysterious Illness of Moses Mendelssohn, Koroth, 6:7-8 (1974), pp.421-426

== See also ==
- List of Polish Jews
- Healthcare in Israel
