= Isidor Lateiner =

Cuban-born American musician

Isidor Lateiner 1976 on Southern Africa concert tour

Isidor Lateiner (January 8, 1930, Havana, Cuba – May 26, 2005, Amsterdam, Netherlands) was a Cuban-American violinist. He was the brother of pianist Jacob Lateiner.

Lateiner showed exceptional musical talent at a very early age. He began giving concerts at only 5 years old. Lateiner came to the United States when he was ten, and was awarded a scholarship to the Curtis Institute of Music in Philadelphia, where he studied with Lea Luboshutz and later with Ivan Galamian.

He later moved to Amsterdam, where he continued his career as a soloist and as a chamber music partner.

== Performing and recording career ==
At the age of fifteen he appeared with the Philadelphia Orchestra under Eugene Ormandy and later with orchestras such as the Berlin Philharmonic, the Concertgebouw Orchestra in the Netherlands and various radio orchestras making different recordings of the violin repertoire.

As a chamber musician, Lateiner's name is associated with those of Godfried Hoogeveen and Edith Grosz, to whom he was married and with whom he gave recitals throughout the world and made radio recordings in Europe. He taught at the Royal Conservatory in The Hague.

Lateiner made different recordings as a soloist of violin concertos and recorded the sonatas and partitas by Johann Sebastian Bach.

He commissioned composers such as Milton Babbitt, Matthias Kadar, Hans Kox and Jochem Slothouwer to write chamber music pieces and violin concertos for himself.
