= Helen Kwalwasser =

American violinist (1927–2017)

Helen Kwalwasser (October 11, 1927 – May 22, 2017) was a professor of violin at the Boyer College of Music and Dance at Temple University. In addition to spending nearly 50 years as a faculty member at the Boyer College, she had performed as a soloist and chamber musician with the New York Chamber Soloists and her music has been recorded for Odyssey Records, Vanguard, Westminster Records, Delos Records and Columbia Records. Her own accomplishments have been recognized at Temple with the Creative Achievement Award (1984) and the Lindback Award for Distinguished Teaching (1998), as well as the Inspiration Award from Temple Music Prep (2006).

In 2006, she was honored with a prestigious National Artist-Teacher Award from the American String Teachers Association.

From the beginning, Kwalwasser's career was influenced by her teachers, the first of whom were her parents, who handed her a violin at age 4. Natural talent earned Kwalwasser a full scholarship to the Curtis Institute of Music, where she studied with the legendary Efram Zimbalist, Sr. She later went on to study at Juilliard School with renowned pedagogue Ivan Galamian.

She was married to Harvey Wedeen, chairman of the Boyer keyboard department, who died in 2015.
