= Jacob Lateiner =

American musician (1928–2010)

Jacob Lateiner (March 31, 1928 – December 12, 2010) was a Cuban-American pianist.

== Early life and studies ==
Though born on March 31, 1928, Lateiner's father did not get around to registering his birth until May 31, the same year. He was the brother of violinist Isidor Lateiner.

Lateiner studied at the Curtis Institute of Music in Philadelphia with Isabelle Vengerova. He showed what turned out to be a lifelong interest in chamber music, studying with the violist William Primrose and the cellist Gregor Piatigorsky. He also studied privately with Arnold Schoenberg in 1950, and subsequently collected Schoenbergiana since that period. Notable students include Danae Kara, Michael Endres, Bruce Brubaker, Lowell Liebermann, Robert Taub, Laura Karpman, Ernest So, and Jarred Dunn (Lateiner's last student). See: List of music students by teacher: K to M#Jacob Lateiner.

== Performing and recording career ==
As a soloist, Lateiner appeared with many of the world's leading conductors, including Leonard Bernstein, Serge Koussevitzky, Erich Leinsdorf, Zubin Mehta, Georg Solti and George Szell. He was a champion of contemporary American music, and commissioned, premiered and recorded Elliott Carter's piano concerto. The premiere took place at Symphony Hall, Boston, on January 6, 1967, with Lateiner as soloist accompanied by the Boston Symphony Orchestra, with Erich Leinsdorf conducting. He also premiered the third piano sonata of Roger Sessions.

As a chamber musician, Lateiner's name is associated with those of Jascha Heifetz and Gregor Piatigorsky, with whom he shared a Grammy Award for their recording of Beethoven, and that of the Amadeus Quartet.

He taught at the Juilliard School, New York, from 1966 until his death, and had a concurrent appointment on the piano faculty of the Mannes College The New School for Music, since 1994. In 1984 he served on the jury of the Paloma O'Shea Santander International Piano Competition.

His career was marked by an interest in historical performance research. In 1992, he published an article on 'An Interpreter's Approach to Mozart' in the journal Early Music. In this, he was highly critical of many of the published editions of Mozart's music, instead advocating that performers should consult original sources themselves. He also collected early editions of classical music.

Lateiner died on December 12, 2010, in a New York City hospital.

A two-disc set of his live performances, The Lost Art of Jacob Lateiner, has been published by Parnassus Records.
