= Natan Brand =

Israeli pianist

Natan Brand (Hebrew: נתן ברנד; 1944 – December 6, 1990) was an Israeli classical pianist.

== Biography ==
Brand was the son of a doctor, Aron Brand, and his wife, Mala, Polish Jews who immigrated to Mandate Palestine days before the Nazi invasion of Poland in 1939. The family settled in Jerusalem. Brand began his studies as a child prodigy at the age of seven, with Haim Alexander at the Rubin Academy, where he later received an Artist's and Teacher's diploma. He made his orchestral debut at the age of 11, playing with the Israel Broadcasting Authority Symphony Orchestra.

Brand married Lori Hillman, with whom he had two sons, Jesse and Ari. He died in 1990 of lymphoma at age 46.

== Musical career ==
The pianist Nadia Reisenberg, pupil of Josef Hofmann, heard Brand play and arranged for him to study at the Mannes College of Music in New York. Later, Brand studied with Reisenberg at the Juilliard School. After attending Juilliard, Brand continued his studies with Dorothy Taubman, to whom he remained close until his death.

In 1969, Brand won the American Guild of Musical Artists Award, as well as first prize at the Société Musicale Ville-Marie competition. He also received the prestigious Josephine Fry award.

Natan Brand played in all the major halls of New York, where he made his home, and performed throughout the United States, Canada, and Israel. On international tours, he appeared in London, Paris, and Brussels. Brand tended to program his concerts around central themes. In 1983, he played a series of three concerts at Alice Tully Hall, devoting them separately to sonatas, fantasies and etudes. In 1984 he made his Carnegie Hall debut playing concertos by Schumann and Chopin.

In addition to his work as a performing artist, Brand also served on the faculty of the Hebrew Arts School in Manhattan, and taught at the University of Tulsa and at the Taubman Institute at Amherst College.

== Critical reception ==
Geoffrey Dorfman: "... Brand ... was one of the few keyboard artists—perhaps the last—in the true tradition of Anton Rubinstein: a pianist who played in the Grand Style, fully free to interpret the masterworks as the spirit moved him, with a magnificent technique at his command. His premature death at the age of 46 robbed the music world of a man who was considered by many connoisseurs to be potentially one of the world’s greatest pianists. That he was not so recognized was due to his mercurial temperament (which did him little good in the world of concerts and bookings) and his early death."

Patsy Morita, Allmusic: "Brand was a pianist who took an individual route to interpretation. Regardless of the music - whether it is the innocent Kinderszenen or the passionate Kreisleriana -- there is concentration and conviction in his playing that compels attention. It is not that he was aggressive, but that he was willing to try new things and did so with resolute confidence."

Bernard Holland, New York Times: "Brand has a strong musical personality, and he negotiated the familiar twists of and turns of Carnaval in ways that were original without being wilful. In other words, his use of pauses and his stretching of tempos often took unusual forms, but all seemed to have a sense of careful thought behind them. Mr. Brand's ear favored clear textures and high levels of energy. Despite the scattered missed notes, he seemed very much in control of himself and his instrument. The sophisticated articulation at quiet levels and the generally lyric feeling in all this playing were impressive."

== Discography ==
=== CD ===
- Palexa Records: Natan Brand in Concert, 1982-1990: The Legacy, Vol. 1 (Vol 2. has not been issued)
- Appian Publications & Recordings: 1990: Natan Brand in Recital
- BNL: 1987: Kreisleriana Op. 16 - Nocturne Op. 27 N° 2; Sonate Op. 35 N° 2 'la Marche Funèbre' - Studio Recording
