= Church Street School for Music and Art =

Art and music school in Tribeca, New York

Coordinates: 40°42′54.83″N 74°0′36.56″W

The Church Street School for Music and Art, located in Tribeca, New York, is a non-profit school for the arts established in 1990. It offers a variety of courses for children, teens, and adults principally in music but also in studio arts and related fields.

== History ==
The Church Street School was founded in 1990 by Lisa Ecklund-Flores and Lauri Bailey. The school enrolled 150 students with two instructors in its early years. Although it offers programming for all ages, its main audience is children. The school relocated several times to accommodate a growing student body and teaching faculty and to adapt to the increasingly expensive conditions of lower Manhattan. As of 2016, the school had 55 teaching artists-in-residence. Ecklund-Flores, who is also a professor of psychology at Mercy University and was an academic consultant for Blues Clues, stepped down as the Church Street School executive director in 2021. At the time, the school was noted to serve approximately 20,000 families in the New York Metropolitan area. The current executive director is Dr. Christina Placilla.

== Pedagogy ==
The Church Street School bases its work in the pedagogical theories of the Dalcroze eurythmics and has been cited as engaging a significant, potential alternative model to traditional music education. At the same time, the school also houses the Tribeca Jazz Institute which is a more traditional, jazz education conservatory for gifted, pre-college students interested in pursuing performing careers.
