= Abby Whiteside =

American piano teacher (1881–1956)

Abby Whiteside (August 27, 1881 Vermillion, South Dakota – December 10, 1956 Menlo Park, California) was an American piano teacher. She challenged the finger-centric approach of much classical piano teaching and instead advocated a holistic attitude in which the arm and torso are the conductors of a musical image conceived first in the mind.

== Life ==
Whiteside majored in music at the University of South Dakota. After a period spent teaching at the University of Oregon, she studied in Germany with Rudolf Ganz. On returning to the United States and teaching first in Oregon and then New York City, she slowly developed the ideas for which she became known.

== Ideas ==
Why spend dull hours with Hanon when the arm can easily furnish all the power that is needed without specialized training? If we could only believe in nature's way instead of in traditional concepts, so much wasted time, boredom, and ultimate frustration could be avoided.

— Mastering the Chopin Etudes and Other Essays, p. 178

The catalyst for the development of Whiteside's philosophy was the realisation that, as she wrote, "...the pupils in my studio played or didn't play, and that was that. The talented ones progressed, the others didn't--and I could do nothing about it."

Whiteside praised the natural ability of the child prodigy and the jazz pianist, and sought to understand how an untutored technique could be capable of virtuosity. One of her teaching principles stemming from that view was that piano pieces must be assimilated not so much as muscle memory, but as an intrinsic memory of musical content.

One of her pedagogical devices to achieve this was to practice works in different keys, or cross-handed, even simultaneously cross-handed in different keys. Then, upon returning to the correct key, hand positions, and tempo, a number of the previous problems in technique had been overcome. Another important device—used especially in the correct tempo of the piece, no matter how fast—is what she calls "outlining": skipping notes provided that the basic rhythm and body dynamics of motion were maintained. (Her term "basic rhythm" is explored below.) The pianist uses these techniques to establish the musical content as firmly in the mind as possible, replacing note-to-note technical concentration—and the attendant note-to-note musical attention—with accomplishment of the larger musical phrase.

In "Indispensables of Piano Playing" Whiteside describes a fulcrum system that a pianist uses for effective playing. She states that the finger is the fulcrum of the wrist, the wrist the fulcrum of the forearm, the forearm the fulcrum of the upper arm, the upper arm the fulcrum of the shoulder, and the shoulder the fulcrum of the upper body. Whiteside believed all these parts needed to act as one in order to produce good sound and the soul was the chief operator of this system.

In her view, fingers are almost useless as agents of either direction or force. Although they might be tutored with much patience to achieve a certain level of dexterity, they possess only limited strength and movement. Indeed, the fourth finger in particular possesses little of either. Instead, Whiteside advocated the use of the humerus as the principal force for producing a tone at the piano—the shoulder joint, being simultaneously powerful and subtle, is more than capable of doing all the work of any individual finger, and moreover is capable of maneuvering any finger into the optimum position such that a simple downward arm movement is required to sound a note. Thus "weak" fingers (i.e., the fourth finger) are not weak if they are driven by the force of the arm, and exercises to develop their "strength" are a waste of time.

More than even the arm, however, Whiteside advocated the concept of a basic rhythm—a somewhat specialized term in her writings which indicated an innate sense of phrasing present in all but the most unmusical humans. This rhythm informs every action involved in producing a musical phrase, with the torso, humerus, forearm, wrist and fingers forming a single mechanism to express it. Thus, trying to create a completely independent finger technique is inhibitive to the unified expression of a musical phrase and only encourages what she called "note-wise procedure"—conceiving music as a sequence of unconnected pitches rather than as a whole.

Whiteside considered the Chopin Études to be the exact point at which a finger-based technique broke down—only a technique which used the arm to direct the phrases conceived in the brain could even approach them. She was dismissive of the exercises of Czerny and Hanon.

Whiteside's sense of muscular use is partly along the lines of the Alexander technique; perhaps the best-known and best-formalized modern school was founded by Dorothy Taubman. (Taubman's method is now being carried forward by the Golandsky Institute.)

== Criticism ==
In spite of the results Whiteside achieved with her own pupils (many of whom were not promising when beginning lessons with her), a technique based on independence of the fingers continues to be widely taught; although the notion is now widespread that an effective arm technique is essential to fluent playing and avoiding repetitive strain injury, few teachers have been willing to entirely abandon the concept of finger drilling.

The very same Chopin Études on which she based much of her teaching had been a stumbling-block until her methods were applied. It might also have some relevance that Chopin himself is reported to have opposed this idea of equalizing the fingers, which was beginning to catch on in his time.

== Legacy ==
In addition to Robert Helps, two of Whiteside's pupils became noted teachers in their own right: Joseph Prostakoff, who taught the noted jazz pianist and educator Barry Harris, and Sophia Rosoff, who taught Harris as well as jazz pianists Fred Hersch and Ethan Iverson. Whiteside also tutored two American composers: Morton Gould and Vivian Fine. Miss Frankye A. Dixon another prominent pupil of Abbey Whiteside, who taught music at Howard University, in Washington, DC. She is the daughter of famed composer and musician the late Will H. Dixon, dubbed "The Original Dancing Conductor" by James Weldon Johnson, circa 1930.

In the late 1950s, Rosoff set up the Abby Whiteside Foundation, dedicated to promote her ideas, train teachers and performers and organize recitals by pianists trained in Whiteside's methods.

== Works ==
- Whiteside, Abby, 2003. Abby Whiteside on Piano Playing: Indispensables of Piano Playing, Mastering the Chopin Etudes and Other Essays. Joseph Prostakoff, Sophia Rosoff, eds. Amadeus Press, Portland. [Indispensables orig. pub. posthumously, 1955; Mastering orig. pub. posthumously, 1969]. ISBN 978-1-57467-020-2.
- Whiteside, Abby (1961). Indispensables of Piano Playing (2nd ed.). Charles Scribner's Sons, New York. ISBN 0-684-10653-1.

== Secondary literature ==
Ydefeldt, Stefan: Die einfache runde Bewegung am Klavier: Bewegungsphilosophien um 1900 und ihre Auswirkungen auf die heutige Klaviermethodik, (Augsburg 2018): Wissner Verlag orig. Schwedisch, ISBN 978-3-95786-136-8

Ydefeldt, Stefan: Musik und Bewegung beim Klavierspiel - 74 bedenkenswerte Übungen, Augsburg 2023, Wissner Verlag, orig. Schwedisch, ISBN 978-3-95786-341-6
