= Carl Almenräder =

German bassoonist, inventor and composer (1786–1843)

Carl Almenräder (3 October 1786 – 14 September 1843) was a German bassoonist, inventor and composer.

The design of the modern bassoon owes a great deal to Almenräder, who, assisted by the German acoustics researcher Gottfried Weber developed the 17-key bassoon whose range spanned three octaves and a half.

== Early years ==
The son of a teacher, Carl Almenräder was born in Ronsdorf near (Wuppertal. He taught himself to play the bassoon after he was given one when aged just 13. He started out in 1810 playing in a theatre orchestra in Cologne, but he switched to an orchestral position in Frankfurt in 1812 where by 1814 he was also obtaining solo work. He studied composition with Aloys Schmitt, and in 1814 he gave a public performance in Frankfurt of a rondo which he had himself written.

== Career progress ==
In 1817 Almenräder joined the Mainz theatre orchestra as a bassoonist. He was now working seriously on a year-long project to develop a technically improved bassoon featuring moving keys and an improved level of balance across the tonal range. By 1819 he had temporarily moved down river to Cologne where he joined his brothers in their workshop which focused on producing flutes and clarinets. In 1822 Almenräder joined the court orchestra of the Dukes of Nassau which was based at Biebrich am Rhein (today a suburb of Wiesbaden), and he was also engaged by the Mainz based music publisher Schott Music to advise on wind instrument production.

He died in Biebrich.

== Bassoon development ==
Almenräder's improvements to the bassoon began with an 1823 treatise in which he described ways of improving intonation, response, and technical ease of playing by means of augmenting and rearranging the keywork; subsequent articles further developed his ideas. Working at the Schott factory gave him the means to construct and test instruments according to these new designs, the results of which were published in Caecilia, Schott's house journal. Almenräder continued publishing and building instruments until his death, and Ludwig van Beethoven himself requested one of the newly made instruments after hearing of the papers.

== His own instrument production facility ==
In 1831 Almenräder started his own factory along with partner Johann Adam Heckel (1812-1877), producing woodwind instruments. He nevertheless continued to work with Schott as a proof reader, and as a tubing supplier. In 1843 he produced a comprehensive teaching manual for his 17-key bassoon which had a chromatic range of 4 octaves. After Almenräder's death in 1843 his business partner, Heckel continued the manufacturing business.

Following several further upgrades today's German Almenräder-Heckel bassoon comes with between 25 and 27 keys. It has spread far beyond German speaking central Europe, defining during the twentieth century the international standards for the instrument.

== Media ==
Potpourri: Introduzione - Allegretto
Performed by Arthur Grossman (bassoon) and Neil O'Doan (piano)

== Sources ==
- Baker's Biographical Dictionary of Musicians, by Theodore Baker, Alfred Remy, G. Schirmer, 1919, p. 15.
