= Group piano =

Group piano is the study of how to play the piano in a group setting. This contrasts with the more common individual/private lesson. Group piano originated at the beginning of the nineteenth century, and continues to be a widely used method of piano instruction. Group lesson formats include master classes, university classes, and pre-college music lessons. These classes typically have between 3 and 16 students. Benefits of the group lesson format include the development of independent learning, ensemble playing, critical listening skills, and exposure to a wide range of repertoire. Group piano instruction may require more space and equipment, increased preparation per class, and more attention to scheduling and group interaction than when teaching individual/private lessons.

== History ==
Group piano instruction can be traced to Johann Bernhard Logier (1777–1846). Logier, an Irish business man, developed a system of teaching that increased income for teachers while lowering the cost of lessons for students. His classes accommodated up to thirty students of differing skill levels. The focus of the class was developing music theory and keyboard theory rather than developing advanced technique. Due to the affordability of Logier's class format, it quickly gained traction in Great Britain, India, Ireland, and the United States.

Master classes were often taught by well-known pianist/composers. Clara Schumann, Franz Liszt, Felix Mendelssohn, Karl Tausig, Anton Rubinstein, Theodore Kullak, and Hans von Bülow were some of the most famous teachers to teach in this format. These classes occurred in the homes of teachers as well as in newly formed conservatories.

The Industrial Revolution and ensuing rise of the middle class in the 19th century provided increased opportunities for leisure activities and created a high demand for pianos. By the end of the 19th century, the United States was a world leader in the production of pianos, and families all over the country owned a piano and sought music instruction. In 1889 the U.S. Office of Education promoted class piano programs in elementary schools as a viable way for students to get an affordable music education. The first group piano classes in public schools launched in 1913 and grew until the 1930s. As a result, method books for teaching piano in the classroom began to be published. These included Young Student’s Piano Course by Earhart and Boyd (1918), Public School Class Method for Piano (1919) by Giddings and Gilman, and Steps for the Young Pianist (1919) by Hazel Kinsecella. By the end of the 1920s, over eight hundred elementary schools in the United States offered class piano programs, creating a demand for teacher training courses and certificate programs. However, in the 1930s, interest in elementary class piano programs began to decline due in part to the Great Depression and World War II.

As group piano declined in public elementary schools, group lessons in the college setting began to gain momentum. Throughout the 1930s and 1940s, Raymond Burrows, a professor at Columbia University Teachers College, pioneered collegiate group piano instruction using piano labs. By 1952, Burrows calculated that 256 universities in the United States provided group piano classes. These courses were designed to provide music majors with functional keyboard skills that would aid them in their musical careers; these classes focused on harmonization, transposition, and sight-reading. Because most university piano teachers were more familiar with the individual/private lesson format, universities began to offer courses in teaching group piano. Group piano lessons in the college setting continued to expand with the invention of the electronic keyboard laboratory, first achieved by Ball State University in 1956.

Independent pre-college piano studios continued to implement the group piano format. During the 1950s, 1960s, and 1970s, Robert Pace, James Bastien, and Frances Clark began to write books encouraging partner lessons, group lessons, and various combinations of group and private instruction. By the end of the 1970s, group piano was established as a profitable format for instruction. The Music Teachers National Association (MTNA) and the National Piano Foundation (NPF) began to provide training on teaching in groups, and journals such as American Music Teacher, Piano Quarterly, Keyboard Companion, and Clavier began publishing articles related to teaching in groups.

== Student populations ==
=== Pre-college ===
Pre-college group piano classes are designed for students ranging in age from 4 to 18. Groups are usually created based on student experience and skill level. Pre-college group piano lessons may take place in a private studio with multiple keyboards or a piano lab in a school. Lessons may include a mixture of playing piano and activities away from the piano. There are group piano method books available and most methods can be adapted to fit group lessons.

=== College ===
Most North American university music departments provide group piano classes. The National Association of Schools of Music (NASM), the principal U.S. accreditation organization of approximately 643 institutions educational programs in music and music-related disciplines, includes “keyboard competency” in their handbook as a necessary requirement for music students to graduate. Group piano classes are the most widely used format for teaching keyboard competency to college students due to their efficiency and the advantages of group learning. Advocates for collegiate group piano have stated that it is the “most effective and efficient tool” for enabling students to be independent learners so they can continue to make music for a lifetime. While NASM does not define "keyboard competency", there is a general consensus among universities that competency should include functional piano skills such as the playing of repertoire, harmonization, transposition, sight-reading, open score reading, and improvisation.

The structure of college level group piano classes varies by university. Group piano sequences typically involve 2 to 6 semesters, situated within the first 2 or 3 years of study. Goals of the group piano sequence include introducing and reinforcing functional keyboard skills, bringing students with varying musical background to a competent level by the end of the course, and nurturing enthusiasm for music in general and the piano specifically. At the end of the course sequence, music majors must often take a piano proficiency exam. Most piano proficiency exams require students to transpose, harmonize, sight-read, and perform a piece of solo piano repertoire.

=== Adults ===
Group piano lessons are often taken by adults as a hobby and for personal development. They may take place in a private studio with multiple keyboards or a piano lab in a college community program. Because of the wide range of students, groups should be formed based upon students’ lifespan development stage or level of experience. These lessons are often more flexible than pre-college and collegiate classes and involve more collaborative decision making. The relatively new field of andragogy can inform teachers that engage in the teaching of adult group piano. Sponsored by the National Piano Foundation (NPF) and the National Association of Music Merchants (NAMM), Recreational Music-Making (RMM) is an approach to teaching adults that recognizes personal, social, and health-based benefits to music study in addition to the development of musical skills and concepts.

== Class formats ==
=== Partner lessons ===
Partner lessons take place when two students share a lesson. They may share an entire lesson, or their lesson times may overlap. One student may come for 20 minutes of private instruction and then be joined by another student for 20 minutes of partnered instruction. After the partner time, the second student will receive 20 minutes of private instruction. In this way, each hour lesson provides opportunity for collaboration with a peer as well as private instruction from the teacher.

=== Hybrid ===
Hybrid piano lessons are any other combination of private and group piano lessons. This may include biweekly, monthly, or more occasional group meetings for students who are otherwise taking individual/private lessons. These types of lessons are often used as reinforcement of secondary or functional skills such as music history and music theory. Occasional master classes, where students perform and receive feedback publicly, may also supplement individual/private instruction. They provide students with performance opportunities and a chance to observe and learn from their peers.

== Advantages ==
Because students do not receive constant individualized attention in group lessons, they may learn to become independent learners. The environment requires students to problem-solve and internalize practice techniques. Group lessons provide ample opportunities for discussion, critical listening, structural analysis, study of historical contexts, and collective decision-making. Collective decision-making allows students to solve the problem on their own with guidance from both the teacher and peers. This social learning can assist with developing independent learning.

Group piano lessons also expose students to a wider range of experiences through repertoire, performance opportunities, and ensemble playing. Students not only become familiar with their own repertoire, they have the opportunity to learn and think critically of the music being learned by their peers. This format may also help alleviate performance anxiety. Students have an audience on a weekly basis, which establishes a learning environment in which playing music for others is a natural part of the learning process. Group lessons provide an environment in which ensemble skills may be developed. Students may play duets, trios, and more.

Some teachers have found that the group lesson format may increase motivation in piano students. They can be motivated by their fellow peers and develop more appreciation of the music through modeling. Peer learning might also create a sense of accountability within the cohort. Positive peer pressure encourages students to feel like they should master their piece for the class, either to avoid embarrassment or to contribute to the group.

== Disadvantages ==
Piano labs, multiple keyboards, headphones, and a conference system require more space and upfront cost than individual/private lessons. Group lessons also require more planning and preparation for teachers, as they teach multiple students at once and for longer time periods. Another disadvantage that may occur with group piano teaching is complications in developing and scheduling cohorts with similar experience levels and background.

== Additional resources ==
=== Method books ===
==== Pre-college ====
- Piano Camp by June C. Montgomery
- Alfred's Basic Group Piano Course by Willard A. Palmer
- 101 Ideas for Piano Group Class by Mary Ann Froehlick
- Creative Chords: Keyboard Improvisation Method by Bradley Sowash
- KeyNotes Music Program by Melanie Bowes
- Piano Pyramid® by Dorla Aparicio

==== Collegiate ====
- Alfred's Group Piano for Adults, 2nd Edition by E. L Lancaster and Kenon D. Renfrow
- Piano for the Developing Musician by Martha Hilley and Lynn Freman Olson
- Keyboard Musicianship by James Lyke, Tony Caramia, Reid Alexander, Geofrrey Haydon, and Ronald Chioldi
- Contemporary Class Piano by Elise Mach
- Piano Lab by Carolynn A. Lindemann
- eNovativePiano (online) by Susanna Garcia and Chan Kiat Lim

==== Adult ====
- I Used to Play Piano by E.L. Lancaster and Victoria McArthur.
- Returning to the Piano: A Refresher Book for Adults by Wendy Stevens
- Adult Piano Adventures by Nancy and Randall Faber
- Adult Piano Method by Fred Kern, Phillip Keveren, Barbara Kreader, and Mona Rejino
- Piano Fun for Adult Beginners by Brenda Dillon
- Piano 101 by E.L. Lancaster and Kenon D. Renfrow
- Piano Pyramid by Dorla Aparicio

=== Professional conferences, publications and organizations ===
- Music Teachers National Association Group Piano and Piano Pedagogy Conference (GP3)
- National Conference on Keyboard Pedagogy
- Piano Pedagogy Forum
- Clavier Companion
- American Music Teacher
