= Five-finger exercise =

Musical composition designed for hand exercise

A five-finger exercise is a musical composition designed primarily to exercise all five fingers of the hand. A typical example is Hanon's The Virtuoso Pianist in 60 Exercises.

Chopin wrote a number of études (studies) that are widely regarded as musical compositions to train musical ability and dexterity of the fingers, with his Op.10 and Op.25. Another example of an exercise to develop musical skills may be Für Elise, it has been suggested that it was written as an exercise to practice skills on the piano. It has since been rewritten for many other instruments.

The technique has also been part of scientific study. Another example being The art of piano playing: a scientific approach by George A. Kochevitsky, who explains some of the fundamentals in teaching the piano. In his chapter on Progressive ideas in nineteenth-century teaching he explains some of Chopin's idea's (see above), there is a mention of five-finger exercises.

== Other uses ==
Figuratively, a five-finger exercise or simply a finger exercise, is an exercise used solely to develop a skill: for example, in philosophy, economics, or writing.

As a mnemonic, it is a plan of Christian salvation in the Stone-Campbell Movement, where the five fingers represent "faith, repentance, baptism, remission of sins, gift of the Holy Spirit". It was introduced by Walter Scott in the 1820s.
