= Christophoros Stamboglis =

Greek operatic bass (born 1963)

- Born: 1963; Athens, Greece

Christophoros Stamboglis (Greek: Χριστόφορος Σταμπόγλης) is a Greek operatic bass.

Stamboglis was born in Athens, Greece. With The Royal Opera, he has sung Ramfis in Aida, Count Rodolfo in La sonnambula and Doctor Grenvil in La traviata. For the 2013/14 season, he will be singing Bartolo in Le nozze di Figaro.
