= Dorothy Taubman =

American music teacher (1917–2013)

Dorothy Taubman

Dorothy Taubman (August 16, 1917 – April 3, 2013) was an American music teacher, lecturer, and founder of the Taubman Institute of Piano. She developed the "Taubman Approach" to piano playing, an approach to technique that provoked controversy.

== Life ==
Taubman was born in the East New York section of Brooklyn on August 16, 1917. Her parents, Benjamin and Bertha, were Jewish immigrants from Russia; her father, a businessman, committed suicide after the stock market crashed in 1929. Taubman never graduated from college, but took courses at Juilliard and Columbia University and studied with the renowned pianist Rosalyn Tureck for a year. In her 20s, her son said, she decided her calling was to be a teacher, not a concert pianist.

Taubman directed the Dorothy Taubman Institute of Piano at Amherst College in Massachusetts from 1976 to 2002. She was formerly a professor at Temple University and at the Aaron Copland School of Music in Queens College, and was featured in numerous articles and interviewed in the Boston Globe, The New York Times, and the Los Angeles Times; and the Piano Quarterly, Piano and Keyboard, and Clavier magazines. Taubman was noted for her work with injured musicians. Her students include the American pianist Leon Fleisher, Edna Golandsky, Frank Lévy, Natan Brand, Yoheved Kaplinsky, and Terence Yung.

Besides offering a diagnostic system aimed at solving the musical and physiological problems of piano interpretation, the techniques Taubman pioneered have been used therapeutically to treat repetitive strain injuries related to piano playing, and generally to rehabilitate injured pianists. Her techniques have been adapted to computer keyboard typing.

In 1938 she married Harry Taubman, a businessman in the men’s clothing industry and the younger brother of Howard Taubman, chief music and theater critic in the 1950s and 1960s for The New York Times. With Harry, she had one son, who is dean of the school of medicine and dentistry at the University of Rochester.

== The Taubman Approach ==
The main tenets of the Taubman Approach are laid out in a series of videos titled "Taubman Techniques: Virtuosity in a Box". The tapes feature lectures and masterclasses by Dorothy Taubman and Edna Golandsky. The tapes deal with the following concepts:

1. Introductory Concepts
2. Forearm Rotation
3. Rotation & In and Out
4. The Walking Arm & Hand
5. Octaves; Shaping
6. Grouping
7. Leaps
8. Interdependence of Hands and Memory
9. Fingering
10. Tone, Legato, and Enslavement to Notation.

Since the death of Dorothy Taubman the approach has been expounded on in writing by Edna Golandsky, Mary Moran, and Terese Milanovic. Further video content exploring the approach has been hosted on the Golandsky Institute website, tonebase, and on Edna Golandsky's YouTube channel.

== Death ==
Taubman died from pneumonia on April 3, 2013 in Brooklyn, New York, at the age of 95.
