= Frances Clark (pianist) =

- Born: March 28, 1905; Goshen, Indiana, United States
- Died: April 17, 1998 (aged 93); Hightstown, New Jersey, United States
- Education: Kalamazoo College

Frances Oman Clark (March 28, 1905 – April 17, 1998) was an American pianist, pedagogue, and academic who authored, co-authored and edited many widely used piano method books, most notably The Music Tree series. Her 1955 publication, Time to Begin, introduced the concept of teaching music reading by pattern recognition, thus pioneering the "intervallic method," which "revolutionised" the teaching of music reading. Clark used the principles of other pedagogy fields by "teaching students how to learn" and applied them to piano for the first time.

== Biography ==
Clark received a bachelor's degree at Kalamazoo College in 1928 and completed graduate studies at the University of Michigan, The Juilliard School, the Paris Conservatory, and the American Academy at Fontainebleau. She holds an honorary Doctorate in Music from Kalamazoo College.

Clark served on the faculty at Kalamazoo College from 1945 to 1955, before joining the faculty of Westminster Choir College as department chair of piano performance and pedagogy with her colleague Louise Goss. In 1960, Clark and Goss co-founded The New School for Music Study (NSMS), the only post-graduate training center devoted exclusively to piano pedagogy research. They also authored an extensive collection of piano study materials entitled The Frances Clark Library for Piano Students. Clark was an adjunct professor of Piano Pedagogy at Westminster Choir College until 1994.

Clark won the Distinguished Achievement Award from the Kalamazoo College Alumni Association in 1987, and a Master Teacher Certificate from MTNA. Upon her death in April 1998, Ms. Clark was honored by the Irving S. Gilmore International Keyboard Festival; Ms. Goss accepted the honor on her behalf.

== Legacy ==
Upon Clark's death in 1998, colleagues Louise Goss, Sam Holland, and Elvina Pearce established The Frances Clark Center for Keyboard Pedagogy to expand the reach of NSMS and Clark's philosophies. All pedagogy materials created by the center are designed around Frances Clark's teaching philosophies: discovery-based learning, sound-before-sight and intervallic reading, development of complete musicianship at all levels of study, and the idea that "there is music in every child." The Frances Clark Center is a not-for-profit educational organization 501(c)(3) and a 509(a)(2) public charity.

The Center develops, tests, and disseminates new applications of Clark's teaching philosophy by studying music learning styles, effectiveness of published materials, and keyboard teacher training. NSMS continues as a research lab for music education and a year-round community music school. The Center publishes under Piano Education Press, Piano Pedagogy Forum, Piano Magazine, Piano Inspires Kids, and the Journal of Piano Research. It has an Online Teacher Education division with podcasts and webinars. It puts on the biennial conference NCKP: National Conference on Keyboard Pedagogy.
