= Golandsky Institute =

The Golandsky Institute is a not-for-profit organization dedicated to the Taubman Approach to piano playing. Led by Edna Golandsky, artistic director, the Institute holds an annual symposium at Princeton University and hosts workshops and master classes worldwide. The Golandsky Institute was founded in 2003 by Edna Golandsky, John Bloomfield, Robert Durso, and Mary Moran. It now has a teaching roster of fifteen faculty and associate faculty members as well as thirteen certified teachers from around the globe. The Institute serves pianists in 35 countries.

== Approach ==
The Taubman Approach is a comprehensive body of knowledge developed to train musicians in alignment and coordinate motion, which gives them the skills to play effortlessly and with a full range of artistic expression. It is a thorough and ongoing analysis of the mostly invisible motions that function underneath a virtuoso technique, including tone production and other components of expressive playing. Study of the approach has made it possible for pianists to overcome technical limitations as well as cure playing-related injuries.

== History ==
Edna Golandsky co-founded the Taubman Institute in 1976 with Dorothy Taubman and served as artistic director. Later, in 2003, Ms. Golandsky founded the Golandsky Institute to carry forward the Taubman Approach.
