= Edna Golandsky =

American classical pianist

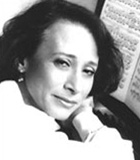

Edna Golandsky is a classical music pianist, lecturer and pedagogue of renown. She is a graduate of the Juilliard School, where she studied under Rosina Lhévinne and Adele Marcus. She later studied privately during many years with noted pedagogue Dorothy Taubman, whom she considers her main influence. She has earned wide acclaim throughout the United States and abroad for her extraordinary ability to solve technical problems at the instrument and for her penetrating musical insight. Many well-known concert pianists frequently play for her in her New York studio, including Enescu Competition winner Josu De Solaun Soto, Chopin Competition laureate Gabriela Montero and Leeds Competition winner Ilya Itin. Golandsky co-founded the Taubman Institute, of which she was Associate Artistic Director from 1976 to 2002. In June 2003, Golandsky and senior faculty members previously affiliated with the Taubman Institute formed the Golandsky Institute, which is a leading center for the study, advancement, and dissemination of the Taubman Approach. The institute conducts an annual symposium and festival every July at Princeton University.

Golandsky has lectured and conducted master classes at music institutions in the US, including the Eastman School of Music, Yale University, Harvard University, the Curtis Institute, and Oberlin Conservatory, as well as internationally. She has also presented at the Music Teacher's National Association, World Piano Pedagogy Conference, and the European Piano Teacher's Association. Golandsky has presented "The Taubman Technique" which is a 10 DVD box set explaining and demonstrating the Taubman Approach. In conjunction with the Golandsky Institute, she has further developed the Taubman Approach in the 3-DVD set, "The Art of Rhythmic Expression", and the 2-DVD set, "The Forgotten Lines: Lines that Support, Surround, and Intensify the Melody."(Golandsky Institute)

From 2010 to 2021, Golandsky worked with violinist Sophie Till to develop an application of the Taubman principles for string instruments at the Golandsky Institute in New York.

== Sources ==
- http://www.golandskyinstitute.org
- https://web.archive.org/web/20110201144853/http://taubman-institute.com/
- http://www.taubman-tapes.com
- http://www.healthytyping.com
- http://www.princetoninfo.com
