= List of Decca Records artists =

Decca Records is a recording label. A division of Universal Classics, it is also known as Decca Music Group.

== Classical ==
=== Vocal artists ===
- Roberto Alagna
- Ada Alsop
- Elly Ameling
- Arleen Auger
- Janet Baker
- Cecilia Bartoli
- Teresa Berganza
- Carlo Bergonzi
- Jussi Björling
- Andrea Bocelli
- Barbara Bonney
- Olga Borodina
- Jean Borthayre
- Catherine Bott
- Roger Bourdin
- James Bowman
- Montserrat Caballé
- Nicole Cabell
- Joseph Calleja
- Giuseppe Campora
- José Carreras
- Carmen Cavallaro and his Orchestra
- Franco Corelli
- Fernando Corena
- Armand Crabbe
- Régine Crespin
- Maud Cunitz
- José Cura
- Libero de Luca
- Suzanne Danco
- Mario del Monaco
- Lisa Della Casa
- Alfred Deller
- Anton Dermota
- Giuseppe Di Stefano
- Plácido Domingo
- Otto Edelmann
- Margreta Elkins
- Kathleen Ferrier
- Dietrich Fischer-Dieskau
- Kirsten Flagstad
- Renée Fleming
- Juan Diego Flórez
- Mirella Freni
- Angela Gheorghiu
- Nicolai Ghiaurov
- Matthias Goerne
- Galina Gorchakova
- Hilde Gueden
- Thomas Hayward
- Judith Hellwig
- Roy Henderson
- Wolfgang Holzmair
- Marilyn Horne
- Dmitri Hvorostovsky
- Giovanni Inghilleri
- Jacques Jansen
- Sumi Jo
- Louis Jordan
- Endre Koreh
- Jonas Kaufmann
- Richard Lewis
- Wilma Lipp
- David Lloyd
- George London
- Emmy Loose
- Christa Ludwig
- Walther Ludwig
- Enzo Mascherini
- Karita Mattila
- Sylvia McNair
- Janine Micheau
- Sherrill Milnes
- Liza Minnelli
- Martha Mödl
- Birgit Nilsson
- Magda Olivero
- Jessye Norman
- Julius Patzak
- Luciano Pavarotti
- Peter Pears
- Alfred Poell
- Giacinto Prandelli
- Leontyne Price
- Margaret Price
- Ruggero Raimondi
- Samuel Ramey
- Maria Reining
- Katia Ricciarelli
- Mado Robin
- Helge Rosvaenge
- Erna Sack
- Heinrich Schlusnus
- Paul Schoeffler
- Andreas Scholl
- Renata Scotto
- Anja Silja
- Gérard Souzay
- Cheryl Studer
- Isabel Suckling
- Joan Sutherland
- Kiri Te Kanawa
- Renata Tebaldi
- Bryn Terfel
- Conrad Thibault
- Günther Treptow
- Hermann Uhde
- Giuseppe Valdengo
- Arnold van Mill
- Anne Sofie von Otter
- Jennifer Vyvyan
- Anthony Way
- Ludwig Weber
- Ljuba Welitsch
- Wolfgang Windgassen
- Marcel Wittrisch
- Laura Wright
- Sophie Wyss
- Eugenia Zareska

=== Conductors ===
- Otto Ackermann
- Leroy Anderson
- Franz André
- Ernest Ansermet
- Ataúlfo Argenta
- Vladimir Ashkenazy
- Krešimir Baranović
- Samuel Barber
- Sir Thomas Beecham
- Sidney Beer
- Eduard van Beinum
- Anthony Bernard
- Leonard Bernstein
- Harry Blech
- Leo Blech
- Ernest Bloch
- Herbert Blomstedt
- Karl Böhm
- Richard Bonynge
- Sir Adrian Boult
- Warwick Braithwaite
- Benjamin Britten
- Frans Brüggen
- Basil Cameron
- Sergiu Celibidache
- Riccardo Chailly
- Albert Coates
- Eric Coates
- Anthony Collins
- Piero Coppola
- Sir Colin Davis
- Robert Denzler
- Roger Désormière
- Christoph von Dohnányi
- Antal Doráti
- Charles Dutoit
- Georges Enesco
- Alberto Erede
- Robert Farnon
- Iván Fischer
- Anatole Fistoulari
- Grzegorz Fitelberg
- Øivin Fjeldstad
- Wilhelm Furtwängler
- Pierino Gamba
- John Eliot Gardiner
- Valery Gergiev
- Isidore Godfrey
- Walter Goehr
- Bernard Haitink
- Sir Hamilton Harty
- Christopher Hogwood
- Heinrich Hollreiser
- Robert Irving
- Herbert von Karajan
- Reginald Jacques
- Thomas Jensen
- Enrique Jordá
- István Kertész
- Royalton Kisch
- Erich Kleiber
- Hans Knappertsbusch
- Clemens Krauss
- Josef Krips
- Rafael Kubelík
- Franz Lehár
- Erich Leinsdorf
- Edouard Lindenberg
- Peter Maag
- Lorin Maazel
- Sir Charles Mackerras
- Klaus Mäkelä
- Nikolai Malko
- Sir Neville Marriner
- Jean Martinon
- Zubin Mehta
- Francesco Molinari-Pradelli
- Rudolf Moralt
- Charles Munch
- Karl Münchinger
- Riccardo Muti
- Boyd Neel
- Victor Olof
- Seiji Ozawa
- Philip Pickett
- André Previn
- Fernando Previtali
- Karl Rankl
- Victor Reinshagen
- Christophe Rousset
- Paul Sacher
- Sir Malcolm Sargent
- Hermann Scherchen
- Hans Schmidt-Isserstedt
- Carl Schuricht
- Georges Sébastien
- Ivan Semenoff
- Sir Georg Solti
- Fritz Stiedry
- Robert Stolz
- Oscar Straus
- George Szell
- Stig Westerberg
- Mogens Wöldike
- Albert Wolff
- Eric Tuxen

=== Instrumentalists ===
- Valentina Lisitsa
- Salvatore Accardo
- Martha Argerich
- Claudio Arrau
- Vladimir Ashkenazy
- Wilhelm Backhaus
- Ellen Ballon
- Pierre Barbizet
- Antoine de Bavier
- Joshua Bell
- Yvonne Blanc
- Jacqueline Blancard
- Felicja Blumental
- Jorge Bolet
- Julian Bream
- Alfred Brendel
- Benjamin Britten
- Alfredo Campoli
- Kyung Wha Chung
- Aaron Copland
- Clifford Curzon
- Alicia de Larrocha
- Jeanne Demessieux
- Marcel Dupré
- Ludovico Einaudi
- Osian Ellis
- Mischa Elman
- Christian Ferras
- Julia Fischer
- Myers Foggin
- Pierre Fournier
- Nelson Freire
- Walther Frey
- Maurice Gendron
- Max Gilbert
- Arnold Goldsbrough
- Vicente Gómez
- Isador Goodman
- Frederick Grinke
- Arthur Grumiaux
- Friedrich Gulda
- Monique Haas
- Ida Haendel
- Håkan Hardenberger
- Clara Haskil
- Heinz Holliger
- Florence Hooton
- Peter Hurford
- Nobuko Imai
- Janine Jansen
- Leila Josefowicz
- Anton Karas
- Julius Katchen
- Peter Katin
- Wilhelm Kempff
- Zoltán Kocsis
- Gidon Kremer
- Georg Kulenkampff
- Charlie Kunz
- Katia and Marielle Labèque
- Alexandre Lagoya
- Chad Lawson
- Kathleen Long
- Radu Lupu
- Moura Lympany
- Nikita Magaloff
- Enrico Mainardi
- George Malcolm
- Stephan Moccio
- Viktoria Mullova
- Kaori Muraji
- Zara Nelsova
- David Oistrakh
- Gabríel Ólafs
- Franz Osborn
- Kun Woo Paik
- Walter Panhoffer
- Itzhak Perlman
- Anthony Pini
- André Previn
- Ossy Renardy
- Ruggiero Ricci
- Sviatoslav Richter
- Pascal Rogé
- Pepe Romero
- Max Rostal
- Mstislav Rostropovich
- Christophe Rousset
- Joseph Saxby
- András Schiff
- Heinrich Schiff
- Andrés Segovia
- Guilhermina Suggia
- Akiko Suwanai
- Henryk Szeryng
- Jean-Yves Thibaudet
- Frederick Thurston
- Mitsuko Uchida
- Andrea Vanzo
- Julian Lloyd Webber
- Mary O'Hara

=== Ensembles ===
- Amadeus Quartet
- Amsterdam Quartet
- Beaux Arts Trio
- Boskovsky Quartet
- Carmirelli Quartet
- Griller Quartet
- Grimethorpe Colliery Band
- Koppel Quartet
- I Musici
- Musica Vitalis Quartet
- New Italian Quartet
- Orford String Quartet
- Quartetto Italiano
- Quintetto Chigiano
- Takács Quartet
- Trio di Trieste
- Vegh Quartet
- Vienna Octet
- Polteau Instrumental Ensemble
- D'Oyly Carte Opera Company
- Choir of King's College, Cambridge
- The Purcell Singers

=== Orchestras ===
- Belgrade National Opera Orchestra
- Boyd Neel String Orchestra
- BBC Theatre Orchestra
- Amsterdam Concertgebouw Orchestra
- Hamburg Radio Symphony Orchestra
- Hungarian State Symphony Orchestra
- Kingsway Symphony Orchestra
- London Chamber Orchestra
- London Mozart Orchestra
- London Philharmonic Orchestra
- London Symphony Orchestra
- London Theatre Orchestra
- Maggio Musicale Fiorentino Orchestra
- New Symphony Orchestra
- Paris Conservatoire Orchestra
- Orchestre de la Suisse Romande
- Radio Orchestra, Beromünster
- Radio Symphony Orchestra, Copenhagen
- Santa Cecilia Orchestra
- Stockholm Radio Orchestra
- Stuttgart Chamber Orchestra
- Tonhalle Orchester Zurich
- Turin Symphony Orchestra
- Vienna Philharmonic Orchestra
- Vienna Symphony Orchestra
- Zurich Collegium Musicum

== Non-classical ==
=== Film composers ===
- John Barry
- Jerry Goldsmith
- James Horner
- Michael Kamen
- Michael Nyman
- Alan Silvestri
- John Williams
- Hans Zimmer

=== Jazz and popular artists released on Decca Records (US) label ===
- The Andrews Sisters
- Toni Arden
- Louis Armstrong
- Banana Splits
- Len Barry
- Vincent Bell
- Elmer Bernstein & Orchestra
- Owen Bradley Quintet
- Bob Braun
- Erskine Butterfield and his Blue Boys
- Don Cherry
- Rosemary Clooney
- Deborah Cox
- Jacob Collier
- Crazy Otto
- Bing Crosby
- The Cuff Links
- Bobby Darin
- Sammy Davis Jr.
- Lenny Dee
- Jimmy Dorsey & His Orchestra
- Tommy Dorsey & His Orchestra
- The Dream Weavers
- Deanna Durbin
- Yvonne Elliman
- Duke Ellington & His Orchestra
- Sophie Ellis-Bextor
- Paul Evans
- Eddie Fontaine
- The Four Aces
- The Free Movement
- Judy Garland
- Jimmie Gordon
- Teddy Grace
- Earl Grant
- Dobie Gray
- Glen Gray & the Casa Loma Orchestra
- Keith Green
- Bill Haley & His Comets
- Adelaide Hall
- Glass Harp
- Bobby Helms
- Woody Herman & His Orchestra
- Milt Herth Trio
- Al Hibbler
- Billie Holiday
- Burl Ives
- Al Jolson
- Bert Kaempfert
- The Kalin Twins
- Kitty Kallen
- Sammy Kaye & His Orchestra
- The Kingston Trio
- Peggy Lee
- Jerry Lewis
- Guy Lombardo & the Royal Canadians
- Matthew's Southern Comfort
- Robert Maxwell & Orchestra
- Barrelhouse Buck McFarland
- Glenn Miller & His Orchestra
- The Mills Brothers
- Domenico Modugno (Italy)
- Russ Morgan
- Maurice Rocco
- Rick Nelson & the Stone Canyon Band
- Les Paul and His Trio
- The Peppermint Rainbow
- Artie Shaw
- Georgie Shaw
- Ethel Smith
- The Spokesmen
- Morris Stoloff/Columbia Pictures Orchestra
- The Surfaris
- Sylvia Syms
- Debbie Taylor
- The Tyrones
- The Weavers
- The Who
- Wishbone Ash
- Victor Young & His Orchestra
- Helmut Zacharias (Germany)

=== Artists under the Decca Nashville label ===
- Gary Allan
- Rhett Akins
- Bill Anderson
- Jan Howard
- Jeannie Seely
- Jack Greene
- Mark Chesnutt
- Patsy Cline
- Helen Darling
- Roy Drusky
- Red Foley
- Rebecca Lynn Howard
- Chris Knight
- Brenda Lee
- Ronnie Dove
- Danni Leigh
- Loretta Lynn
- Grady Martin
- Moon Mullican
- One Flew South
- Dolly Parton
- Frazier River
- Webb Pierce
- Dawn Sears
- Shane Stockton
- Conway Twitty
- Kitty Wells
- Lee Ann Womack

=== Pop/rock artists who had more than one hit on Decca Records (UK) ===
- Father Abraham and The Smurfs (Netherlands)
- Chris Andrews
- The Animals (formerly on Columbia)
- The Applejacks
- Arrival (1971 to CBS)
- Winifred Atwell
- The Bachelors (Ireland)
- Dave Berry
- The Beverley Sisters
- The Big Three
- Los Bravos (Spain)
- Max Bygraves
- The Casuals
- Frank Chacksfield
- Jess Conrad
- Lyn Cornell
- Billy Cotton and his Band (first on Rex)
- Dana (on Rex)
- Billie Davis
- Terry Dene
- Jackie Dennis
- The Dennisons
- Karl Denver
- Ken Dodd (later on Columbia)
- Val Doonican (later on Pye, Philips)
- East of Eden
- Bern Elliott and the Fenmen
- Marianne Faithfull (later on Island)
- The Fortunes (later on Capitol)
- Billy Fury (later on Polydor)
- The Goons
- Jet Harris & Tony Meehan
- Ted Heath
- Heinz (later on Columbia)
- Engelbert Humperdinck
- The Johnston Brothers
- Tom Jones (later on Epic)
- Eden Kane (later on Fontana)
- Jonathan King (later formed UK Records)
- Kathy Kirby
- Lee Lawrence
- The Lumineers
- Mike Preston
- Alan Price (several other labels)
- P.J. Proby (later on Liberty)
- The Redskins
- Joan Regan (later on Pye)
- Neil Reid
- Paddy Roberts
- Lord Rockingham's XI
- The Rolling Stones (formed Rolling Stones Records in 1970)
- Lita Roza
- Paul & Barry Ryan
- Crispian St. Peters
- Doug Sheldon
- Peter Skellern
- The Small Faces (to Immediate in 1967)
- Cyril Stapleton
- The Stargazers
- The Sundowners
- Thin Lizzy (to Phonogram in 1974)
- Tommy Steele
- Them (to Tower Records in 1967)
- The Tornados
- Twinkle
- Unit 4 + 2
- Dickie Valentine (later on Pye Nixa)
- The Vernons Girls
- The Warriors
- David Whitfield
- Mark Wynter (later on Pye)
- Jimmy Young (formerly Polygon, later Columbia)
- The Zombies (CBS from 1967)

=== Pop/crossover artists ===
- AURORA
- Tori Amos
- Alexandra Burke
- Kerry Ellis
- Clay Aiken
- Bond
- Boyz II Men
- Jodie Brooke Wilson
- Amy MacDonald
- David Garrett
- Delta Goodrem
- The Love Willows
- Boz Scaggs
- David Sanborn
- Charlie Haden
- Brendan James
- Sonya Kitchell
- Najofondo
- Paula Cole
- Duel
- Matt Dusk
- Ludovico Einaudi
- Red Moon
- Rick Guard
- Louis Jordan
- Ute Lemper
- Annie Lennox
- Ashley MacIsaac
- Dominic Miller
- Morrissey
- Aziza Mustafa Zadeh
- Kristyna Myles
- Donny Osmond
- Ana Salazar
- Eimear Quinn
- Andrea Vanzo
- Vocal Sampling
- Russell Watson
- Hayley Westenra
- Imelda May
- Joe McElderry
- Kimberley Walsh

== See also ==
- List of one-hit wonders on the UK Singles Chart
