= Paul Silverthorne =

- Born: 1951 (age 74–75); Cheshire, England
- Genres: Classical, contemporary
- Occupations: Soloist, professor
- Instrument: Viola
- Member of: London Symphony Orchestra

Paul Silverthorne (born 1951 in Cheshire, England) is an English viola soloist and was principal violist of the London Symphony Orchestra 1990- 2015 and has been principal viola of the London Sinfonietta since 1988.

== Biography ==
Silverthorne studied at the Royal Academy of Music with Clarence Myerscough, Max Gilbert and Sidney Griller. In 1988, Silverthorne was made principal of the specialist contemporary music ensemble London Sinfonietta. In 1990, he started playing with the London Symphony Orchestra and appointed principal viola of the Orchestra the following year. In addition to his orchestral work, Paul Silverthorne is an active viola soloist and has performed with major English, American and European orchestras with conductors such as André Previn, Sir Colin Davis, Sir Simon Rattle, Sir John Eliot Gardiner and Kent Nagano.

Silverthorne is a specialist in contemporary music and has given many first performances both with the London Sinfonietta and in recitals. He has recorded for EMI, ASV, Chandos, Albany and Naxos.

Silverthorne is a professor of viola at the Royal Academy of Music (London), and plays a 17.7-inch (44.95 cm) 1620 Amati viola loaned from the Royal Academy of Music. Since 2015, Silverthorne has taught at the newly founded school of music in Soochow University, in Suzhou, China.
