= Royalton Kisch =

English conductor

Alastair Royalton-Kisch (20 January 1920 – 21 March 1995), known professionally as Royalton Kisch, was an orchestral conductor in London from 1947 to 1964. He performed regularly in the Royal Albert Hall and the Royal Festival Hall, as well as in other venues across Britain. He also appeared in international concerts in Italy, Greece, Israel, France and in Austria at the Salzburg Festival. His records appeared on the Decca label and he also performed on broadcasts for the BBC. He was forced to retire from the rostrum in 1964 due to a progressively worsening back.

== Biography ==
Alastair Royalton Kisch was born in Marylebone, London in 1920, the son of a solicitor, Ernest Royalton Kisch and Pamela Kisch, née Hart, although his date of birth is often wrongly given as 1919. His father was an early mentor of both Edward Heath and Arnold Goodman. Alastair Royalton Kisch was educated at Heath Mount School in Hampstead, before going on to Wellington College and finally Clare College, Cambridge. His university studies were interrupted by war service. The hyphen in his name was added at his father's instigation in 1938 by deed poll.

Inspired by a concert given by Sir Thomas Beecham and the London Philharmonic Orchestra at Wellington College, Royalton-Kisch decided to become a conductor, rather than follow the family tradition and go into the law. While at Wellington, he and his friend, Michael Heming, were very active musically, with Royalton-Kisch playing the clarinet, conducting the school orchestra and forming a madrigal group. At Cambridge University he was a student of E.J. Dent and elected President of the University Music Society. He was only the second undergraduate ever to conduct the Society's Orchestra, giving performances of Purcell's Dido and Aeneas at the Arts Theatre, Cambridge, in March 1940. He also received permission from Sir Henry Wood to attend the rehearsals and performances of the Promenade Concerts, held at the Queen's Hall, London.

His college years were interrupted by World War II, where between 1940–46 he served as a Signals Officer in the King's Royal Rifles (60th Rifles), being stationed in North Africa, Italy, and Greece. He later described the last eruption of Vesuvius to his friends. In 1944, he was carrying a message for his commanding officer from Salerno to Naples. His route took him close to eruption, along a road thick with soot and over which lava had begun to spill. Sick from the sulphurous stench and his lungs choked with soot, the atmosphere was so thick that navigation was very difficult. While in Italy, he organised 21 concerts as he followed the allied advance northward through Salerno, Naples, Rome, Florence, Bari, Ancona, Pesaro and Forli, before being transferred to Athens. In Rome, he was the first Englishman to conduct in the Rome Opera House.

While in Athens in 1945–46, he conducted concerts at the ancient Herodus Atticus Theatre and the Olympia Theatre. In February 1946, he conducted the National State Orchestra in Athens during a Festival of English Music under the patronage of the Minister for Education (G. Athanasios-Novas), the British Ambassador (Sir Reginald Leeper), and the British Council, represented by Sir Steven Runciman. These were the first concerts that many in the audience had heard since before the war. In 1946, he was released from the army, having attained the rank of captain.

Back in London in October 1946, Royalton-Kisch established himself among the younger generation of conductors. Helped by various supporters, including Runciman and Harold Holt, he regularly appeared at the Royal Albert Hall, where he made his central London debut on 30 March 1947. Aged 27, this made him the youngest conductor ever to appear there up to that time. Royalton-Kisch later appeared at the Royal Festival Hall, conducting many of the major London orchestras: the London Philharmonic Orchestra; the London Symphony Orchestra (LSO); the Philharmonia Orchestra; the Royal Philharmonic Orchestra (RPO); and regional orchestras including the Hallé and the City of Birmingham Symphony Orchestra, and abroad

Kisch's Albert Hall concert of 30 March 1947 (with Moura Lympany playing Beethoven's 4th Piano Concerto) led to his being offered a recording contract with Decca Records the following day. He became a regular feature of the British music scene, as well as performing numerous broadcasts for the BBC with the LSO, RPO and the Philharmonia Orchestra. His career with Decca included recordings with the LSO, the New Symphony Orchestra and the National Symphony Orchestra (see discography below). His repertory spanned the classical and romantic periods, with Brahms a special favourite, but twentieth-century music, including mainly British composers as well as Stravinsky and Honegger, was also covered. Reviewers looking back on his recordings have described his conducting as "musical, crisp and stylish" and "vigorous and suitably commanding, yet at the same time lyrical and sympathetic to the soloist".

After he retired from conducting, he unsuccessfully attempted to form a record company. Turning to art, he founded the Cork Street Gallery, specialising in British and French paintings, which he continued through most of the 1970s. A devoted family man, he also committed himself to charitable work, founding what is now the RK Charitable Trust with money earned from his musical career. He also supported research by Dr Leslie Bunt and his colleagues into the use of musical therapy for people with schizophrenia.

In 1940, Kisch married Aline, née Hylton Stewart, the cellist daughter of Bruce Hylton-Stewart and niece of Charles Hylton Stewart. They had two daughters and a son. He died in 1995, although his father's death in 1967 caused confusion when The Gramophone incorrectly published a premature obituary of the conductor.

== Discography ==
Composer	Work	Soloist	Orchestra	Rec date	Producer
Bellini	I Puritani: "Qui la Voce"	Erna Sack	National Symphony Orchestra	1949-05-31	John Culshaw
Bruch	Violin Concerto No 1	Alfredo Campoli	New Symphony Orchestra	1951-04-17	John Culshaw
Cimarosa	Il matrimonio segreto: Overture		London Symphony Orchestra	1951-04-18	John Culshaw
Cimarosa	Gli Orazi ed I Curiazi: Overture		London Symphony Orchestra	1951-04-18	John Culshaw
Delibes	Lakmé: "Où va la jeune indoue"	Erna Sack	New Symphony Orchestra	1949-05-29	John Culshaw
Donizetti	La Favorita: "Spirto gentil"	Eugene Conley	New Symphony Orchestra	1949-05-20	John Culshaw
Flotow	Martha: "M'appari"	Eugene Conley	New Symphony Orchestra	1949-05-20	John Culshaw
Gluck	Iphigénie en Aulide: Overture		London Symphony Orchestra	1951-04-18	John Culshaw
Gluck	Alceste: Overture		London Symphony Orchestra	1951-04-18	John Culshaw
Haydn	Symphony No 92 (Oxford)		National Symphony Orchestra	1947-09-03/4	Terence Gibbs (?)
Haydn	Symphony No 99		London Symphony Orchestra	1950-01-17	John Culshaw
Liszt	Piano Concerto No 1	Moura Lympany	National Symphony Orchestra	1947-09-02	Terence Gibbs
Mendelssohn	Rondo Brilliant in E flat	Moura Lympany	London Symphony Orchestra	1947-10-28	Victor Olof
Mozart	Symphony No 32, K318		National Symphony Orchestra	1947-10-29	Victor Olof (?)
Puccini	Tosca: "Recondita armonia"	Eugene Conley	New Symphony Orchestra	1949-05-27	John Culshaw
Puccini	Tosca: "E lucevan le stelle"	Eugene Conley	New Symphony Orchestra	1949-05-27	John Culshaw
Puccini	La Bohème: "Che gelida manina"	Eugene Conley	New Symphony Orchestra	1949-05-27	John Culshaw
Rossini	"La Danza"	Erna Sack	New Symphony Orchestra	1949-05-29	John Culshaw
Schumann	Piano Concerto	Moura Lympany	London Symphony Orchestra	1947-10-08	Victor Olof
Sinigaglia	La Baruffe Chiozotte: Overture		London Symphony Orchestra	1947-10-28	Victor Olof
Smetana	The Bartered Bride: Overture		London Symphony Orchestra	1950-01-18	John Culshaw
Verdi	Rigoletto: "Questa o quella"	Eugene Conley	New Symphony Orchestra	1949-05-20	John Culshaw
Verdi	Rigoletto: "La donna è mobile"	Eugene Conley	New Symphony Orchestra	1949-05-20	John Culshaw

The above were Decca recordings, made in Kingsway Hall, London, engineered by Kenneth Wilkinson. In March 2012, Classical Recordings Quarterly Editions produced a 2-CD set entitled "Homage to Royalton Kisch". The reissued recordings on the set are the Bruch, Schumann and Liszt concertos, the Cimarosa and Gluck overtures, Haydn's Symphony No 99 and the Donizetti, Flotow, Puccini and Verdi arias.

== Films ==
Royalton-Kisch was involved with two films, High Treason (1951, as conductor) and Folly to Be Wise (1953, as musical director). High Treason was scored by his contemporary at Wellington College, John Addison.
