= Percy Heming =

English operatic baritone singer and actor (1883–1956)

- Born: Percy Alfred Heming; 6 September 1883; Bristol, England
- Died: 11 January 1956 (aged 72); London, England
- Occupation: Baritone Singer
- Spouse: Joyce Savage

Percy Heming (6 September 1883 – 11 January 1956) was an English operatic baritone singer and actor. He was noted for his performance as Scarpia in Tosca but was also known for his comic parts and lighter operas.

Percy Alfred Heming was born in Bristol on 6 September 1883 and trained at the Royal Academy of Music. At first working in productions for Sir Thomas Beecham he then worked for the British National Opera Company. He spent his career in the theatre until 1946, when he became an artistic adviser at Covent Garden.

During the First World War he served in France with the Artists Rifles, at first as a corporal and then he was commissioned as a lieutenant.

Heming married Joyce Savage on 14 April 1914 at Douglas, Isle of Man. They had a son Michael Savage Heming who was a composer but he was killed in action at El Alamein in 1942. Heming died in hospital in London on 11 January 1956, aged 72.
