= Michael Heming =

British composer

Michael Savage Heming (14 January 1920 – 3 November 1942) was a British composer. He was the son of Percy Alfred Heming, a well-known baritone, and Joyce Savage. Educated at Wellington College in Berkshire, Heming went on to study conducting at the Royal Academy of Music, and was slated to become a student-assistant of John Barbirolli.

In 1942, while serving as a lieutenant in the King's Royal Rifle Corps, Heming was killed in action at the battle of El Alamein. Upon the return home of his personal effects, his mother discovered musical sketches Heming had written during and after his voyage to Africa. Percy Heming showed the sketches to Barbirolli, who engaged the composer and conductor Anthony Vincent Collins to edit the sketches into a work called Threnody for a Soldier Killed in Action.

The work was premiered at Sheffield City Hall, by the Hallé Orchestra conducted by Barbirolli, on 14 January 1944, which would have been Heming's 24th birthday. In 1945 Barbirolli recorded the piece on His Master's Voice with the Hallé Orchestra. Royalton Kisch, a schoolfriend at Wellington College who had also served in the same regiment as Heming, performed the piece many times in Italy and Athens in 1944–45, the first time being the performance on 12 December 1944 at the Teatro di San Carlo in Naples. The piece received many further performances over the next few years, although it has been largely forgotten since.
