= Jacqueline Blancard =

Jacqueline Blancard (6 April 1909 – 25 November 1994) was a French and Swiss classical pianist.

== Life ==
Born in Paris, Blancard, the daughter of two comedians, first studied at the Lausanne Conservatory then attended the Conservatoire de Paris. She later worked with Isidor Philipp and won a first prize in his class in 1926. Blancard pursued her training with Alfred Cortot, mastering both the German repertoire and the modern French school. She was highly regarded as a Schumann specialist and made an early recording of Debussy's two sets of Études. In 1938, she became the first pianist to make a recording of Ravel's Concerto for the Left Hand, under Charles Munch. She also performed three piano concertos by Mozart in New York.

She was married to Doctor Ami Miège from Geneva, Switzerland.

Blancard mainly recorded for the Decca Records label.

Blancard died in Geneva aged 85.
