= Peter Andry =

Peter Andry (standing) with, l. to r., Mstislav Rostropovich, Sviatoslav Richter, Herbert von Karajan, and David Oistrakh

Peter Edward Andry, OBE, OAM (10 March 1927 – 7 December 2010) was a classical record producer and an influential executive in the recording industry, active from the 1950s to the 1990s.

Born in Hamburg, Andry spent his formative years in Melbourne, Australia, where he became a professional flautist, with ambitions to be a conductor. After moving to England, where he studied with William Lloyd Webber and Sir Adrian Boult, he played the flute in the orchestra of a ballet company, with occasional chances to conduct. In 1953 he switched career, joining the Decca Record Company as a producer. Less than three years later he moved to Decca's rival, His Master's Voice, part of EMI, where he rose to become head of the group's classical operations.

After retiring from EMI in 1988, Andry headed a new classical label Warner Classics, before retiring finally from the recording industry in 1996.

== Life and career ==
=== Early years ===
Andry was born in Hamburg, the younger of two brothers. His mother was a professional opera singer, his father a lawyer. When Andry was eight the family moved to Australia, where he studied piano, composition and flute at the University of Melbourne. As a young and inexperienced supernumerary flautist he played under the baton of Otto Klemperer in a much-praised performance of Mahler's Second Symphony. After freelancing as a player, he joined the Australian Broadcasting Commission as a music producer, gaining knowledge of the technical side of studio recording.

In 1953 Andry won a British Council bursary, and moved to London to study with the composer William Lloyd Webber and work with the conductors Sir Adrian Boult and Walter Goehr. He played the flute in the orchestra of a touring dance company, the International Ballet, under the baton of a fellow Australian, James Walker, who arranged for him to conduct at some performances.

=== Decca ===
The ballet company disbanded within a year of Andry's joining. Walker took up an appointment as a recording producer with Decca Records, and on his recommendation, Andry was recruited to assist Decca's senior producer, Victor Olof. Andry joined the company in 1953 and his first sessions as a recording producer were with Peter Katin in a Liszt recital disc in March 1954. In the same year he worked with Gérard Souzay, Sir Adrian Boult, Wilhelm Kempff, Boyd Neel, Julius Katchen and Benjamin Britten. In July and August of that year he supervised the recording, seldom out of the catalogues since, of Edith Sitwell, Peter Pears and the English Opera Group ensemble conducted by Anthony Collins in Sitwell and Walton's Façade. Andry himself described this recording as "perhaps the most famous of Walton's popular entertainment."

During the rest of his time with Decca, Andry produced recordings by conductors including Georg Solti, Ernest Ansermet, Rafael Kubelík, Hans Knappertsbusch and Karl Böhm, instrumentalists including Karl Richter, Wilhelm Backhaus and the Vienna Octet, and singers including Giuseppe di Stefano, Lisa della Casa and Cesare Siepi. From 1955 Andry worked frequently in Vienna with Olof, who frequently supervised mono recordings while Andry took charge of the simultaneous stereo recordings. Andry admitted that from time to time he would have liked to leave the recording control room and take over from the conductor of the session. On at least one occasion he was able to do so, standing in for Solti at a patching session for a recording of Beethoven's Violin Concerto with the soloist Mischa Elman in April 1955.

In the days before John Culshaw persuaded Decca to record the Ring cycle in the studio, it was generally thought that the only practical way of putting Wagner's operas on disc was to tape live performances at the Bayreuth Festival. Culshaw himself disliked live recordings, and although his 1951 live Bayreuth Parsifal was hailed as "one of the great achievements in the history of the gramophone", he was glad to leave Andry to produce Decca's recordings at the 1955 festival. They were The Flying Dutchman and the Ring. The former was released at the time and was not well received. For contractual reasons, the Ring could not be released until 2006, when both the performance and recording received high praise.

=== EMI ===
In 1956, Olof left Decca to join its rival His Master's Voice to help rebuild its catalogue which was seriously depleted following the dissolution of His Master Voice's partnership with RCA Records. He swiftly recruited Andry to join him. His Master's Voice was one of the two major classical divisions of the EMI group, both functioning with a considerable degree of autonomy. The other division, Columbia, headed by Walter Legge, was not greatly affected by the split from RCA, as Legge had artists such as Klemperer, Carlo Maria Giulini, Elisabeth Schwarzkopf and Herbert von Karajan under contract. His Master's Voice still had stars such as Sir Thomas Beecham and Yehudi Menuhin on its roster, but artists from the RCA stable such as Arturo Toscanini, Arthur Rubinstein and Vladimir Horowitz whose recordings had previously been released in Britain on the His Master's Voice label were now unavailable to EMI.

After working successfully in the recording studio in the late 1950s and early 1960s, Andry was promoted to a senior executive position when the older generation of EMI executives retired. Legge left in 1964, and after the retirement of David Bicknell as manager of EMI's International Artistes Department, Andry succeeded to the post. He was later appointed head of EMI's International Classical Division, responsible not only for the group's international recording programme but for its worldwide classical marketing. In The Independent, Lewis Foreman wrote in 2010:

At EMI he was one of the major world figures of the classical recording industry during the great days of the major companies, and he worked with all the leading artists of the day, including such conductors as Bernstein, Giulini, Haitink, Jansons, Karajan, Kempe, Klemperer, Muti, Previn, Rattle and Tennstedt. It is invidious to mention singers and soloists for fear of omitting an illustrious name, but they included Barenboim, Caballé, Callas, Carreras, Domingo, du Pre, de los Ángeles, Nigel Kennedy, Michelangeli, Pavarotti, Perlman, Pollini, Rostropovich, Schwarzkopf and Kiri Te Kanawa.

Among Andry's most celebrated achievements was to persuade the Soviet authorities to allow David Oistrakh, Sviatoslav Richter and Mstislav Rostropovich to record Beethoven's Triple Concerto for EMI in 1969, and capping this by securing Karajan to conduct the Berlin Philharmonic for the recording. In The Gramophone, Edward Greenfield wrote, "Even in these days of star-studded casting on record, the line-up for this latest version of the Triple Concerto is nothing short of breathtaking". Forty years later, The Times said, "even today the performance still elicits superlatives."

=== Later years ===
In 1988, Andry left EMI to become president of Warner Classics. Among his notable productions was a recording of Henryk Gorecki's Symphony No.3. That record became one of the biggest selling albums of classical music in the 1990s. Another populist success was the second Three Tenors album, with Pavarotti, Carreras and Domingo, which Andry arranged to record live in Los Angeles in July 1994 at the time of a FIFA World Cup competition, and rush-released within six weeks.

Andry retired from the record business in 1996. In 2008 he published a volume of memoirs, Inside the Recording Studio – Working with Callas, Rostropovich, Domingo, and the Classical Élite.

Andry died of cancer in St John's Hospice in St John's Wood, London, at the age of 83.

== Personal life and honours ==
Andry 's first marriage, to Rosemary Macklin, was dissolved and in 1965 he married Christine Sunderland. There were two sons from the first marriage and a daughter from the second.

Andry was known for his charity work. Among the causes he worked for were the Music Therapy Charity and the Australian Music Foundation in London. He served on musical councils and bodies including those of the Royal Philharmonic Society and the Royal Society of Arts. For his fund-raising work on behalf of the Royal College of Music he was awarded an honorary Fellowship of the college. Other awards were an honorary Doctorate from the City University, London in 1990, the Medal of the Order of Australia in 1997 and the OBE in 2004.
