= James Walker (conductor) =

Australian conductor (1912–1988)

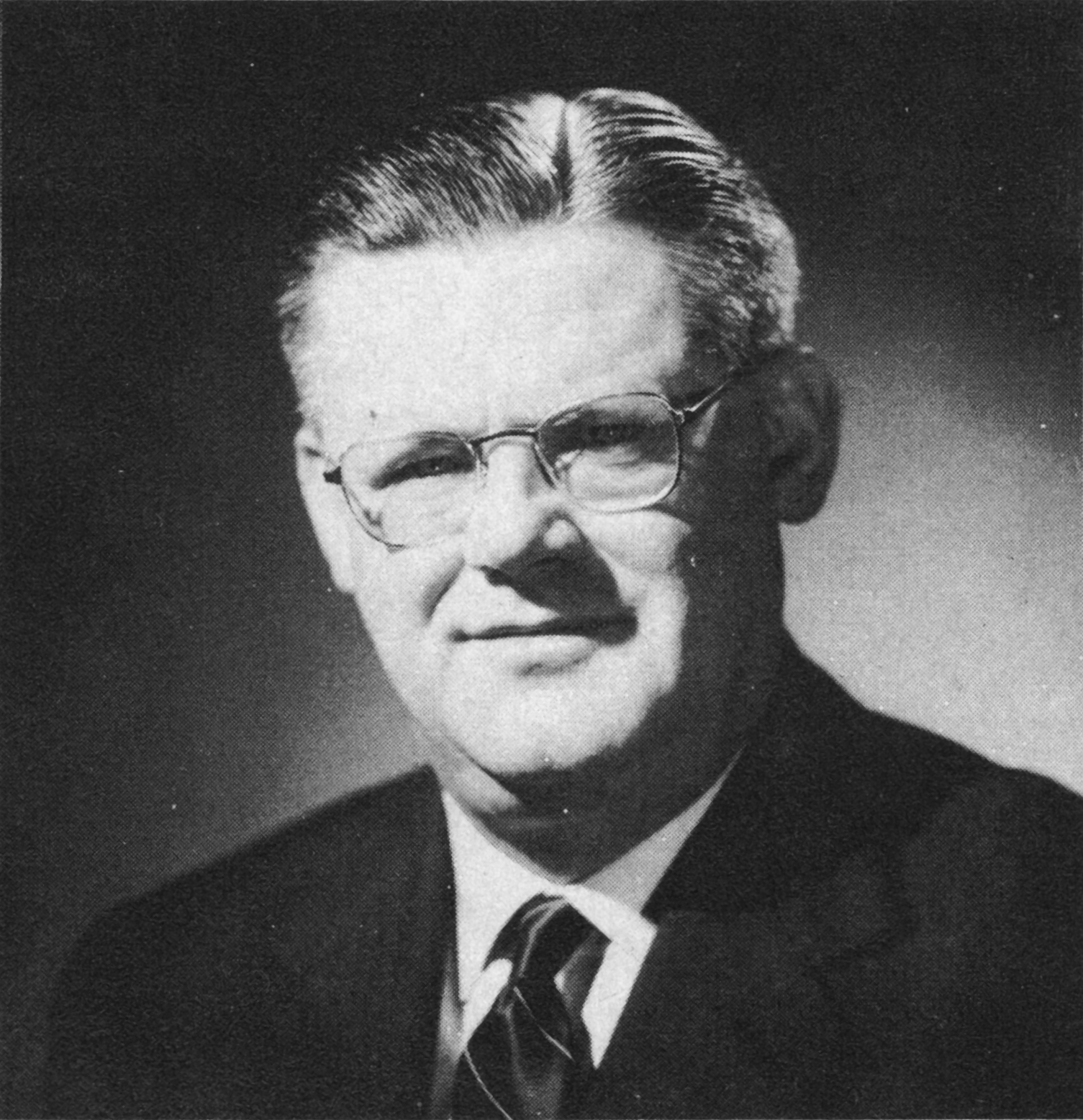
Walker, circa 1962

James Walker (9 April 1912 – 20 August 1988) was an Australian musician known both as a conductor of ballet and opera and as a recording producer supervising classical recording sessions.

As a conductor Walker was musical director of the International Ballet company from 1947 to 1953 and of the D'Oyly Carte Opera Company from 1968 to 1971 in succession to Isidore Godfrey. For D'Oyly Carte he supervised and sometimes conducted recordings from the 1950s to the 1970s.

Before and after his years with D'Oyly Carte Walker was a producer for Decca Records, working with a large number of international artists including Benjamin Britten, Pierre Monteux, Renata Tebaldi, Herbert von Karajan and Vladimir Ashkenazy. Many of the 1950s and 1960s recordings produced by Walker have been transferred to CD and remain in the catalogues.

== Biography ==
=== Early years ===
Walker was born in Ashfield, New South Wales. His musical talent became clear at an early age; when he was seven The Sydney Morning Herald printed an article headed "Child Wonder at Ashfield" reporting on a recital at which he performed on piano, organ and violin. He was educated at the Sydney Conservatorium of Music and then at the Royal Academy of Music in London where some of his compositions were given public performances. At an Academy concert he played a movement of Rachmaninov's Third Piano Concerto under the baton of Sir Henry Wood, and was judged by The Musical Times to show great promise. By 1935, towards the end of his studies at the Academy, he had received three commendations for his piano performances and one for his quick study.

After leaving the Academy Walker worked as assistant to Ernest Irving, the musical director of Ealing Studios. In that capacity he supervised or conducted recording sessions, working with leading British composers including Ralph Vaughan Williams. During the Second World War Walker served in the Royal Naval Volunteer Reserve.

In the Christmas season of 1945–46 Walker made his professional London debut as conductor of The Glass Slipper "A Pantomime with Music Ballet and Harlequinade" by Herbert and Eleanor Farjeon at the St James's Theatre. In 1947 he was appointed musical director of the International Ballet company which played in London and on tour in Britain and continental Europe. Although ballet critics rarely mention conductors the critic in The Manchester Guardian singled Walker out for praise: "The timing of the orchestra under James Walker has also a large share in the pace and poise of the spectacle." Walker remained with the International Ballet until it disbanded in 1953. In the later days of the company Walker gave the young flautist Peter Andry the chance to conduct and later encouraged him to pursue a career as a record producer.

=== Decca and D'Oyly Carte ===
In January 1953 Walker first worked as a recording producer for Decca Records supervising a set of Mozart violin sonatas that has long vanished from the catalogues. Within the year he was working alongside John Culshaw on Sir Adrian Boult's Vaughan Williams symphony cycle. These recordings have been reissued on CD as have many other mono Decca recordings produced by Walker, including Holst's The Planets conducted by Sir Malcolm Sargent, Alfredo Campoli's recording of Elgar's Violin Concerto and Britten's Les Illuminations sung by Peter Pears. Walker was co-producer of Decca's 1954 Vienna recording of Der Rosenkavalier conducted by Erich Kleiber, which has remained in the catalogues since its first issue.

In 1954 Walker produced Decca's first stereophonic recordings; they were of Russian works recorded in Geneva with the Suisse Romande Orchestra conducted by Ernest Ansermet. Walker was Decca's principal producer in Geneva for the rest of the 1950s. He also supervised sessions in Rome of operatic recordings starring Renata Tebaldi. Many of Walker's stereo recordings from the late 1950s have been reissued on CD, including Britten's A Midsummer Night's Dream conducted by the composer, Elgar's Enigma Variations conducted by Pierre Monteux (1958), Sir Thomas Beecham's extravagantly rescored Messiah (1959), and Boult's more scholarly recording of the same work (1961). With Culshaw, Walker produced Herbert von Karajan's 1959 recording of Aida featuring Tebaldi and Carlo Bergonzi.

Walker produced a series of Decca recordings of the Gilbert and Sullivan operas performed by the D'Oyly Carte Opera Company. These were Princess Ida in 1954, The Pirates of Penzance and The Mikado in 1957, H.M.S. Pinafore in 1959, Iolanthe and The Gondoliers in 1960, and Cox and Box and Patience in 1961. All these sets were conducted by the D'Oyly Carte company's long-serving musical director Isidore Godfrey. In 1961 Walker accepted Bridget D'Oyly Carte's invitation to leave Decca to become Godfrey's deputy musical director. He served in that capacity until Godfrey's retirement in 1968, when Walker took over as musical director. As one historian of the D'Oyly Carte company noted, "Godfrey left on a huge tide of affection and regret – and he was a hard act to follow". Walker nevertheless attracted good notices from the critics: "a fine degree of precision without any loss of spontaneity", although Walker was judged "less of a disciplinarian than Isidore Godfrey."

While with D'Oyly Carte Walker continued to produce some of the company's Decca recordings. During the same period as a conductor he directed a series of popular classical pieces recorded by Decca crews for Reader's Digest's record label in 1962. This was followed in 1963 by a three disc set of excerpts from the Savoy operas also for Reader's Digest with D'Oyly Carte principals singing for contractual reasons roles that they did not normally sing on stage. These recordings were produced by Charles Gerhardt. In 1964 Walker conducted the D'Oyly Carte company and the Royal Philharmonic Orchestra in a soundtrack recording for an animated film of Ruddigore by Halas and Batchelor. In the same year Walker married Angela Lang a member of the D'Oyly Carte company's office staff.

After he became musical director of the D'Oyly Carte company Walker conducted a disc of 21 choruses from the Savoy operas (1969) and another of excerpts from the operas (1970), both of which he also produced. In 1971 he conducted a complete H.M.S. Pinafore for Decca but he was not the recording producer, and the close dry sound and prominent sound effects favoured by the new producer caused the set to be called "the most detested D'Oyly Carte recording of all time" and "an artistic disaster".

=== Later years ===
In 1971 Walker resigned from the D'Oyly Carte company and returned to Decca, where for a time he concentrated on recordings of modern music, working with Pierre Boulez and others. He also produced many recordings of English music made by Decca on behalf of the independent Lyrita label. Among his 1970s recordings for the main Decca label were a large number of solo piano recordings with Vladimir Ashkenazy, and the complete Haydn piano sonatas played by John McCabe. When the D'Oyly Carte company under Walker's successor Royston Nash recorded for Decca in the 1970s Walker was not the producer, and the recorded sound was generally judged inferior to that obtained by Walker and his colleagues in the 1950s and 1960s. Walker's last recording sessions for Decca were in February 1985 with Ashkenazy in piano music by Chopin.

Walker died in Surrey aged 76.
