= Victor Olof =

British musician and record producer

Olof (left) with Sir Thomas Beecham at an His Master's Voice recording session

Victor Olof (born Victor Olof Ahlquist; 12 July 1898 – 3 November 1974) was an English musician, known first as a violinist and conductor and later as a record producer for Decca Records and subsequently for His Master's Voice.

Among the artists whose recordings Olof supervised were Karl Böhm, Erich Kleiber, Carl Schuricht, Sir Thomas Beecham, Lisa della Casa, Cesare Siepi, Victoria de los Ángeles, Clifford Curzon, Wilhelm Backhaus and Yehudi Menuhin.

== Life and career ==
=== Early years ===
Victor Olof Ahlquist was of Swedish descent. He was born in St Pancras, London, the youngest of five children of Michael Ahlqist, a tailor who retained his Swedish nationality, and his wife Elizabeth. He attended the Guildhall School of Music in London, where he won the Melba Scholarship in 1916. His violin professor was Kalman Ronay. Among his fellow students were the singers Dora Labbette and Lilian Stiles-Allen. On the advice of the principal of the school, Sir Landon Ronald, he dropped his original surname.

In the 1920s, Olof founded and led the Victor Olof Sextet, with whom he gave concerts and broadcasts for more than 20 years. In January 1923 he gave a recital in Vienna which included an arrangement for violin and piano of the Elgar Violin Concerto. In 1928 he married Phyllis Robey; there were two sons of the marriage. In the 1940s he was an orchestral manager and conductor, working with the London Symphony Orchestra and especially the National Symphony Orchestra, an ad hoc ensemble of top orchestral players assembled for the wealthy musical amateur Sidney Beer.

=== Decca ===
At a recording session, Arthur Haddy, chief recording engineer of the Decca Record Company, spotted Olof's acute ear for orchestral balance. He recommended to the head of Decca, Edward Lewis, that Olof should be invited to join the company to produce some of the many recordings planned for the expansion of its classical catalogue. Decca had developed a revolutionary new recording technique known as "ffrr" (full frequency range recording) which put the company far ahead of its rivals in the realism of sound on its discs.

Olof's first sessions as producer were with Decca's renowned engineer Kenneth Wilkinson, recording Eileen Joyce with Beer and his orchestra in music by Grieg, Debussy and Delius in June 1944. In between supervising sessions of music by composers from Eric Coates to Richard Wagner, Olof conducted some recordings for Decca, mainly of overtures and other short orchestral pieces.

At the end of the war, Lewis authorised the expansion of Decca's classical programme to make it international, with recordings in Paris, Amsterdam, Zurich, Geneva, Bayreuth and Vienna. The Decca producer John Culshaw wrote, "Within five years of the end of the war Decca was well and truly in the big league." Olof was in the thick of this international programme, supervising sessions in all six locations with the exception of Bayreuth (according to Culshaw, Olof did not much like Wagner's music). Among the recordings produced by Olof that have seldom been out of the catalogues are Das Lied von der Erde with Bruno Walter and Kathleen Ferrier, and a series of Mozart operas made in 1955 with the Vienna Philharmonic Orchestra and singers mostly from the Vienna State Opera. At that time, Olof was little interested in stereophonic recordings; he supervised the mono recordings with one of Decca's senior engineers, while his assistant, Peter Andry, and a junior engineer made simultaneous stereo recordings of the same sessions. Among those whose recordings Olof supervised for Decca were Josef Krips, Karl Böhm, Erich Kleiber, Carl Schuricht, Lisa della Casa, Cesare Siepi, Wilhelm Backhaus and Clifford Curzon.

=== His Master's Voice ===
At EMI, Olof took over from Lawrance Collingwood as producer of Sir Thomas Beecham's recordings. He knew Beecham well, having played an important role in assembling the Royal Philharmonic Orchestra for the conductor in 1946. Having had substantial influence over the choice of repertoire at Decca, Olof was more constrained at EMI, where he was subordinate to the head of the company's International Artistes Department, David Bicknell. The latter, Fred Gaisberg's successor, was responsible for decisions about the artists and repertoire recorded by EMI, and was more inclined than Olof to go along with Beecham's choice of repertoire.

Olof's assistant, Peter Andry, wrote in an obituary tribute:

He found his new role, within the larger EMI organisation, demanded a different approach. Less autocratic by now, he became the teacher and guide to many people who had hitherto been in the Company's outposts. He is fondly remembered by the staff of Pathè Marconi where he set new standards of technical perfection, not previously achieved, and which are still practised to this day.

Among the EMI recordings produced by Olof are Beecham's set of Carmen, Rudolf Kempe's set of Lohengrin, and all but one act of André Cluytens' set of The Tales of Hoffmann (the Giulietta act was produced, at Elisabeth Schwarzkopf's insistence, by her husband, Walter Legge). Among the other artists whose performances Olof recorded for EMI were Sir Malcolm Sargent, Sir John Barbirolli and Yehudi Menuhin. He retired from EMI in 1963, but returned to the studios from retirement, his last recording being made when he was 70.

=== Later years ===
In 1969, Olof was appointed as a member of the Arts Council committee of inquiry into orchestral resources in Britain under the chairmanship of Sir Alan Peacock.

In retirement, Olof lived at Milford on Sea on the south coast of England. He died at the age of 76.
