= Sidney Griller =

English violinist (1911 - 1993)

Sidney Griller CBE (10 January 1911 – 20 November 1993) was an English violinist. He was leader of the Griller Quartet from 1928 to 1963, and a teacher of chamber music at the Royal Academy of Music.

== Life ==
Griller was born in 1911; his parents, Salter Griller and Hannah Green, were Jewish immigrants, with a shop in the East End of London. Aged 13, he won a scholarship to the Royal Academy of Music. While at the Royal Academy of Music, Griller was a winner of the Dove Scholarship (1925), a Gowland Harrison scholar (1928 & 1929), a prizeholder of the Sir Edward Cooper Prize (1927 & 1928) and a winner of the Alfred J. Waley Prize (1928). He graduated in 1929 with the Academy’s Certificate of Merit, its highest award.

In 1928, whilst a student at the RAM he founded the Griller Quartet, coached initially by the viola player Lionel Tertis. By 1931 the quartet established a reputation in Europe. In January 1931 they made a debut in New York City Hall, and subsequently obtained a contract with NBC. The quartet played classics and contemporary works, and made recordings. In 1932 Griller married Honor Linton; they had a son and daughter.

During the Second World War the quartet gave many concerts for the RAF. In 1949 they became resident quartet at University of California at Berkeley. In 1945 he was made a Fellow of the Royal Academy of Music (FRAM).

Griller was appointed CBE in 1951. In 1953 he was selected by Sir Adrian Boult to play in the orchestra for the Coronation of Elizabeth II.

The Griller quartet disbanded in 1963; in 1964 he returned to the Royal Academy of Music, teaching chamber music, and his classes began the careers of a number of successful string quartets including the Alberni Quartet, the Coull Quartet, the Fitzwilliam Quartet and the Lindsay Quartet. He also gave chamber music classes at the Yehudi Menuhin School. In 1981 at the University of York he received an honorary doctorate from the Fitzwilliam Quartet, the resident quartet there.

After retirement from the Royal Academy of Music in 1986, he gave masterclasses at the Royal Northern College of Music, and sat on juries of international competitions. Griller died in London in 1993, aged 82.
