= Griller Quartet =

British string quartet (active 1931 - 1963)

The Griller String Quartet was a British musical ensemble particularly active from 1931 to c.1961 or 1963, when it was disbanded. The quartet was in residence at the University of California at Berkeley from 1949 to 1961. It performed a wide repertory, including works written for it by Ernest Bloch, Darius Milhaud, and Arnold Bax.

== Personnel ==
The personnel included:

1st violin: Sidney Griller
2nd violin:Jack O'Brien
viola: Philip Burton
violoncello: Colin Hampton

== Origins ==
Among the Quartet's first recordings was that of the oboe quintet written by Elizabeth Maconchy (a pupil of Ralph Vaughan Williams), a work which was a prize winner in the London Daily Telegraph Chamber Music Competition of 1933. They performed at Gloucester Cathedral in the Three Choirs Festival in September 1934. The Quartet gave the premiere of the Arnold Cooke first string quartet in 1935. In 1944 they performed the Arnold Bax quartet no 1 in G major at the Duke's Hall in a special concert with Clifford Curzon, on behalf of Sir Henry J. Wood. In performance they were sometimes joined by William Primrose, Max Gilbert or Denis Matthews.

== Recordings ==
The Griller Quartet recorded extensively for Decca Records in the later 78 rpm and early LP era. Some examples of their recorded art are as follows:

- Arnold Bax: Nonet (with Goossens, Thurston and Korchinska) (Columbia CAX 7922-25, 1937)
- Beethoven: Quartet op. 95 in F minor. (Decca lx 3026 and (78) AK 2185-7). (Before 1950)
- Beethoven: Quartet op. 132 in A minor. (Decca LP LXT 2573). (Before 1953)
- Bliss: Quartet no 2 in F minor (1950). (Decca lx 3038). (Before 1953)
- Bliss: Quintet for clarinet and strings, with Frederick Thurston. (Decca K 780-3). (1935)
- Bloch: Quartets no 1,2,3,4. (Decca LP LXT 5071, 5072, 5073). (EMG review Dec 1955)
- Edric Cundell: String Quartet in C, op. 27
- Dvořák: Quartet no 6 in F major, op. 96. (Decca LP LXT 2530). (Before 1950)
- Cecil Armstrong Gibbs: String Quartet in A major, op. 73
- Haydn: The Seven Last Words from the Cross (with Max Gilbert). (Decca 78 rpm, 17 sides, AK 2139-2147). (Before 1950)
- Haydn: Quartet op. 3 no 5 in F major. (Decca LX 3087). (Before 1953)
- Haydn: Quartets op. 74 nos. 1-3 (recorded at Hertz Hall, Berkeley) (LP VSD-2033, 2034-B, and as Vanguard/Bach Guild HM-42 SD).
- Maconchy: Quintet for oboe and strings, with Helen Gaskel (His Master's Voice 78 rpm, B 4448-9). (Before 1936)
- Mozart: Quartet in B flat major, K 159. (Decca lx 3087). (Before 1953)
- Mozart: Quartet in C major K 465. (Decca 78 rpm, 7 sides, AK 2049-2052). (Before 1950)
- Mozart: Quintet in G minor K 516 (with Max Gilbert). (Decca LP LXT 2515 & 78 rpm AX 343-346). (15-16 Nov 1948, West Hampstead Studios)
- Mozart: Quintet in C minor, K 406 (with William Primrose). (Top Rank LP XRK 504/ Fontana BIG 430-Y/ Vanguard/Bach Guild HM-29 SD). (EMG review June 1959)
- Mozart: Quintet in G minor, K 516 (with William Primrose). (Top Rank LP XRK 504/ Fontana BIG 430-Y/ Vanguard/Bach Guild HM-29 SD). (EMG review June 1959)
- Mozart: Quartet in d minor, K.421
- Mozart: Quartet in F major, K 168. (Decca LP LXT 2728). (Before 1953)
- Mozart: Quartet in B flat, major K 458 'Hunt'. (Decca LP LXT 2728). (Before 1953)
- Mozart: Adagio and Fugue in C minor, K 546. (Decca LP LXT 2530). (Before 1953)
- Purcell: Four-part Fantasia No 3 (arr Warlock). (Decca 78 rpm, 1 side, AK 2049-52 side filler). (Before 1950)
- Rubbra: Quartet no 2 E flat major op. 73. (Decca lx 3088). (Before 1953)
- Sibelius: Quartet in D minor op. 56, Voces intimae. (Decca LP LXT 2575). (Before 1953)

For a virtually complete list, see DECCA CLASSICAL, 1929-2009.

== Sources ==
- Decca Supplementary catalogue of 78rpm and 33rpm Long-playing Records April 1949 to September, 1950 (London 1950).
- E. Sackville-West and D. Shawe-Taylor, The Record Year 2 (Collins, London 1953).
- E.M.G., The Art of Record Buying 1960 (London 1960).
- Fontana BIG 430-Y, sleevenotes (for list of personnel).
- Nicholas P. Lafkas, 'Quartet In Residence', California Monthly LXI, No. 3, (November 1950), pp. 22–23, 43-44.
