= Max Gilbert =

British violist (1912 - 1993)

- Born: Gilbert Smith; 5 July 1912; Leicester, England
- Died: 28 September 1993 (aged 81) Ruislip, London
- Genres: Classical
- Occupations: Musician, Professor
- Instruments: Violin, Viola

Max Gilbert (July 5, 1912 – September 28, 1993), was a British violist from Leicester. He played with the London Symphony Orchestra and the Boyd Neel Orchestra. He was a pupil of Lionel Tertis, and performed with many ensembles including the Griller String Quartet and the International String Quartet. He was a professor of viola at the Royal Academy of Music.

== Biography ==
Max Gilbert, born Gilbert Smith, was born in Oadby, Leicestershire, on 5 July 1912 to Albert Edward Smith, a schoolmaster, and his wife Ada Florence Heatley. His mother played the piano, and Gilbert learned the violin, viola and piano. Gilbert attended the Wyggeston Grammar School for Boys in Leicester. Whilst at Wyggeston, Gilbert (then Gilbert Smith) played violin with the Wyggeston Trio, with Haydn Hopkins (cello) and L.D. Ford (piano), and broadcast on the BBC from Nottingham in May 1928.

In 1929, he was awarded an Associated Board Exhibitioner scholarship to study at the Royal Academy of Music in London, where he studied violin and later viola, with Rowsby Woof. Gilbert later took lessons with Lionel Tertis and William Primrose. He received his Bronze Medal (Violin) from the RAM in 1930 and the Silver Medal (Violin) in 1931.

Gilbert's scholarship entry cites his name as Gilbert Smith. However, after his 19th birthday in 1931, his name is listed in all subsequent concert performances as Max Gilbert.

Gilbert won several awards and prizes whilst a student at the RAM. In 1931 and 1933 he was awarded the Sir Edward Cooper Quartet Prize. In 1933 he won the Marguerite Elzy Withers Memorial Prize. Also in 1933, he received the Manns Memorial Prize - a prize founded by public subscription in 1909, in memory of August Manns, the conductor and composer. In 1934 he was awarded the Leslie Alexander Gift and the R.A.M. Club Prize. In 1932 he received the Certificate of Merit on the violin, and in 1933 the Certificate of Merit with Distinction on the viola.

At a chamber concert given at the Royal Academy of Music in November 1931, Gilbert performed the recently discovered (at the RAM library) Haydn String Quartet in E flat, Opus 1 No.1., with Frederick Grinke (violin), David Martin (violin) and Florence Hooton (cello).

In 1934 Gilbert became the principal violist of the London Symphony Orchestra and performed with them for eleven years. During the war, he played with the RAF Symphony Orchestra. The other violists in the viola section included Watson Forbes, Keith Cummings and Philip Burton. He was also the principal violist of the Boyd Neel Orchestra with whom he played until 1952. In 1939 with the Boyd Neel Orchestra, Gilbert recorded Howells' Elegy for Viola, String Quartet and String Orchestra.

Gilbert married Barbara Mary Lake, the assistant secretary of the Boyd Neel Orchestra, in 1946. The Orchestra went on a tour of Australia in 1947. The orchestra had a tour repertoire of over fifty works and gave over seventy concerts. They performed in Sydney, Melbourne, Ballarat, Bendigo, Griffith, Wagga Wagga, Adelaide and Canberra. They then travelled to New Zealand and gave concerts in Auckland, Wellington and Christchurch. Gilbert stayed on after the tour to give further recitals. Gilbert received much praise from the critics there; one reporting that, at a performance of Mozart's Sinfonia Concertante, "the broad resonance of Max Gilbert's viola made this performance unforgettable." From the critic Neville Cardus, of the same work: "Mr Grinke's violin and Mr Gilbert's viola sang and floated and interchanged as heavenly twins of music. The velvet of Mr. Gilbert's viola was a delight not experienced by the present writer during some seven years of habitual attendance at concerts." Gilbert received further praise at a concert in Melbourne in May 1947. The critic wrote: "Max Gilbert's viola playing poured forth some of the most exquisite tones Melbourne has ever heard from this instrument."Whilst on tour in Australia, Gilbert broadcast as soloist with the ABC's Melbourne Symphony Orchestra, conducted by Percy Code, in a performance of Berlioz's Harold in Italy.

He then joined the Philharmonia Orchestra and played under conductors such as Furtwängler, Giulini, Karajan and Susskind, with whom he featured as the viola soloist in a recording of the Italian Serenade by Hugo Wolf.

Gilbert was a prolific chamber music player and played with numerous ensembles, including the Griller String Quartet, with whom he recorded the Mozart String Quintet in G Minor; the International String Quartet with Andre Mangeot (violin), Walter Price (violin) and Bernard Richards (viola), with whom he performed at the Wigmore Hall in London in 1937; the Philharmonic String Trio with David Martin (violin) and James Whitehead (cello); The Philharmonic Harp Trio with Geoffrey Gilbert (flute) and Maria Korchinska (harp); the Lyra Quartet with Gordon Walker (flute), George Stratton (violin) and Marie Goossens (harp);the Willoughby String Quartet with Louis Willoughby (violin), Clayton Hare (violin) and Peter Beaven (cello); the Philharmonic Ensemble; the Aleph String Quartet with Alan Loveday (violin), Reginald Morley (violin) and Harvey Phillips (cello); the Martin String Quartet with David Martin (violin), Neville Marriner (violin), Eileen Grainger (viola) and Bernard Richards (cello);the Virtuoso String Quartet with Marjorie Hayward (violin), Edwin Virgo (violin) and Cedric Sharpe (cello); the Hirsch String Quartet, with whom he recorded the Dvorak Piano Quintet in A with Louis Kentner, and the Dutch String Quartet, Nap de Klijn (violin), Johan van Helder (violin), Paul Godwin (viola), Carel Boomkamp (cello), with whom he performed alongside Dennis Brain and Gerald Moore at Goldsmiths' Hall in London in 1952.

He recorded and performed with a number of other leading artists of the period, including Kendall Taylor, and Gwendolen Mason.

Between 1945 and 1950, for the BBC's Music in Miniature Series, Gilbert performed and broadcast with Lev Pouishnoff, Harriet Cohen, Leon Goossens, Isobel Baillie, Dinu Lipatti, Suzanne Danco, Webster Booth, Julius Isserlis and Pierre Fournier.

He also recorded two songs for Contralto with Viola Obbligato by Brahms, Gestillte Sehnsucht, Op. 91, No. 1 and Gestillte Wiegenlied, Op. 91, No. 2, with Kathleen Ferrier, having recorded it some ten years earlier with Nancy Evans.

In 1950, Gilbert performed with the BBC Midland Light Orchestra in a broadcast of Alessandro Scarlatti's Viola Concerto. In that same year he performed with the BBC Welsh Orchestra, conducted by Mansel Thomas in a broadcast performance of Handel's Viola Concerto in B Minor and Holst's Lyric Movement for Viola and Orchestra.

In 1957, Gilbert formed the English Chamber Music Players along with Henry Bronkhurst (violin), Hugh Bean (violin) and Derek Simpson (cello), giving their first public recital at the Hampstead Music Club in February of that year.

In 1948, Gilbert replaced Bernard Shore at the Royal Academy of Music as Professor of Viola. He retired in 1984 and in his memory the Royal Academy of Music instituted the Max Gilbert Viola Solo Prize for a performance of a Max Reger Suite.

For much of his playing career, Gilbert played on a Tertis Model viola made by Arthur Richardson, a luthier from Crediton in Devon.

Gilbert died in Ruislip, London, in 1993 at the age of 81.

== References and sources ==
=== Sources ===
==== Books ====
- Riley, Maurice W. (1980). The History of the Viola. Michigan, U.S.A: Braun-Brumfield, Ann Arbor. p. 241. ISBN 0960315004.
- Tertis, Lionel (1974). My Viola and I. Elek Books, London. p. 138. ISBN 0236310402.
- Townend, Peter (1962). Who's Who in Music. London: Burke’s Peerage Ltd. p. 67.
- White, John (1997). An Anthology of British Viola Players. Colne, Lancashire: Comus Edition. pp. 91, 92. ISBN 095310690X.
- White, John (2006). Lionel Tertis – The First Great Virtuoso of the Viola. The Boydell Press. p. 250. ISBN 9781843832782.
