= London Symphony Orchestra =

British symphony orchestra

- Orchestra
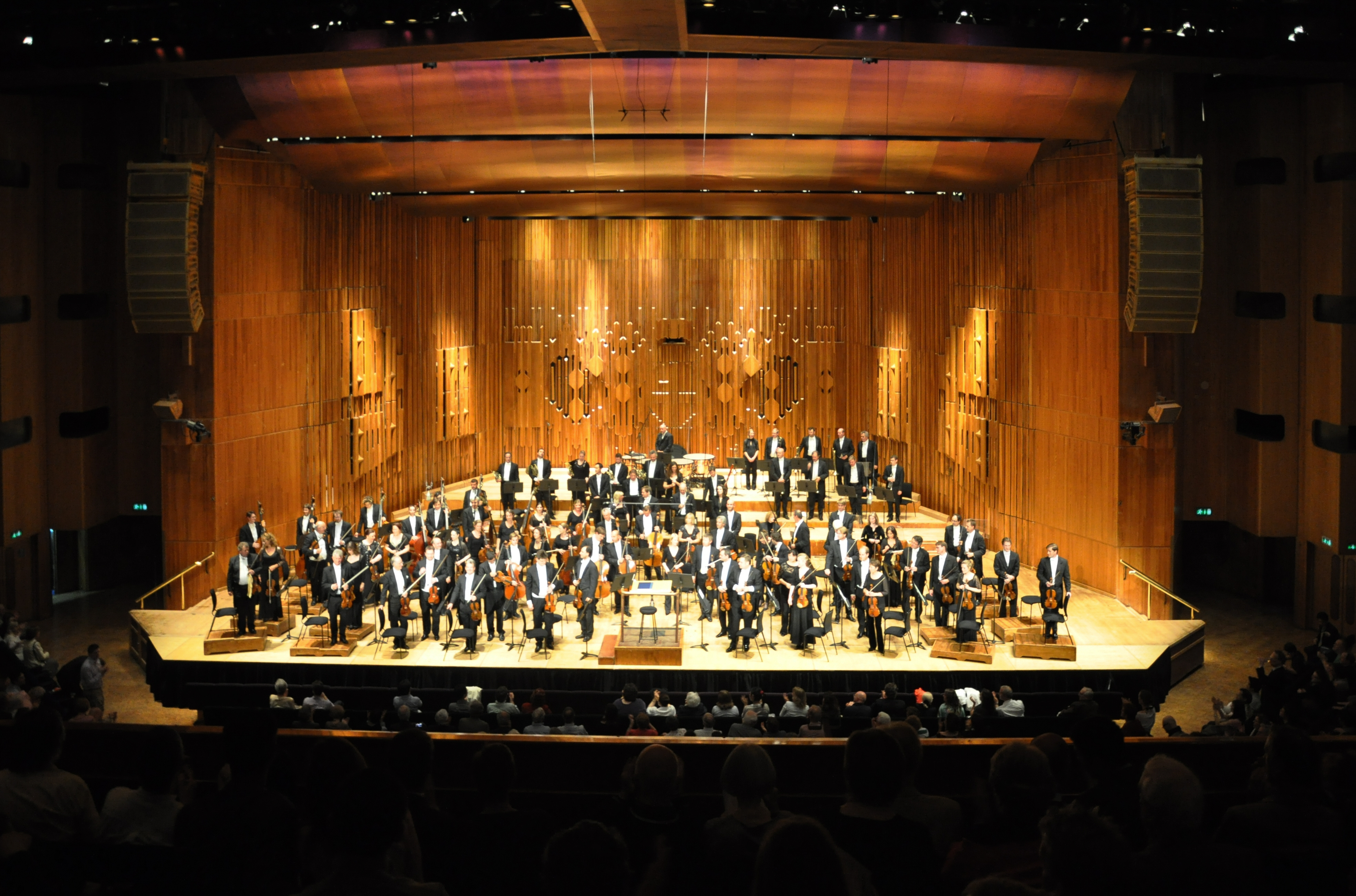
- The London Symphony Orchestra at the Barbican
- Founded: 1904
- Concert hall: Barbican Centre
- Principal conductor: Sir Antonio Pappano
- Website: www.lso.co.uk

The London Symphony Orchestra (LSO) is a British ensemble based in London. Founded in 1904, the LSO is the oldest of London's symphony orchestras. It was created by a group of players who left Henry Wood's Queen's Hall Orchestra because of a new rule requiring players to give the orchestra their exclusive services. The LSO itself later introduced a similar rule for its members. From the outset the LSO was organised on co-operative lines, with all players sharing the profits at the end of each season. This practice continued for the orchestra's first four decades.

The LSO underwent periods of eclipse in the 1930s and 1950s when it was regarded as inferior in quality to new London orchestras, to which it lost players and bookings: the BBC Symphony Orchestra and the London Philharmonic Orchestra in the 1930s and the Philharmonia and Royal Philharmonic after the Second World War. The profit-sharing principle was abandoned in the post-war era as a condition of receiving public subsidy for the first time. In the 1950s the orchestra debated whether to concentrate on film work at the expense of symphony concerts; many senior players left when the majority of players rejected the idea.

By the 1960s the LSO had recovered its leading position, which it has retained subsequently. In 1966, to perform alongside it in choral works, the orchestra established the LSO Chorus, originally a mix of professional and amateur singers, later a wholly amateur ensemble. As a self-governing body, the orchestra selects the conductors with whom it works. At some stages in its history it has dispensed with a principal conductor and worked only with guests. Among conductors with whom it is most associated are, in its early days, Hans Richter, Sir Edward Elgar, and Sir Thomas Beecham, and in more recent decades Pierre Monteux, André Previn, Claudio Abbado, Sir Colin Davis, Valery Gergiev and Sir Simon Rattle. Its current chief conductor is Sir Antonio Pappano.

Since 1982 the LSO has been based in the Barbican Centre in the City of London. Among its programmes there have been large-scale festivals celebrating composers as diverse as Berlioz, Mahler and Leonard Bernstein. The LSO claims to be the world's most recorded orchestra; it has made gramophone recordings since 1912 and has played on more than 200 soundtrack recordings for the cinema, of which the best known include the Star Wars series.

== History ==
=== Background ===
At the turn of the twentieth century London did not have permanent salaried orchestras. The main music venues: Covent Garden, the Philharmonic Society and the Queen's Hall had their players engaged for the concert or season.

At the time it was also an accepted practice for players to break their contracts for better-paid engagements, and then engage another player to deputise at the concert (and the rehearsals before). The treasurer of the Philharmonic Society, John Mewburn Levien, described the system thus: "A, whom you want, signs to play at your concert. He sends B (whom you don't mind) to the first rehearsal. B, without your knowledge or consent, sends C to the second rehearsal. Not being able to play at the concert, C sends D, whom you would have paid five shillings to stay away."

Clockwise from top left: Adolf Borsdorf, Thomas Busby, John Solomon and Henri van der Meerschen, founding fathers of the LSO

Hans Richter, who conducted the LSO's first concert

In 1904 the manager of the Queen's Hall, Robert Newman and the conductor of his promenade concerts, Henry Wood, agreed that they could no longer tolerate the deputy system. After a rehearsal in which Wood was faced with dozens of unfamiliar faces in his own orchestra, Newman came to the platform and announced: "Gentlemen, in future there will be no deputies! Good morning!" This caused a furore. Orchestral musicians were not highly paid, and removing their chances of better-paid engagements permitted by the deputy system was a serious financial blow to many of them. While travelling by train to play under Wood at a music festival in the north of England in May 1904, soon after Newman's announcement, some of his leading players discussed the situation and agreed to try to form their own orchestra. The principal movers were three horn players (Adolf Borsdorf, Thomas Busby, and Henri van der Meerschen) and a trumpeter, John Solomon.

=== Foundation ===
Busby organised a meeting at St Andrew's Hall, not far from the Queen's Hall. Invitations were sent to members of the Queen's Hall Orchestra (present and former). About a hundred players attended. Busby explained the scheme – a new ensemble, the London Symphony Orchestra, (Note: The orchestra was not the first to appear under this title: in the 1890s a group of about 41 players performed in London, Ontario, Canada, as the London Symphony Orchestra.) to be run on co-operative lines, "something akin to a Musical Republic" with a constitution that gave the organisation independence. (Note: The orchestra was incorporated under the Limited Liability Act with a capital of £1,000 in £1 shares. Every member was required to hold £10 in shares.) At concerts promoted by the LSO, the members worked without fee, their remuneration coming at the end of each season in a sharing of the orchestra's profits. A management committee was elected, comprising the four original founders and Alfred Hobday, and E. F James. Busby was appointed chief executive, a post variously titled "Secretary", "managing director", "general secretary" and "general manager" over the years.

Borsdorf was a player of international reputation, and through his influence, the orchestra secured Hans Richter to conduct its first concert. Newman held no grudge against the rebels and made the Queen's Hall available to them. He and Wood attended the LSO's first concert, on 9 June 1904. The programme consisted of the prelude to Die Meistersinger, music by Bach, Mozart, Elgar and Liszt, and finally Beethoven's Fifth Symphony. In a favourable review in The Times, J. A. Fuller Maitland noted that 49 members of the new orchestra were rebels against Newman's no-deputy rule, 32 had left the Queen's Hall Orchestra earlier, and the other 21 had no connection with Wood and Newman. In a profile of the orchestra in 1911, The Musical Times said:

Thus encouraged, the committee ventured to arrange for a series of symphony concerts at Queen's Hall. They had no regular conductor, and to this day they have pursued this policy of freedom. Dr. (now Sir) Frederic Cowen conducted the first concert of the series on October 27, 1904, and the others were conducted by Herr Arthur Nikisch, Mr. Fritz Steinbach, Sir Charles Stanford, M. Édouard Colonne, Sir Edward Elgar, and Mr. Georg Henschel. At every one of these concerts brilliant performances were given, and the reputation of the organization as one of the finest of its kind in the world was made.

=== Early years ===
The orchestra made its first British tour in 1905, conducted by Sir Edward Elgar. Elgar's conducting was highly praised; as to the orchestra, Ernest Newman wrote in The Manchester Guardian, "Its brass and its wood-wind were seen to be of exceptional quality, but the strings, fine as they are, have not the substance nor the colour of the Hallé strings." The following year the LSO played outside Britain for the first time, giving concerts in Paris, conducted by Édouard Colonne, Sir Charles Stanford and André Messager. Richard Morrison, in his centenary study of the LSO, writes of "stodgy programmes of insipid Cowen, worthy Stanford, dull Parry and mediocre Mackenzie".

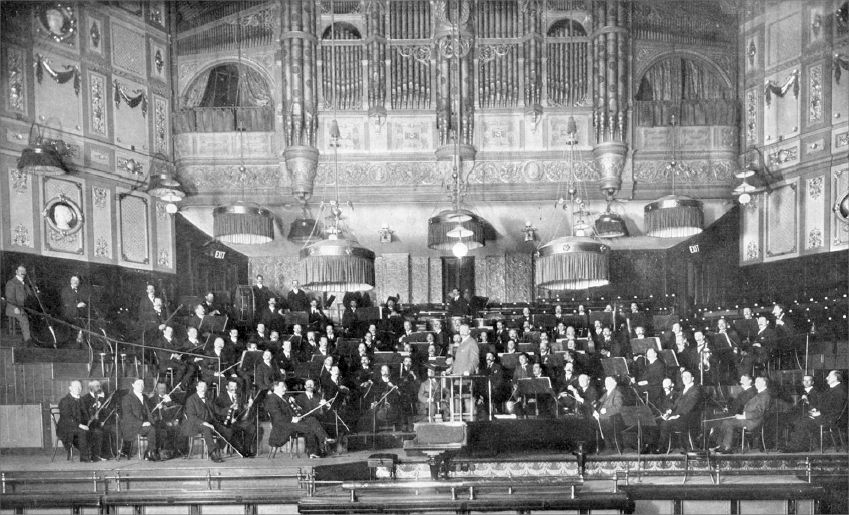
Elgar and the LSO, Queen's Hall, 1911

In its early years Richter was the LSO's most frequently engaged conductor, with four or five concerts every season; the orchestra's website and Morrison's 2004 book both count him as the orchestra's first chief conductor, though the 1911 Musical Times article indicates otherwise. Richter retired from conducting in 1911, and Elgar was elected conductor-in-chief for the 1911–12 season. Elgar conducted six concerts, Arthur Nikisch three, and Willem Mengelberg, Fritz Steinbach and Gustave Doret one each. As a conductor Elgar did not prove to be a big enough box-office draw, and after one season he was replaced by the charismatic Hungarian maestro Nikisch.

Nikisch was invited to tour North America in 1912, and despite his long association with the Berlin Philharmonic and Leipzig Gewandhaus Orchestra, he insisted that the LSO should be contracted for the tour. The orchestra, 100-strong (all men except for the harpist), was booked to sail on the Titanic, but the tour schedule was changed at the last minute, and the players sailed safely on the Baltic. The tour was arduous, but a triumph. The New York Press said, "The great British band played with a vigor, force and temperamental impetuousness that almost lifted the listener out of his seat." The New York Times praised all departments of the orchestra, though, like The Manchester Guardian, it found the strings "brilliant rather than mellow". The paper had a little fun at the LSO's expense: from the viewpoint of a country that had long enjoyed permanent, salaried orchestras such as the Boston Symphony, it gently mocked the LSO's "bold stand for the sacred right of sending substitutes"

=== First World War and 1920s ===
Shortly after the beginning of the war the board of the orchestra received a petition from rank and file players protesting about Borsdorf's continued membership of the LSO. Although he had done as much as anyone to found the orchestra, had lived in Britain for 30 years and was married to an Englishwoman, Borsdorf was regarded by some colleagues as an enemy alien and was forced out of the orchestra.

Sir Thomas Beecham, benefactor of the wartime LSO

During the war the musical life of Britain was drastically curtailed. The LSO was helped to survive by large donations from Sir Thomas Beecham, who also subsidised the Hallé and the Royal Philharmonic Society. For a year he took the role, though not the title, of chief conductor of the LSO. In 1916 his millionaire father died and Beecham's financial affairs became too complicated for any further musical philanthropy on his part. In 1917 the LSO's directors agreed unanimously that they would promote no more concerts until the end of the war. The orchestra played for other managements, and managed to survive, although the hitherto remunerative work for regional choral societies dwindled to almost nothing.

When peace resumed many of the former players were unavailable. A third of the orchestra's pre-war members were in the armed forces, and rebuilding was urgently needed. The orchestra was willing to allow the ambitious conductor Albert Coates to put himself forward as chief conductor. Coates had three attractions for the orchestra: he was a pupil of Nikisch, he had rich and influential contacts, and he was willing to conduct without fee. He and the orchestra got off to a disastrous start. Their first concert featured the premiere of Elgar's Cello Concerto. Apart from the concerto, which the composer conducted, the rest of the programme was conducted by Coates, who overran his rehearsal time at the expense of Elgar's. Lady Elgar wrote, "that brutal selfish ill-mannered bounder ... that brute Coates went on rehearsing." In The Observer Newman wrote, "There have been rumours about during the week of inadequate rehearsal. Whatever the explanation, the sad fact remains that never, in all probability, has so great an orchestra made so lamentable an exhibition of itself." Coates remained as chief conductor for two seasons, and after the initial debacle is credited by Morrison with "breathing life and energy into the orchestra".

After Coates left, the orchestra reverted to its preferred practice of engaging numerous guest conductors rather than a single principal conductor. Among the guests were Elgar, Beecham, Otto Klemperer, Bruno Walter, Wilhelm Furtwängler and Serge Koussevitzky; soloists in the 1920s included Sergei Rachmaninoff, Artur Schnabel and the young Yehudi Menuhin. Revenues were substantial, and the orchestra seemed to many to be entering into a golden age. In fact, for lack of any serious competition in the 1920s, the LSO allowed its standards of playing to slip. In 1927 the Berlin Philharmonic, under Furtwängler, gave two concerts at the Queen's Hall. These, and later concerts by the same orchestra in 1928 and 1929, made obvious the poor standards then prevailing in London. Both the BBC and Beecham had ambitions to bring London's orchestral standards up to those of Berlin. After an early attempt at co-operation between the BBC and Beecham, they went their separate ways. In 1929 the BBC began recruiting for the new BBC Symphony Orchestra under Adrian Boult. The prospect of joining a permanent, salaried orchestra was attractive enough to induce some LSO players to defect. The new orchestra immediately received enthusiastic reviews that contrasted starkly with the severe press criticisms of the LSO's playing. According to the critic W. J. Turner the LSO's problem was not that its playing had deteriorated, but that it had failed to keep up with the considerable improvements in playing achieved over the past two decades by the best European and American orchestras.

=== 1930s ===
In 1931 Beecham was approached by the rising young conductor Malcolm Sargent with a proposal to set up a permanent, salaried orchestra with a subsidy guaranteed by Sargent's patrons, the Courtauld family. Originally Sargent and Beecham had in mind a reorganised version of the LSO, but the orchestra baulked at weeding out and replacing underperforming players. In 1932 Beecham lost patience and agreed with Sargent to set up a new orchestra from scratch. The London Philharmonic Orchestra (LPO), as it was named, consisted of 106 players including a few young musicians straight from music college, many established players from provincial orchestras, and 17 of the LSO's leading members.

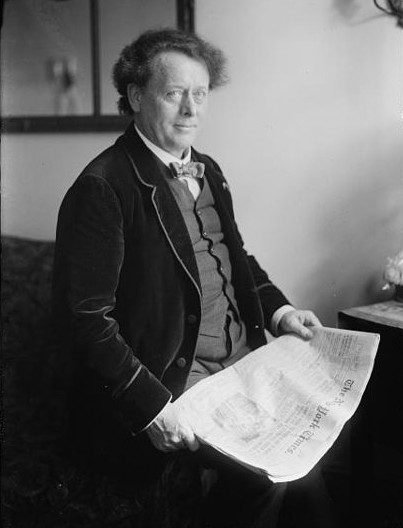
Willem Mengelberg

To try to raise its own standards the LSO had engaged Mengelberg, a famous orchestral trainer, known as a perfectionist. He made it a precondition that the deputy system must be abandoned, which occurred in 1929. He conducted the orchestra for the 1930 season, and music critics commented on the improvement in the playing. Nonetheless, as patently the third-best orchestra in London, the LSO lost work it had long been used to, including the Covent Garden seasons, the Royal Philharmonic Society concerts and the Courtauld-Sargent concerts. The orchestra persuaded Sir Hamilton Harty, the popular conductor of the Hallé Orchestra, to move from Manchester to become the LSO's principal conductor. Harty brought with him eight of the Hallé's leading players to replenish the LSO's ranks, depleted by defections to the BBC and Beecham. Critics including Neville Cardus recognised the continued improvement in the LSO's playing: "On this evening's hearing the London Symphony Orchestra is likely, after all, to give its two rivals a gallant run. Under Sir Hamilton it will certainly take on a style of sincere expression, distinguished from the virtuoso brilliance cultivated by the B.B.C. Orchestra and the London Philharmonic Orchestra under Beecham." Among the milestones on the orchestra's path to recovery were the premieres of Walton's Belshazzar's Feast (1930) and First Symphony (1934), showing the orchestra "capable of rising to the challenge of the most demanding contemporary scores" (Morrison).

The foundation of the Glyndebourne Festival in 1934 was another good thing for the LSO, as its players made up nearly the entirety of the festival orchestra. An important additional source of income for the orchestra was the film industry. In March 1935 the LSO recorded Arthur Bliss's incidental music for Alexander Korda's film Things to Come. According to the LSO's website the recording took 14 full orchestral sessions and "started a veritable revolution in film production history. ... For the first time, music for the cinema, previously regarded as a lowly art form, captured the attention of classical music scholars and enthusiasts, music critics and the film and music public. The LSO had begun its long historic journey as the premier film orchestra."

In London Harty did not prove to be a box-office draw, and according to Morrison, he was "brutally and hurtfully" dropped in 1934, as his LSO predecessor Elgar had been in 1912. After this the orchestra did not appoint a chief conductor for nearly 20 years. By 1939 the orchestra's board was planning an ambitious programme for 1940, with guests including Bruno Walter, Leopold Stokowski, Erich Kleiber and George Szell.

=== 1940s and 50s ===
When the Second World War broke out the orchestra's plans had to be almost completely changed. During the First World War the public's appetite for concert-going diminished drastically, but from the start of the Second it was clear that there was a huge demand for live music. The LSO arranged a series of concerts conducted by Wood, with whom the orchestra was completely reconciled. When the BBC evacuated its orchestra from London and abandoned the Proms, the LSO took over for Wood. The Carnegie Trust, with the support of the British government, contracted the LSO to tour Britain, taking live music to towns where symphony concerts were hitherto unknown.

The orchestra's loss of manpower was far worse in the Second World War than in the First. Between 1914 and 1918 there were 33 members of the LSO away on active service; between 1939 and 1945 there were more than 60, of whom seven were killed. The orchestra found replacements wherever it could, including the bands of army regiments based in London, whose brass and woodwind players were unofficially recruited.

During the war it had become clear that private patronage was no longer a practical means of sustaining Britain's musical life; a state body, the Council for the Encouragement of Music and the Arts – the forerunner of the Arts Council – was established, and given a modest budget for public subsidy. The council made it a condition of sponsoring the LSO that the profit-sharing principle should be abandoned and the players made salaried employees. This renunciation of the principles for which the LSO had been founded was rejected by the players, and the offered subsidy was declined.

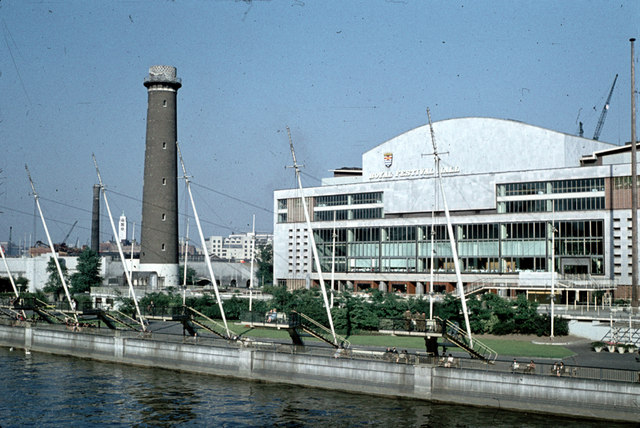
Royal Festival Hall: the LSO and LPO battled each other for residency in 1951

At the end of the war the LSO had to face new competition. The BBC Symphony Orchestra and the London Philharmonic Orchestra had survived the war intact, the latter, abandoned by Beecham, as a self-governing body. All three were quickly overshadowed by two new orchestras: Walter Legge's Philharmonia and Beecham's Royal Philharmonic Orchestra. To survive, the LSO played in hundreds of concerts of popular classics under undistinguished conductors. By 1948 the orchestra was anxious to resume promoting its own concert series. The players decided to accept the Arts Council's conditions for subsidy, and changed the LSO's constitution to replace profit-sharing with salaries. With a view to raising its playing standards it engaged Josef Krips as conductor. His commitments in Vienna preventing him from becoming the LSO's chief conductor until 1950, but from his first concert with the orchestra in December 1948 he influenced the playing for the better. His chosen repertoire was good for the box office: cycles of Beethoven symphonies and concertos (the latter featuring Wilhelm Kempff in one season and Claudio Arrau in another) helped restore the orchestra's finances as well as its musical standards. With Krips and others the orchestra recorded extensively for the Decca Record Company during the early 1950s. The orchestra's workload in these years was second only to the other self-governing London orchestra, the LPO: the LPO played 248 concerts in the 1949–50 season; the LSO 103; the BBC SO 55; the Philharmonia and RPO 32 each. When the Royal Festival Hall opened in 1951 the LSO and LPO engaged in a mutually bruising campaign for sole residency there. Neither was successful, and the Festival Hall became the main London venue for both orchestras and for the RPO and Philharmonia.

Krips left the LSO in 1954, and the following year tensions between the orchestral principals and the rank-and-file players erupted into an irreconcilable dispute. The principals argued that the future of the LSO lay in profitable session work for film companies, rather than in the overcrowded field of London concerts. They also wished to be free to accept such engagements individually, absenting themselves from concerts if there were a clash of dates. The LSO's board, which reflected the majority opinion of the players, refused to accommodate the principals, most of whom resigned en masse, to form the Sinfonia of London, a session ensemble that flourished from the mid-1950s to the early 1960s, and then faded away. (Note: Morrison comments that the LSO would probably also have faded away if it had gone down the same route. The Sinfonia of London was no longer extant at the time of the Peacock Committee's report on orchestral resources in Great Britain in 1970, where it is not mentioned in the lists of chamber or symphony orchestras. The Sinfonia's director, the flautist and former LSO chairman, Gordon Walker, died in 1965. The title "Sinfonia of London" was purchased from his heirs in 1982 for use by a new ensemble.) For fifteen years after the split the LSO did little film work, recording only six soundtracks between 1956 and 1971, compared with more than 70 films between 1940 and 1955.

To replace the departing principals the LSO recruited rising young players including Hugh Maguire, Neville Marriner and Simon Streatfeild in the string sections, Gervase de Peyer and William Waterhouse in the woodwinds, and Barry Tuckwell and Denis Wick in the brass. With the new intake the orchestra rapidly advanced in standards and status. The average age of the LSO players dropped to about 30. In 1956 the orchestra visited South Africa to play at the Johannesburg Festival. The players were impressed by the dynamic director of the festival, Ernest Fleischmann, and engaged him as general secretary of the orchestra when the post fell vacant in 1959. He was the LSO's first professional manager; all his predecessors as secretary/managing director had been orchestral players combining the duties with their orchestral playing.

=== 1960s ===
To raise the profile and prestige of the orchestra, Fleischman strove to attract top soloists and conductors to work with the LSO. After Krips's resignation the orchestra had worked with a few leading conductors, including Klemperer, Stokowski, Jascha Horenstein and Pierre Monteux, but also with many less eminent ones. Fleischmann later said, "It wasn't difficult to change the list of conductors that the orchestra worked with, because one couldn't do much worse, really". (Note: Among those under whom the LSO played during the middle and late 1950s were lesser-known conductors such as Leighton Lucas, Alan J. Kirby, Gaston Poulet, John Russell, Eugen Szenkar, Thornton Lofthouse, Foster Clark, Royalton Kisch, Thomas Scherman and Samuel Rosenheim.) A rising conductor of a younger generation, Georg Solti, began working with the LSO; Fleischmann persuaded the management of the Vienna Festival to engage the LSO with Solti, Stokowski and Monteux for the 1961 Festwochen.

Pierre Monteux

While in Vienna, Fleischmann persuaded Monteux to accept the chief conductorship of the orchestra. Though 86 years old, Monteux asked for, and received, a 25-year contract with a 25-year option of renewal. He lived for another three years, working with the LSO to within weeks of his death. Members of the LSO believed that in those few years he had transformed the orchestra; Neville Marriner said that Monteux "made them feel like an international orchestra ... He gave them extended horizons and some of his achievements with the orchestra, both at home and abroad, gave them quite a different constitution." Announcing Monteux's appointment, Fleischmann added that the LSO would also work frequently with Antal Doráti and the young Colin Davis.

Together with Tuckwell, chairman of the orchestra, Fleischmann worked to create the LSO Trust, a fund to finance tours and provide sick and holiday pay for LSO players, thus ending, as Morrison says, "nearly sixty years of 'no play, no pay' ... this was a revolution." They also pioneered formal sponsorship by commercial firms: the orchestra's "Peter Stuyvesant" concerts, underwritten by the tobacco company of that name, were given in London, Guildford, Bournemouth, Manchester and Swansea. The company also sponsored LSO commissions of new works by British composers.

In 1964 the LSO undertook its first world tour, taking in Israel, Turkey, Iran, India, Hong Kong, Korea, Japan and the United States. The following year István Kertész was appointed principal conductor. Negotiations with the Corporation of the City of London with a view to establishing the LSO as the resident orchestra of the planned Barbican Centre began in the same year. In 1966 Leonard Bernstein conducted the LSO for the first time, in Mahler's Symphony of a Thousand at the Royal Albert Hall. This was another coup for Fleischmann, who had to overcome Bernstein's scorn for the inadequate rehearsal facilities endured by London orchestras. Bernstein remained associated with the LSO for the rest of his life, and was its president from 1987 to 1990.

Mindful of the enormous success of the Philharmonia Chorus, founded in 1957 by Legge to work with his Philharmonia Orchestra, the LSO decided to establish its own chorus. The LSO Chorus (later called the London Symphony Chorus) was formed in 1966 under John Alldis as chorus master. Its early years were difficult; Kertész did not get on with Alldis, and there were difficulties within the chorus. Most of its members were amateurs, but at first, they were reinforced by a small number of professionals. This led to disputes over the balance between amateurs and professionals. There was a brief crisis, after which the professional element was removed, and the LSO chorus became, and remains, an outstanding amateur chorus.

By 1967 many in the LSO felt that Fleischmann was seeking to exert too much influence on the affairs of the orchestra, and he resigned. Kertész, too, was dispensed with when he sought control of all artistic matters; his contract was not renewed when it expired in 1968. His successor as principal conductor was André Previn, who held the post for 11 years – the longest tenure of the post to date.

By the Previn era the LSO was being described as the finest of the London orchestras. A reviewer of an Elgar recording by one of the other orchestras remarked, "these symphonies really deserve the LSO at its peak." The implication that the LSO was not always at its peak was illustrated when Sir Adrian Boult, who was recording Elgar and Vaughan Williams with the LSO, refused to continue when he discovered that five leading principals had absented themselves. EMI took Boult's side, and the orchestra apologised.

=== 1970s and 80s ===
In 1971 John Culshaw of BBC television commissioned "André Previn's Music Night", bringing classical music to a large new audience. Previn would talk informally direct to camera and then turn and conduct the LSO, whose members were dressed in casual sweaters or shirts rather than formal evening clothes. The programme attracted unprecedented viewing figures for classical music; Morrison writes, "More British people heard the LSO play in Music Night in one week than in sixty-five years of LSO concerts." Several series of the programme were screened between 1971 and 1977. Previn's popularity with the public enabled him and the LSO to programme works that under other conductors could have been box-office disasters, such as Messiaen's Turangalila Symphony. In the early 1970s the LSO recorded two firsts for a British orchestra, appearing at the Salzburg Festival, conducted by Previn, Seiji Ozawa and Karl Böhm, in 1973, and playing at the Hollywood Bowl the following year.

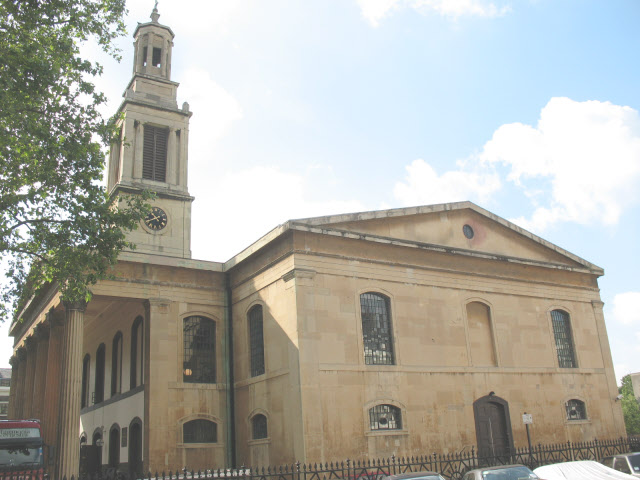
Henry Wood Hall, acquired and converted by the LSO and the LPO in the 1970s

The lack of good rehearsal facilities to which Bernstein had objected was addressed in the 1970s when, jointly with the LPO, the LSO acquired and restored a disused church in Southwark, converting it into the Henry Wood Hall, a convenient and acoustically excellent rehearsal space and recording studio, opened in 1975.

In 1978 two aspects of the LSO's non-symphonic work were recognised. The orchestra shared in three Grammy awards for the score to Star Wars; and the LSO "Classic Rock" recordings, in the words of the orchestra's website, became hugely popular and provided handsome royalties. The recordings led to "Classic Rock" tours by the orchestra, characterised by Morrison as "enormously lucrative but artistically demeaning."

Claudio Abbado, principal guest conductor since 1971, succeeded Previn as chief conductor in the orchestra's diamond jubilee year, 1979. In a 1988 study of the LSO in Gramophone magazine James Jolly wrote that Abbado was in many ways the antithesis of Previn in terms of style and repertoire, bringing to the orchestra a particular authority in the Austro-German classics as well as a commitment to the avant-garde. From the orchestra's point of view there were disadvantages to his appointment. His relationship with the players was distant and he was unable to impose discipline on the orchestra in rehearsals. He insisted on conducting without a score, and many times this led to barely avoided disaster in concerts. Abbado had considerable international prestige, but this too had its downside for the LSO: he frequently made his major recordings with the Boston or Chicago Symphony Orchestras or the Vienna Philharmonic. One of the LSO's principals commented, "Although we were sweating our guts playing those vast Mahler symphonies for ... Abbado, he would go and record them with other orchestras, which made us feel like second, maybe even third choice".

In 1982 the LSO took up residence at the Barbican. In the first years of the residency, the orchestra came close to financial disaster, primarily because of over-ambitious programming and the poor ticket sales that resulted. The Times commented that the LSO "were tempted by their own need for challenge (and a siren chorus of critics) to begin a series of more modern and adventurous music: six nights a week of Tippett, Berlioz, Webern, Stockhausen designed to draw in a new public. Instead it put an old audience to flight." The LSO's difficulties were compounded by the satirical magazine Private Eye, which ran a series of defamatory articles about the orchestra. The articles were almost wholly untrue and the magazine was forced to pay substantial libel damages, but in the short term serious damage was done to the orchestra's reputation and morale.

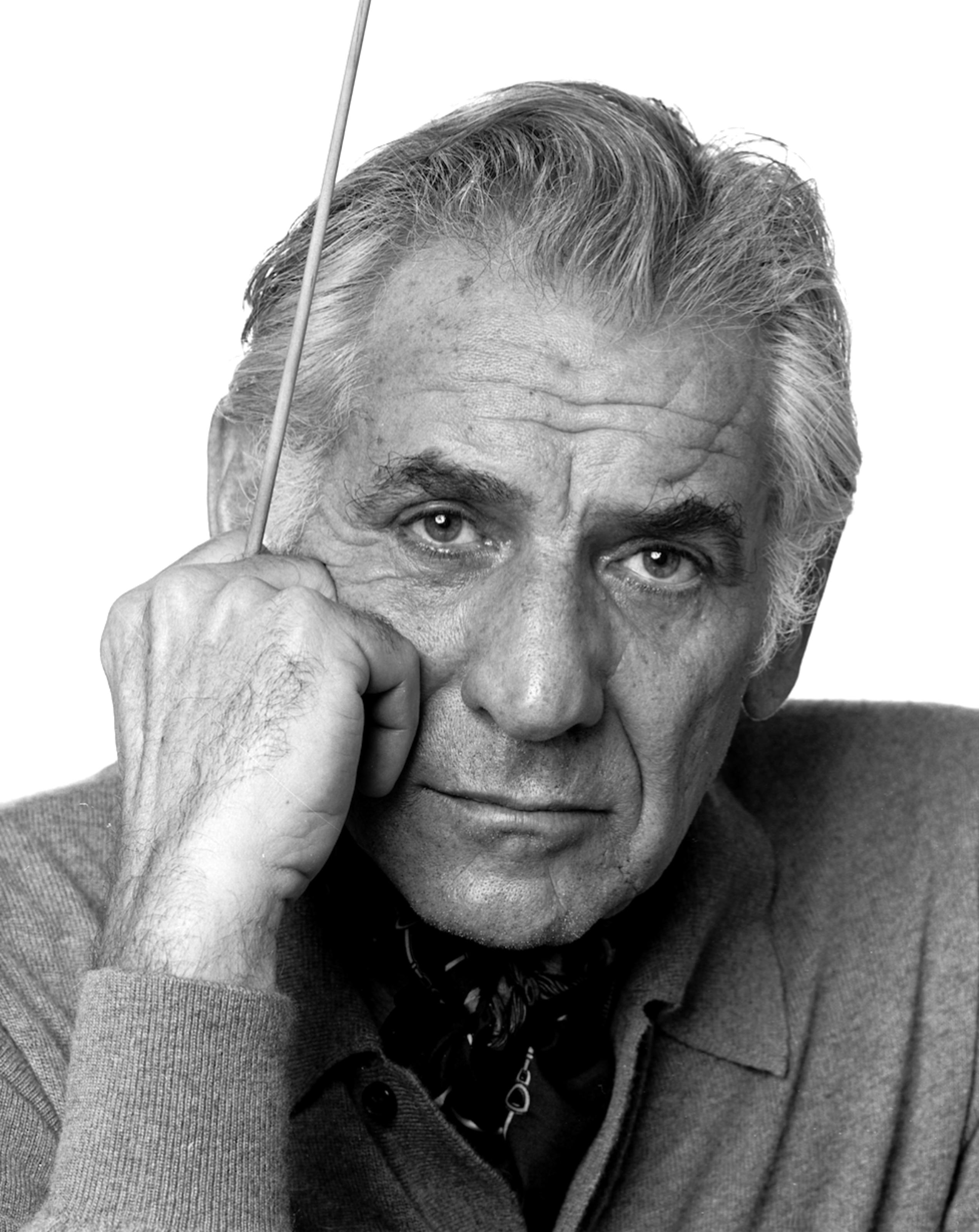
Leonard Bernstein

In August 1984, the orchestra's managing director, Peter Hemmings, resigned. For the first time since 1949, the orchestra appointed one of its players to the position. (Note: The last internal appointee to the post had been the woodwind player John Cruft who held it from 1949 to 1959. Since then the post had been held by Fleischmann, Harold Lawrence (1968–73), John Boyden (1974–75), Michael Kaye (1975–79) and Hemmings (1980–84), whose backgrounds were in administration and management.) Clive Gillinson, a cellist, took over at a difficult time in the LSO's fortunes, and played a central role in turning them round. He negotiated what Morrison calls "a dazzling series of mega-projects, each built around the personal enthusiasm of a 'star' conductor or soloist", producing sell-out houses. In 1985 the orchestra mounted "Mahler, Vienna and the Twentieth Century", planned by Abbado, followed the next year by an equally successful Bernstein festival.

During 1988 the orchestra adopted an education policy which included the establishment of "LSO Discovery", offering "people of all ages, from babies through music students to adults, an opportunity to get involved in music-making".

In September 1988 Michael Tilson Thomas succeeded Abbado as chief conductor.

In 1989 the Royal Philharmonic Society established its Orchestra Award for "excellence in playing and playing standards"; the LSO was the first winner.

=== 1990s to the present ===
The LSO visited Japan in 1990 with Bernstein and Thomas. The conductors and players took part in the inaugural Pacific Music Festival in Sapporo, teaching and giving masterclasses for 123 young musicians from 18 countries. Colin Matthews was appointed as the orchestra's associate composer in 1991, and the following year Richard McNicol became LSO Discovery's first music animateur. Gillison secured increased funding from the Arts Council, the City of London Corporation and commercial sponsors, enabling the orchestra to set up a system of joint principals, attracting top musicians who could play in the LSO without having to give up their solo or chamber careers.

In 1993 the LSO again featured in a British television series, playing in Concerto! with Tilson Thomas and Dudley Moore. Among those appearing were Alicia de Larrocha, James Galway, Steven Isserlis, Barry Douglas, Richard Stoltzman and Kyoko Takezawa. The series received an Emmy Award. In 1994 the orchestra and the Royal Shakespeare Company (RSC), resident at the Barbican Theatre, came under threat from a new managing director of the Barbican Centre, Baroness O'Cathain, an economist with no cultural background. O'Cathain, described by Morrison as "a Thatcherite free marketeer", dismissed the LSO and RSC as "arty-farty types", and opposed public subsidy. Such was the press and public reaction that she was obliged to seek a vote of confidence from the LSO and RSC; failing to gain it, she resigned, and was succeeded by John Tusa, whom Morrison called "steeped in culture." The danger that the concert hall would become a conference centre was averted.

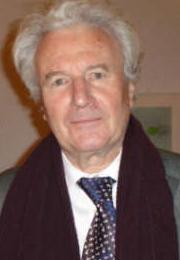
Sir Colin Davis

In 1995, the orchestra appointed Sir Colin Davis as principal conductor. He had first conducted the LSO in 1959, and had been widely expected to succeed Monteux as principal conductor in 1964. Among the most conspicuous of Davis's projects with the orchestra was the LSO's most ambitious festival thus far, the "Berlioz Odyssey", in which all Berlioz's major works were given. The festival continued into 2000. Many of the performances, including Les Troyens, were recorded for the orchestra's new CD label, LSO Live, launched in 2000. Les Troyens won two Grammy awards. Author Jilly Cooper spent time with the orchestra in the 1990s researching for her novel Appassionata.

In 2003, with backing from the banking firm UBS, the orchestra opened LSO St Luke's, its music education centre, in a former church near the Barbican. The following year the orchestra celebrated its centenary, with a gala concert attended by the LSO's patron, the Queen. After serving as managing director for 21 years, Clive Gillinson left to become chief executive of Carnegie Hall, New York. In 2005, Kathryn McDowell succeeded Gillinson as managing director.

In 2006, Daniel Harding joined Michael Tilson Thomas as principal guest conductor. At the end of 2006, Davis stood down as principal conductor and became president of the LSO in January 2007, its first since the death of Bernstein in 1990. Valery Gergiev became principal conductor of the LSO on 1 January 2007. In Gergiev's first season in charge a complete cycle of Mahler Symphonies was given, with the Barbican Hall sold out for every concert. In 2009 Davis and the LSO celebrated 50 years of working together. In the same year the LSO took over from the Berlin Philharmonic as the resident orchestra at the Aix-en-Provence Festival, adding to a roster of international residences at venues including the Lincoln Center in New York, the Salle Pleyel in Paris and the Daytona Beach International Festival in Florida. In 2010 the LSO visited Poland and Abu Dhabi for the first time and made its first return to India since the 1964 world tour. The orchestra played at the 2012 Summer Olympics opening ceremony, conducted by Sir Simon Rattle.

In March 2015, the LSO simultaneously announced the departure of Gergiev as principal conductor at the end of 2015, and the appointment of Sir Simon Rattle as its music director from September 2017, with an initial contract of five years. In February 2016 the orchestra announced that beginning with the 2016–17 season Gianandrea Noseda would be titled "Principal Guest Conductor" (joining the orchestra's other Principal Guest Conductor, Daniel Harding, who held that post 2006-2017), and that Michael Tilson Thomas would be titled "Conductor Laureate" and Andre Previn would be titled "Conductor Emeritus." In January 2021 the LSO announced an extension of Rattle's contract as music director until the end of the 2023 season, after which he was given the title of Conductor Emeritus for life.

Sir Antonio Pappano first guest-conducted the LSO in 1996. In March 2021, the LSO announced his appointment as its next chief conductor, effective in September 2024. In February 2022, the orchestra announced Barbara Hannigan as its "Associate Artist" for three years.

McDowell is scheduled to stand down as managing director of the LSO in July 2026. In January 2026, the orchestra announced the appointment of John Harte as its next managing director, effective in August 2026.

== Reputation ==
The LSO has, on at least three occasions, been ranked as one of the world's leading orchestras. In a 1988 Gramophone article James Jolly said of it:

Some would claim ... that it is the most American of our orchestras, thinking no doubt of the Previn legacy, Bernstein's Presidency and Tilson Thomas's appointment. Others, looking back further to Pierre Monteux's reign, think it our most French orchestra, a quality nurtured by Previn and latterly Claudio Abbado. But what of their essaying of the Slavonic repertoire under Istvan Kertész, or of Mahler, whose idiom has been finely honed by Abbado? No, the LSO remains enigmatic, unpredictable and supremely individual. Of all the London orchestras, the LSO seems to have more "personalities", more "individuals" and has given the solo world more than its fair share of "star" performers. As an orchestra the LSO has never been prepared to submit to one principal conductor for long (one thinks of Karajan in Berlin, Haitink in Amsterdam or Mravinsky in Leningrad) (Note: Herbert von Karajan was chief conductor of the Berlin Philharmonic from 1954 to 1989; Bernard Haitink was chief conductor of the Concertgebouw Orchestra, Amsterdam from 1961 to 1988; Evgeny Mravinsky was chief conductor of the Leningrad Philharmonic from 1938 to 1988.) but one of its greatest strengths remains its ability to attract fine conductors and dedicate itself wholeheartedly to creating a genuine performance.

For many years, the LSO had a reputation as an almost exclusively male ensemble (female harpists excepted). Morrison describes the LSO of the 1960s and 1970s as "a rambunctious boys' club that swaggered round the globe." Before the 1970s one of the few women to play in the orchestra was the oboist Evelyn Rothwell, who joined in the 1930s and found herself regarded as an outsider by her male colleagues. She was not admitted to full membership of the orchestra: the first woman to be elected as a member of the LSO was Renata Scheffel-Stein in 1975. By that time other British orchestras had left the LSO far behind in this regard. (Note: In 1971 the BBC SO had 16 women players, the LPO and Philharmonia (by then known as the New Philharmonia) 12 each. The proportion of female players was considerably higher in the main regional orchestras.)

By 2004, about 20 per cent of the LSO's members were women. Some musicians, including Davis, judged that this improved the orchestra's playing as well as its behaviour. Others, including Previn and the veteran principal trumpet Maurice Murphy, felt that although the technical standard of playing had improved, the diminution of the orchestra's machismo was a matter for regret. Comparing the LSO of 2004 with the orchestra of the 1960s and 1970s, Murphy said, "Now the strings have improved so much, the playing is fantastic, but it has lost something of its gung-ho quality." The orchestra of the 1960s had a reputation for tormenting conductors it disliked; even such notorious martinets as George Szell were given a hard time. By the 21st century the orchestra had long abandoned such aggression; civilities were maintained even with conductors whom the orchestra took against: they were simply never re-engaged.

== Recordings ==
=== Audio ===
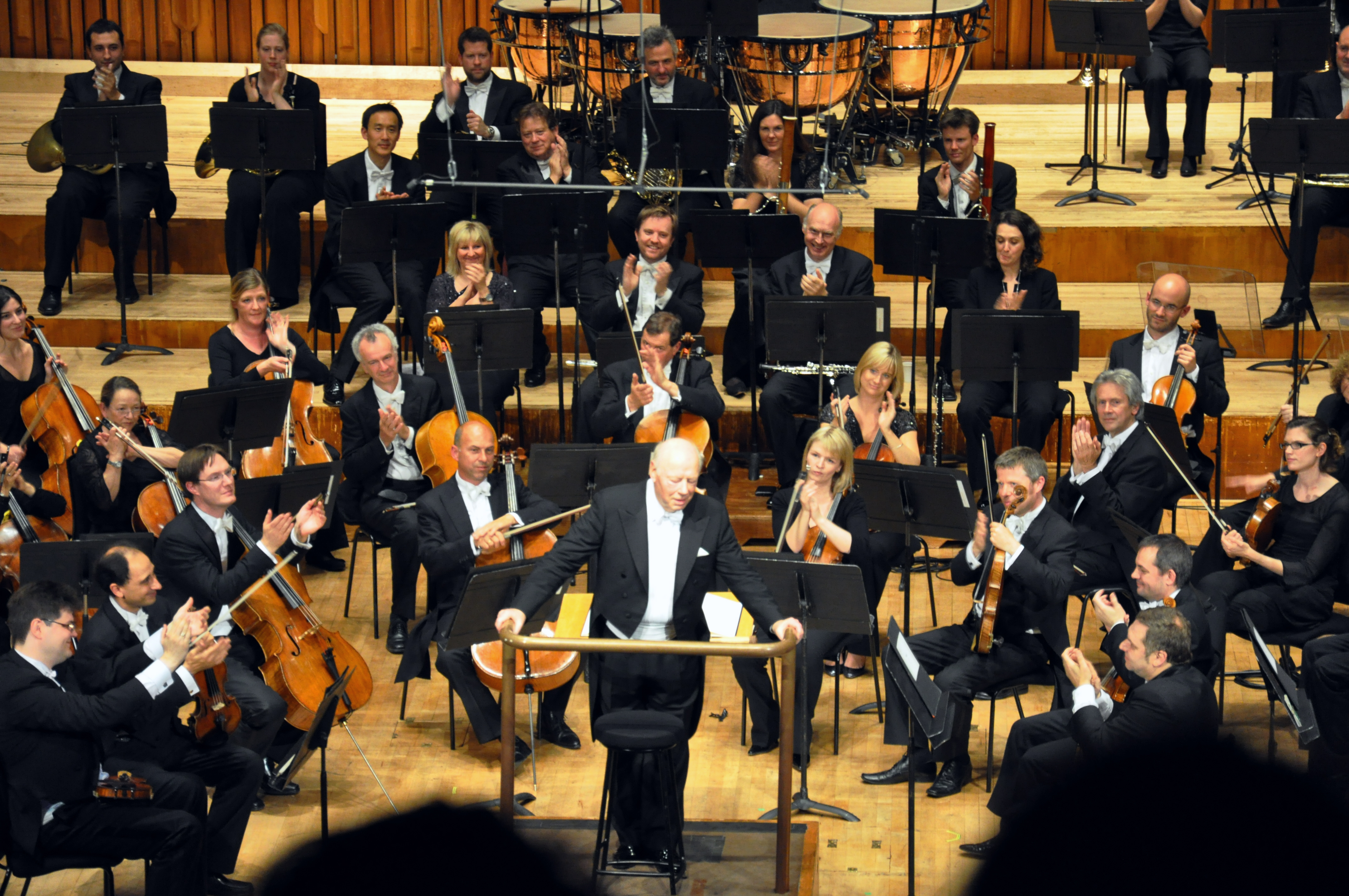
The LSO at the Barbican, 2011. Front, left to right, Roman Simović, Carmine Lauri (violins), Alastair Blayden, Tim Hugh (cellos), Bernard Haitink (conductor), Gillianne Haddow, Edward Vanderspar (violas), Tom Norris, Evgeny Grach (violins). Players to the rear include David Pyatt (horn), Andrew Marriner (clarinet), Rachel Gough (bassoon)

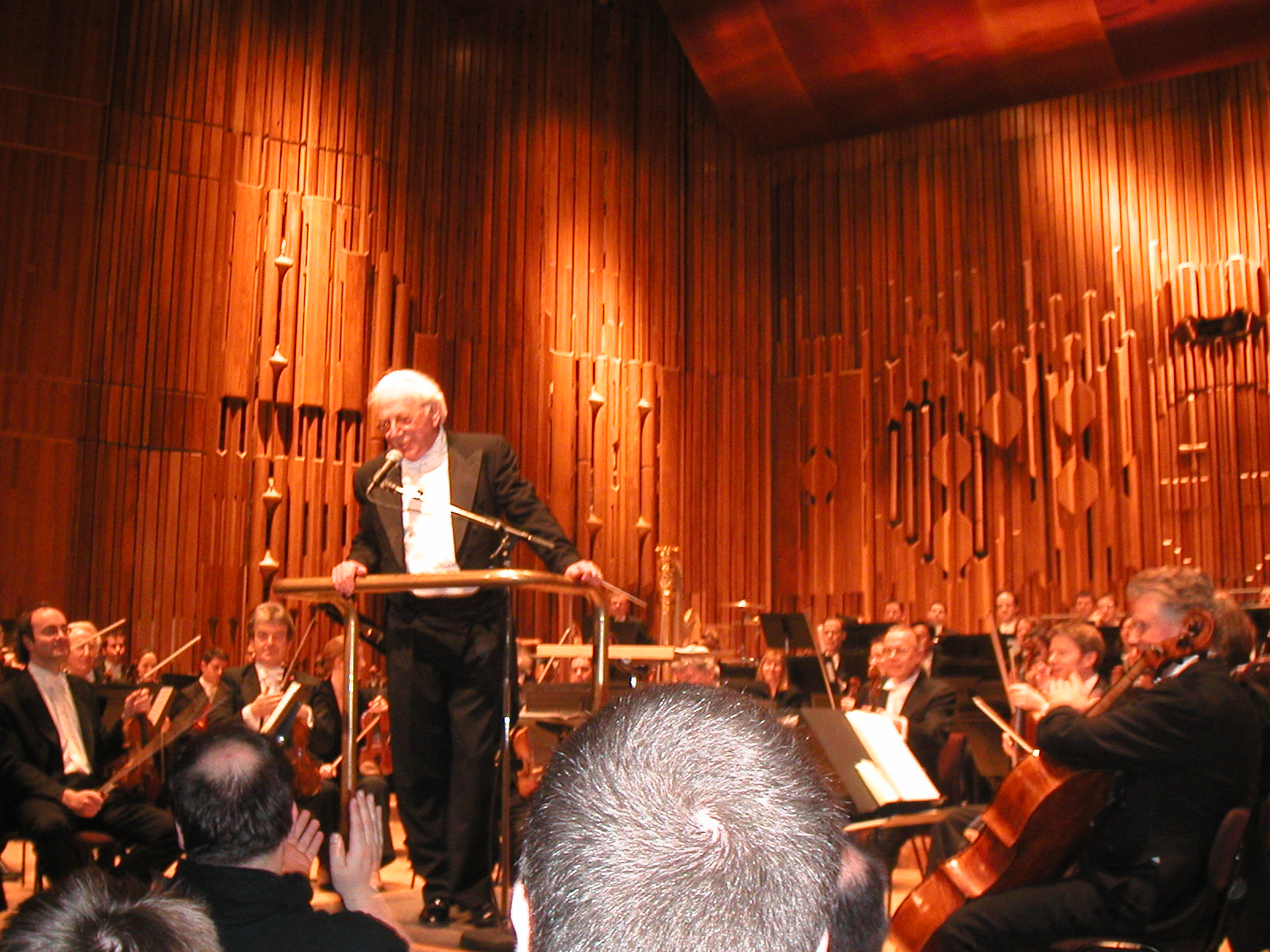
LSO concert of film music at the Barbican, 2003. Left to right: Gordan Nikolitch and Lennox Mackenzie (violins), Jerry Goldsmith (conductor), Paul Silverthorne (viola), Moray Welsh (cello)

The LSO has made recordings since the early days of recording, beginning with acoustic versions under Nikisch of Beethoven's Egmont Overture, Weber's Oberon Overture, and Liszt's Hungarian Rhapsody in F minor, followed soon after by the overtures to Der Freischütz and The Marriage of Figaro. His Master's Voice's Fred Gaisberg, who supervised the sessions, wrote of "virtuoso playing which was unique at that time". Since then, according to the orchestra's website, the LSO has made more recordings than any other orchestra, a claim endorsed by Gramophone magazine. In 1920 the LSO signed a three-year contract with the Columbia Graphophone Company and what Jolly calls "a magnificent series of recordings" followed. Under Felix Weingartner the orchestra recorded Mozart (Symphony No 39), Beethoven (the Fifth, Seventh and Eighth Symphonies) and Brahms's First. Other recordings from this period included the premiere recording of Holst's The Planets, conducted by the composer, and Richard Strauss's Don Juan, Ein Heldenleben and Tod und Verklärung, likewise conducted by their composer.

When Elgar recorded his major works for His Master's Voice in the late 1920s and early 1930s, the LSO was chosen for most of the recordings. (Note: The LSO plays on the recordings of both Symphonies, the Violin Concerto (with Menuhin), the Cello Concerto (with Beatrice Harrison), Falstaff, In the South, and many of the lighter pieces including The Wand of Youth and Nursery suites.) The LSO's pre-war recordings for Decca include Hamilton Harty's version of Walton's First Symphony, of which Gramophone magazine said, "There are one or two moments where the LSO are audibly hanging on by the skin of their teeth, but these moments simply add to the ferocious impact of the music".

In the 1950s and early 1960s, EMI generally made its British recordings with the Royal Philharmonic and Philharmonia orchestras; the LSO's recordings were chiefly for Decca, including a Sibelius symphony cycle with Anthony Collins, French music under Monteux, early recordings by Solti, and a series of Britten's major works, conducted by the composer. Of the later 1960s Jolly writes, "Istvan Kertész's three-year Principal Conductorship has left a treasure trove of memorable and extraordinarily resilient recordings – the Dvořák symphonies are still competitive ... and his classic disc of Bartók's Duke Bluebeard's Castle admirably demonstrates what a superb ensemble the LSO were under his baton."

In 1973 Previn and the LSO were at the peak of their powers when they made the first complete, uncut recording of Rachmaninov's Second Symphony. The recording has been described as "overpoweringly convincing" and having "a feeling of one-ness between orchestra and conductor which is the hallmark of a great recording".

Since 2000, the LSO has published commercial CD recordings on its own label, LSO Live. Recordings are made live at the Barbican hall over several dates and are edited in post-production. Initially available on CD they have since been issued on Super Audio CD and also as downloads. LSO Live has published more than 70 recordings featuring conductors including Gergiev, Davis and Bernard Haitink. Gergiev's version of Prokofiev's Romeo and Juliet was BBC Music Magazine's Disc of the Year in 2011, and Davis's discs of Berlioz's Symphonie fantastique and Les Troyens and Dvořák's Eighth Symphony were BBC Radio 3's top recommendations in comparative reviews of all available versions.

=== Film ===
Even in the era of silent films the LSO was associated with the cinema. During the 1920s the orchestra played scores arranged and conducted by Eugene Goossens to accompany screenings of The Three Musketeers (1922), The Nibelungs (1924), The Constant Nymph (1927) and The Life of Beethoven (1929).

Since 1935 the LSO has recorded the musical scores of more than 200 films. The orchestra owed its engagement for its first soundtrack sessions to Muir Mathieson, musical director of Korda Studios. On the LSO's website, the film specialist Robert Rider calls Mathieson "the most important single figure in the early history of British film music, who enlisted Bliss to write a score for Things to Come, and who was subsequently responsible for bringing the most eminent British 20th-century composers to work for cinema." Mathieson described the LSO as "the perfect film orchestra". Among the composers commissioned by Mathieson for LSO soundtracks were Vaughan Williams, Walton, Britten and Malcolm Arnold and lighter composers including Eric Coates and Noël Coward.

As a pinnacle of Mathieson's collaboration with the LSO, Rider cites the 1946 film Instruments of the Orchestra, a film record of the LSO at work. Sargent conducted the orchestra in a performance of Britten's The Young Person's Guide to the Orchestra, composed for the film. Rider adds, "Mathieson's documentary, with its close-ups of the musicians and their instruments, beautifully captures the vibrancy and texture of the Orchestra amidst the optimism of the post-Second World War era."

Another milestone in the LSO's history in film music was in 1977 with the recording of John Williams's score for the first of the Star Wars films. Rider comments that this film and its sequels "attracted a new group of admirers and consolidated the period of film music activity for the Orchestra, which continues unabated to this day". The LSO also recorded other Williams film scores, including Superman: The Movie (1978) and Raiders of the Lost Ark (1981) and six of the eight films from the Harry Potter film series.

== Premieres ==
The orchestra has given the world premieres of works by numerous composers from Britain and overseas. The British composers have included Arnold Bax, Arthur Bliss, Benjamin Britten, George Butterworth, Frederick Delius, Edward Elgar, Michael Tippett, Ralph Vaughan Williams, William Walton, and more recently Richard Rodney Bennett, James MacMillan, Thomas Adés, George Benjamin, Alex Paxton, Tansy Davies, Jasmin Kent Rodgman, Robin Haigh, Peter Maxwell Davies and Paul McCartney. The LSO has given world premieres of works by American and Continental European composers including John Adams, Leonard Bernstein, Aaron Copland, André Previn, Hans Werner Henze, Betsy Jolas, Sofia Gubaidulina, Augusta Read Thomas, Magnus Linberg, Luke Mombrea, Aram Khachaturian and Krzysztof Penderecki. Among the premieres were Vaughan Williams's Fantasia on a Theme of Thomas Tallis, conducted by the composer (1910), Elgar's Falstaff, conducted by the composer (1913), Walton's Belshazzar's Feast, conducted by Malcolm Sargent (1931) and Britten's The Young Person's Guide to the Orchestra, conducted by Sargent (1946).

== See also ==
- Culture of London

== Notes and references ==
Notes

=== Sources ===
- Aldous, Richard (2001). Tunes of Glory: The Life of Malcolm Sargent. London: Hutchinson. ISBN 0-09-180131-1.
- Hill, Ralph (1951). Music 1951. Harmondsworth: Penguin Books. OCLC 26147349.
- Jacobs, Arthur (1994). Henry J. Wood: Maker of the Proms. London: Methuen. ISBN 0-413-69340-6.
- Kennedy, Michael (1987). Adrian Boult. London: Hamish Hamilton. ISBN 0-333-48752-4.
- Morrison, Richard (2004). Orchestra: The LSO: A Century of Triumph and Turbulence. London: Faber & Faber. ISBN 978-0-57-121584-3.
- Peacock, Alan (1970). A Report on Orchestral Resources in Great Britain. London: Arts Council of Great Britain. ISBN 9780119810622. OCLC 150610520.
- Previn, André, ed. (1979). Orchestra. London: Macdonald and Jane's. ISBN 0-354-04420-6.
- Reid, Charles (1961). Thomas Beecham – An Independent Biography. London: Victor Gollancz. OCLC 500565141.
- Shore, Bernard (1938). The Orchestra Speaks. London: Longmans. OCLC 499119110.
- Stradling, Robert A.; Hughes, Meirion (2001). The English Musical Renaissance, 1840–1940: constructing a national music. Manchester: Manchester University Press. ISBN 0-7190-5829-5.
- Wood, Henry J. (1938). My Life of Music. London: Victor Gollancz. OCLC 30533927.
