= Harry Berly =

British violist and saxophonist (1905–1937)

- Born: Henry James Berly; December , 1905; Battersea, London, United Kingdom
- Died: March 25, 1937 London Borough of Lambeth, United Kingdom
- Genres: Classical, dance band
- Occupation: Musician
- Instruments: Viola, Saxophone, Clarinet, Violin, Ocarina
- Formerly of: International String Quartet, Queen’s Hall Orchestra, Ray Noble Band, Lew Stone Band, Jack Hylton Band

Harry Berly (December 1905 – March 1937) was a British violist, saxophonist, clarinetist and violinist, who played with a number of British Dance Bands in the 1920s and 30s. He also appeared at the Proms and played with the International String Quartet.

== Early life ==
Berly was born in Battersea, London in 1905 to James Henry Berly, a waiter in a club and Emily Osmond.

== Career ==
Berly had lessons on the violin with Ethel Martin at the Tower House School of Music in East Sheen, before gaining a scholarship, at the age of 14, to study viola at the Royal Academy of Music in London with Lionel Tertis. Tertis stated that Berly was the best student he ever had, and had high hopes for him as a viola soloist.

Berly received the Ada Lewis Scholarship at the RAM in 1920. In 1922 he was awarded the Lesley Alexander Gift from the RAM, "To be bestowed on a Viola or Violoncello student selected by the Principal.", and received the award again in 1925.

In November 1922 he gave the first performance of William Alwyn's Three preludes for viola and piano with Alwyn, a fellow RAM student, at the piano. In 1923 and 1925 whilst a student at the RAM, his quartet won the Sir Edward Cooper Prize. The 1923 quartet was led by Jean Pougnet, with Wynford Reynolds on second violin, Berly on viola and Frank Leonard on cello. The 1925 quartet was led by Enid Bailey, with Philip Burton on second violin and Doris Vevers on cello.

The quartet accompanied the soprano Miss Dora Stevens at a recital at the Wigmore Hall in London in April 1924. In December 1924, Berly performed the slow movement from Berlioz's Harold in Italy at the Queen's Hall with the conductor Henry Wood. In June 1925, Berly and the Pougnet quartet gave the first performance of Rossini's String quartet in G.

Berly played and broadcast with the Music Society String Quartet (later known as the International Quartet) with John Barbirolli, André Mangeot and Boris Pecker and the London Pianoforte Quartet also with Barbirolli, Samuel Kutcher (violin) and Ethel Bartlett (piano).

Berly appeared at the Proms in 1925 and 1926, at the Queen's Hall. He and Jean Pougnet on both occasions played Mozart's Sinfonia Concertante in E flat major for Violin and Viola with the Queen's Hall Orchestra conducted by Sir Henry Wood. The Musical Times critic noted that, "It was very well played by M. Jean Pougnet and Mr. Harry Berly respectively, both players being noteworthy for the beauty and purity of their tone."

In February 1926 he gave his first London recital at the Grotrian Hall. At the recital he performed, with the pianist Harry Isaacs, the complete Dale Suite op.2 and sonatas by Bax and Rebecca Clarke. In March 1926 he appeared at the Wigmore Hall with the Pougnet Quartet comprising Jean Pougnet (1st Violin), Hugo Ringold (2nd Violin), Berly on viola and Douglas Cameron (Cello).

Berly also played with the Laurance Turner String Quartet, with Walter Price (2nd violin) and Jack Shinebourne (cello), the Daventry Quartet and the Leslie Bridgewater Quintet.

In June 1935, Berly, Tertis and Charles Lynch (piano) gave the first performance of Tertis's Variations for two Violas on the Passacaglia from the seventh Suite of Handel at the Wigmore Hall in London. The Musical Times critic wrote of Berly's performance: "Berly, as first viola in the Handel-Tertis Variations, exhibited a virtuosity equal to every sort of brilliance and legerdemain".

=== Big Band ===
Berly was also an accomplished jazz musician and multi-instrumentalist and played with a number of British Big Bands in the 1930s, mainly on saxophone and clarinet. He played and recorded with Ray Noble and his New Mayfair Orchestra, the Roy Fox Band, Geoffrey Goodhart and his Orchestra, the Lew Stone Band, Jack Hylton(Berly was considered Jack Hylton's No.1 violinist), The Arthur Lally Band and Harry Smead's Dance Orchestra. Berly regularly performed with recording artists such as Al Bowlly and Nat Gonella.

Berly took his own life on 25 March 1937. He jumped in front of a train at Oval tube station.
