= Keith Cummings =

Australian violist and violinist (1906–1992)

- Born: Keith Edward Cummings; 30 August 1906; Perth, Australia
- Died: 13 December 1992 (aged 86) Hampstead, England
- Genre: Classical
- Occupations: Musician, professor
- Instruments: Violin, Viola

Keith Cummings (30 August 1906 – 13 December 1992) was an Australian violist and violinist who settled in England. He played with the Blech Quartet, the New London Quartet, the Hallé, the London Symphony Orchestra and the RAF Orchestra. He was professor of viola at Trinity College of Music.

== Early life and career in Australia ==
Keith Cummings was born in Perth, Australia, on 30 August 1906 to John Cummings, a decorator, and his wife Sarah McKeown. Cummings studied in Australia with Professor Joseph Nowotny (Note: Joseph Nowotny (1871 -1951) studied in Vienna, moving to Perth in 1906. He was Concertmaster of the Montreux-Vevey Symphony Orchestra in Switzerland and also taught Ronald Thoms, Horace Dean and Albert Lynch)

In Perth, Cummings, along with his older brother Eric (a pianist), were members of the 32nd Scout Troop and performed at several concerts in 1920 and 1921 which were recorded in the local Perth News.

As a youth, Cummings belonged to the Young Australia League (YAL) and toured with them around Australia. His fine playing was often commented upon in newspaper reviews of the period. The Bunbury Herald in September 1923, commented on the unstinted applause Cummings received for his interpretations of Dvořák's Humoresque and the Ave Maria (Intermezzo) from Cavalleria Rusticana. The South Western Times spoke of "his power in transmitting the poetic images of the mind into soul-stirring music". At the age of eighteen he accompanied the English contralto Dame Clara Butt.

By 1925 he had formed a string quartet, the Mace quartet, its name derived from the initials of the players' surnames – Morley (cello), Ashton (viola), Cummings (1st violin) and Edgar (2nd violin).

In 1927 Cummings received his Fellowship of Trinity College London (F.T.C.L.), the first diploma of its kind for violin-playing ever awarded in Western Australia.

In 1929, Cummings gave several recitals with his brother J. Eric Cummings as accompanist. In April 1930 he married the pianist Madge Price who was to accompany him in several concerts. In 1932, he was the deputy conductor of the Metropolitan Symphony Orchestral Society in Perth. In that same year, owing to the economic depression, Cummings left for the United Kingdom, to study with Henry Holst.

== Career in the UK ==
Cummings studied in the UK with Henry Holst at the Royal Manchester College of Music and later, in 1935, with Lionel Tertis at Tertis's home in Cheam. In 1932, Sir Hamilton Harty auditioned Cummings for a viola position at The Hallé Orchestra in Manchester, and Cummings played with the orchestra until 1936.

Cummings gave his first major recital, as a viola player, in Manchester, at the Memorial Hall, accompanied by Lucy Pierce, a piano professor at the RMCM. The concert received strong praise from a local critic who wrote: "…not even Tertis could have played the cadenza in the Bliss Viola Sonata better than Mr Cummings last night". In an extended notice in the Manchester Guardian the playing of the two artists was highly praised, particularly in the works of Bax and Bliss.

By 1933 Cummings was playing with the Hirsch String Quartet and also performed and broadcast on a number of occasions with the Henry Holst Quartet and the Charles Taylor String Quartet.

In 1936 Cummings moved to London having been offered a six-week engagement at Covent Garden with the London Symphony Orchestra. He played with the orchestra until 1941. In the summertime, Cummings would play with orchestras at coastal venues owing to the influx of holiday makers. In the summer of 1936, he played with the Whitby Municipal Orchestra at the Spa Pavilion under Frank Gomez. The following year, in October 1937, he performed at the Aeolian Hall in London with the pianist Lucy Pierce, in a sonata recital of Brahms, Honegger, Biber and Arnold Cooke. The Sonata for Viola and Piano by Cooke was written for Cummings. In December 1937, Cummings played and broadcast with the (Isidore) Schwiller String Sextet. Cummings joined the Boyd Neel Orchestra and was with them when they toured Portugal in 1939, performing in Lisbon, Oporto and Coimbra, the Coimbra concert being notable for the circus animals who shared the stage with the orchestra. In October 1939 he performed with the Gershom-Parkington Quintet.

During the Second World War Cummings was an enumerator for the distribution of ration books and identity cards. Cummings performed at the last season of the Promenade Concerts to take place at the Queen's Hall before its destruction by German bombing. In 1941, Cummings joined the Royal Air Force Orchestra. Whilst with the orchestra, he toured the United States of America in 1944/5, meeting Tibor Serly (who completed Bartók's Viola Concerto), Fritz Kreisler, Bronislaw Huberman and John Brownlee. The orchestra played during the Potsdam Conference in 1945. On his return from the tour, he discovered that his house in London had been damaged by a V2 rocket.

Both during and after the war Cummings played with the Blech String Quartet, with Harry Blech (violin), Max Salpeter (violin) and James Whitehead (cello).

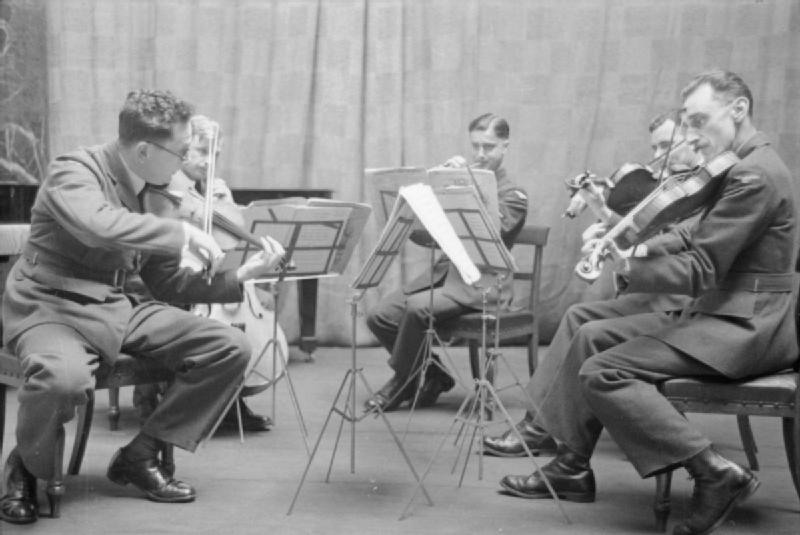
The Blech String Quartet playing Mozart's horn quintet in E-flat major, with Keith Cummings (far right) on viola, 1943

The Quartet gave a number of notable first performances including that of the Walton String Quartet, which received its first performance in a BBC studio and was broadcast live on the Third Programme on 4 May 1947. The following day the quartet received its first public performance, in the BBC's concert hall in Broadcasting House. The recording featured Harry Blech and Lionel Bentley on violin, Cummings on viola and Douglas Cameron on cello.

When Harry Blech left the quartet, Erich Gruenberg became the leader of the renamed New London String Quartet, (Carl Pini played 2nd violin) giving numerous concerts, including, the Brahms Piano Quintet with Benno Moiseiwitsch and a performance of the Schumann Piano Quintet at the Royal Festival Hall with Sir Malcolm Sargent. They gave the first performance of William Alwyn's String Quartet no. 1 in D minor at the Royal Festival Hall in May 1954, and gave the first broadcast performances of: Phyllis Tate's String Quartet in F on the BBC Third Programme in October 1953; Egon Wellesz's String Quartet No. 7, Op. 66 on the BBC Third Programme in July 1954; Dvorak's Quartet Movement in F on the BBC Third Programme in April 1956; Hilding Rosenberg's String Quartet No.4 on BBC Radio in May 1958, and Roy Harris's String Quartet No.3 on the BBC Third Progamme in August 1959.

Before an invited audience in the Concert Hall, Broadcasting House in December 1954, for the BBC World Service, the New London Quartet with Dennis Brain (Horn), Jack Brymer (Clarinet), and Archie Camden (Bassoon), performed Schubert's Octet in F op.166 (D.803).

In the 1950s, Cummings was a viola tutor for the newly formed (1948) National Youth Orchestra of Great Britain.

Cummings recorded with a number of solo artists including Victoria de los Ángeles, for her Five Centuries of Spanish Song LP, with an ensemble directed by José Maria Lamaña at Abbey Road Studios in June 1955.

In 1960 Cummings joined the professorial staff at Trinity College of Music. In that same year he received his Honorary Fellowship from the Royal Manchester College of Music, FRMCM.

From the 1960s Cummings was an adjudicator and examiner at the Royal Academy of Music.

Cummings played viola on the Beatles White Album for the songs Glass Onion and Piggies, recorded at Abbey Road Studios in 1968.

Cummings played on a 1757 Guadagnini viola, which Ernest Doring included in his book on the instruments of Guadagnini. He states: 1757 – A viola of very excellent acoustic properties is owned by Keith Cummings, of the Blech Quartet of London, which toured America with the Royal Air Force Band in 1945. The viola is currently owned by the Detroit Symphony Orchestra, and is played by their principal violist Eric Nowlin.

== Family ==
Cummings had three children, all musicians – Julian (violinist), Diana (violinist), and Douglas (cellist). The Cummings family, Keith and Madge, their children —Diana, Julian and Douglas (and Diana's husband Luciano Iorio), all of whom were students at the Royal Academy of Music —and their children, were featured in a half-hour programme entitled A Family Band, presented by Roy Castle, and shown on BBC 2 on 3 May 1982.

Keith Cummings died on 13 December 1992.

== References and sources ==
=== Sources ===
==== Books ====
- Kennedy, Michael (1971). The History of the Royal Manchester College of Music. Manchester University Press. p. 197. ISBN 0719004357.
- Townend, Peter (1962). Who's Who in Music. London: Burke's Peerage Ltd. p. 50.
- White, John (1997). An Anthology of British Viola Players. Colne, Lancashire: Comus Edition. pp. 71, 72. ISBN 095310690X.
