= Jean Pougnet =

British violinist and orchestra leader (1907 - 1968)

Jean Pougnet (20 July 1907 – 14 July 1968) was a Mauritian-born concert violinist and orchestra leader, of British nationality, who was highly regarded in both the lighter and more serious classical repertoire during the first half of the twentieth century. He was leader of the London Philharmonic Orchestra from 1942 to 1945.

== Origins and training ==
Jean Pougnet was born in Mauritius to British parents. His father held a civil service position there, and was an excellent amateur pianist who gave lessons. The family moved to England in 1909, when Jean was two. His musical ability was first recognised by his sister Marcelle, who gave him some violin lessons, and musical influences were also received from his elder brother René, a pianist. They happened to be near neighbours of the distinguished violin teacher Rowsby Woof, who took him on as a private pupil. In 1919 (aged 11) he won a scholarship to the Royal Academy of Music and studied there for seven years.

== Early career ==
Pougnet made his first public appearance in his twelfth year at King's Hall, Covent Garden, but his real break was a solo recital at the Wigmore Hall just before his sixteenth birthday, and his appearance soon afterwards at a Promenade concert. While he was still at the Academy he established a quartet. A Jean Pougnet Quartet appeared publicly at the Wigmore Hall in March 1926 to perform Beethoven's Quartet, Op. 18, No. 3, the Vaughan Williams Quartet in G minor, and the Ravel Quartet. The group consisted of Pougnet, Hugo Rignold as second violin (later a celebrated conductor), Harry Berly (a distinguished pupil of Lionel Tertis) as viola and Douglas Cameron (cello). At about this time he assisted the Music Society String Quartet (later called the International String Quartet), consisting of André Mangeot and Boris Pecker (violins), Harry Berly (viola) and John Barbirolli (cello), in recordings of the Purcell Fantasia in 5 parts (on one note) and the Vaughan Williams (1912) Phantasy Quintet for strings, for the National Gramophonic Society.

Like Hugo Rignold, for several years Jean Pougnet made his career in light orchestras and bands as well as through Wigmore Hall classical recitals. He made a virtue of this necessity, recognising its validity and challenges for the professional musician. Jack Hylton's orchestra was first augmented by the Pougnet String Quartette (with Eric Siday in place of Hugo Rignold) in early 1926 at the Kit-Kat Club. In October 1928 Jean Pougnet and his Orchestra (a Jack Hylton unit) were performing at the Green Park Hotel Piccadilly. In the period 1928–1930 he was a frequent player with the New Mayfair Orchestra, the His Master's Voice studio orchestra, under Carroll Gibbons or Ray Noble. Jean Pougnet and his Band were playing at the Berkeley Hotel Piccadilly in January to April 1930. In 1929 he married Frances Lois, of London; there were no children.

== Classical opportunities ==
As opportunity arose during the 1930s, Pougnet left the band scene to concentrate on recitals, concerti, chamber music, broadcasts, recordings, and work in film studios. His classical reputation in this period is shown in a preserved 'live' recording of the Mozart Sinfonia Concertante with Bernard Shore (principal viola of the BBC Symphony Orchestra) in a Queen's Hall Promenade concert of 8 September 1936, under Sir Henry Wood. Commercial recordings include Mozart's Rondo in C Major K.373 (Columbia DX769, in 1937) and Mozart's Adagio in E, K.261 (Columbia DX957, in 1939). Pougnet's String Trio, with William Primrose (viola) and Anthony Pini (cello), was broadcasting before the War. (Anthony Pini had recorded with the Pro Arte Quartet during the 1930s and he and Henry Holst were associated with Louis Kentner and Solomon in piano trio recordings during the early 1940s.) With Frederick Riddle replacing Primrose (permanently) at viola desk, Pougnet's trio recorded the E. J. Moeran (1931) String Trio in G major in May 1941. During the War he continued to tour as a soloist in the provinces, sometimes sharing the platform with Leon Goossens or Anthony Pini. In 1943 (6 November) he performed the Mozart Sinfonia Concertante with Maurice Ward (viola) under Sir Adrian Boult for the Royal Philharmonic Society.

At the outbreak of War, Pougnet was chosen to lead the BBC Salon Orchestra, which did much useful work for public morale until it was dissolved in 1942. At this point the London Philharmonic Orchestra, needing a replacement for its leader Thomas Matthews (and in the wake of the destruction of the Queen's Hall together with many of the orchestra's instruments in 1941), gave the position to Pougnet, 'a fastidious player of impeccable taste', though he had limited experience of performing symphonic music. The L.P.O., having close allegiance to Sir Thomas Beecham, had not until then been associated with the Promenade Concerts, but in 1942 Pougnet was immediately called upon to lead the orchestra through many large works in which he had not performed before, with minimal rehearsal, under the direction of Sir Henry Wood, Sir Adrian Boult and Basil Cameron. He met this extraordinary challenge brilliantly. The involvement with the Proms continued in 1943 and in 1944, Sir Henry Wood's Jubilee season. Pougnet having thus led the orchestra through the later years of the War he remained in the position until the end of 1945.

== Post-war: concert and recordings ==
His career uninterrupted, Pougnet took an important part in post-war music in Britain. Setting off on his solo career in December 1945, he made an impression with the Ernest Bloch violin concerto in a concert at Covent Garden, and gave the English premiere of a concerto by Richard Arnell. Other composers dedicated works to him. During the winter of 1946–1947 he perfected his interpretation of the Delius concerto with Sir Thomas Beecham, their performances at Croydon (27 October 1946) and at the Delius Festival, Royal Albert Hall (8 November 1946), and at the People's Palace in April 1947, spanning the Abbey Road Studios recording sessions of 31 October and 1 November 1946. The wartime recording of this work by Albert Sammons (said to have "the dumbfounding splendour of a sunset"), although preferred by some, was deleted when Pougnet's account was published and this became the standard recording for many years. He performed the concerto at a Prom concert in August 1951 with the LSO.

Many of Pougnet's recordings were made in the late 1940s and early 1950s, during the shift from 78 rpm to LP records, with the result that classic performances were often replaced by versions by other performers as the newer technology settled down, and have only recently become more widely available again. His recording of the Bach double concerto with Arthur Grumiaux (Philharmonia Orchestra under Walter Susskind) had a restricted life. The Pougnet, Riddle and Pini trio continued to broadcast, and recorded trios by Beethoven (several volumes), Haydn (op 53 nos 1, 2, and 3), Mozart Divertimento in E flat major K 563, and Dohnányi, Serenade op 10. Pini was meanwhile cellist of the fine Philharmonia Quartet with Henry Holst, Ernest Element and Herbert Downes. Pougnet and Riddle take the second fiddle and viola desks with Pini and Holst in the Philharmonia Quartet's recording of the Mozart 'Hunt' Quartet (No 17 in B flat major).

In the same period Pougnet made his famous recording of Ralph Vaughan Williams's The Lark Ascending (London Philharmonic Orchestra, Boult, 1952) and played the solo in the same company's recording of Jean Sibelius's En saga. His provincial work remained largely focused on southern England (he lived at various times in Ferring (West Sussex), and in Worthing), and until 1956 he led the Eastbourne Grand Hotel Palm Court Concerts. He remained in demand for performance and recordings of the most serious chamber music, associated with the Dolmetsch Ensemble, and recorded Leclair sonatas with Arnold Goldsbrough (harpsichord) and James Whitehead (gamba) for Volume VI of the History of Music in Sound project. His 1951 recording of the Dittersdorf concerto for violin, harpsichord and strings, was with Lionel Salter and the London Baroque Ensemble under Karl Haas.

He continued to work in ensemble with modern works, recording the Robert Still Quintet with Francisco Gabarró (cello), Geoffrey Gilbert, George Crozier and Lionel Solomon (flutes), the Darius Milhaud Little Symphony No 3, Op. 71 with Reginald Kell (clarinet), Paul Draper (bassoon), George Eskdale (trumpet) and Anthony Pini under Walter Goehr, and in April 1955 broadcasting the (1950) Flute Trio in A minor of Harold Truscott on the BBC. He also appears in a recording of the Ravel Septet, and he recorded suites by Bartók with the New Symphony Orchestra under Franco Autori.

== Late troubles ==
A promising development began when Pougnet formed a trio with Wilfrid Parry (piano) and Dennis Brain (horn), which toured Scotland twice. The group planned in 1957 to tour Australia, but these arrangements were terminated by the death of Dennis Brain in a car accident at the end of 1957. Late in life Pougnet suffered a succession of misfortunes. As early as 1946 he had been noted for his enthusiasm for D.I.Y. Sometime later while so engaged he injured his arm tendons and was compelled to stop playing. After a long period of retirement he trained his fingers to play again and began to perform, but very soon afterwards he was diagnosed with cancer, which slowly killed him.

In his later years he lived in Worthing and taught the violin in schools across West Sussex. He was a founder of the West Sussex County Youth Orchestra and was their conductor for many years. His recording of the Delius Violin Concerto was played at his funeral.

Pougnet played an instrument by Januarius Gagliano.
