= Sydney Errington =

British violist (1905 - 1980)

- Born: Charles Sydney Errington; 3 September 1905; Leeds, England
- Died: 23 October 1980 (aged 75) Leeds Yorkshire
- Genres: Classical
- Occupations: Musician, Professor
- Instruments: Violin, Viola

Sydney Errington (September 3, 1905 – October 23, 1980) was a British violist from Leeds, Yorkshire. He played with the Hallé Orchestra from 1928 to 1970. He was a pupil of Lionel Tertis, and performed with many ensembles including the Turner Quartet and Hirsch Quartet. He introduced many new works to northern English audiences, such as the viola works of Arnold Bax and Paul Hindemith.

== Biography ==
Charles Sydney Errington was born in Leeds on 3 September 1905 to Joseph John Errington, a confectioner, and his wife Mary Jane Westbeare.

Errington was a boy chorister at All Soul's Church in Leeds and played the violin at Leeds Central High School, where he was a founder member of the orchestra and later its leader and secretary. He studied violin with Alfred Barker and Carl Fuchs and made his first public appearance in April 1916, on the violin. He went to the Leeds College of Music when he started to play the viola. He led a string quartet which won first prize at the Leeds Competitive Music Festival in 1924. Errington also won the viola prize that day and was presented with an award for the most artistic playing of the festival by the then leader of the London Symphony Orchestra, William Henry Reed.

In 1925, the year he began broadcasting on the BBC, he joined the Leeds Symphony Orchestra, (a professional orchestra, later known as the Northern Philharmonic Orchestra), on the invitation of the violinist and leader, Edward Maude, and later joined the Hallé Orchestra in 1928.He remained at the Hallé Orchestra for the rest of his playing career and won the Twenty Years Service Medal and the Hallé Orchestra Long Service Medal for 42 years of service to the orchestra. Errington also played with the XXV String Orchestra in Leeds, conducted by James Chalmers Park.

From 1930, Errington was a viola professor at the Northern School of Music in Manchester.Among his many pupils was the violist Brian Hawkins, who played with the London Virtuosi, the Gagliano Trio, and was a professor of viola at the Royal College of Music, London.

Errington played Mozart's Sinfonia Concertante on several occasions with the leader of the Hallé Orchestra Alfred Barker and he performed the work with Reginald Stead, (leader of the BBC Northern Orchestra), and the William Rees Orchestra at the Milton Hall in Manchester in 1939.

Errington played with a number of string quartets throughout his career. In 1932, Errington was playing second violin, with the long-established Ernest Romaine O'Malley String Quartet from Blackburn and the Yorkshire String Quartet, led by Norman Rouse. The quartets were composed of players from the Hallé Orchestra. Errington played in, and made several broadcasts with, the Holst Quartet, formed in 1931, with Henry Holst, Reginald Stead, and Leonard Baker, broadcasting with them in 1939 and 1940. He played with and made several broadcasts with the Hirsch quartet, alongside Leonard Hirsch, Reginald Stead and Haydn Rogerson. The Hirsch quartet, with Leonard Baker on cello, performed at the Aeolian Hall in London in 1934. Errington also played with Deira Quartet, formed in 1932, (the name derived from a Celtic word describing land between the Tees and the Humber) comprising Edward Maude (violin), Norman Elwin (violin), Sydney Errington (viola) and Arthur Haynes (cello). Errington also performed with the Laurance Turner String Quartet. In 1934, Errington played with the English Quartet, comprising Alfred Barker, Thomas Matthews and Stuart Knussen.

In 1932, Errington brought the viola works of Arnold Bax to Northern audiences with a performance of Bax's Sonata for Viola and Piano, with Edgar Knight at the piano. At the time he stated: I am very keen on Arnold Bax and I believe this sonata to be a really great work. He repeated the work the following year.

At a radio broadcast from Leeds University in October 1933, Errington accompanied the English contralto Mary Jarred in Two songs for contralto with viola obbligato, op.91 by Brahms. He also performed Benjamin Dale's Fantasy for Viola and Piano with the pianist Edward Allam.

He began studying the viola with the legendary Lionel Tertis in 1934, travelling to Surrey for his lessons. Errington recounts that at his first lesson with Tertis, which concluded with a walk on the Downs and dinner, Tertis said: Well, you make quite a pleasant sound but it's all 'flautando' - you must work for your sound, don't sound like a poor fiddler. Errington was known as The Tertis of the North.

As viola principal of the Hallé, Errington played under the baton of many noted conductors such as Hamilton Harty, Leslie Heward, John Barbirolli, Malcolm Sargent and Sir Thomas Beecham.

In 1939, he married Barbara Mary Maude the daughter of Edward Maude, leader of the Leeds Symphony Orchestra. Barbara was an accomplished amateur cellist who played with the Harrogate String Orchestra.

During the war, Errington made brass fuse parts for the Royal Navy and worked as an ambulance driver, resuming his post with the Hallé after the war ended.

In January 1940 Errington organised a series of chamber music concerts at the Philosophical Hall in Leeds, a venue which was later bombed in March 1941. The tickets for these concerts were sold at a cheap rate to enable students to hear chamber music.

At a Hallé concert in March 1955, Errington's viola playing of the solo in Edward Elgar's overture In the South, was picked out by the critic of the Manchester News as being exquisite and the highlight of the piece.

In 1958 he performed Strauss's Don Quixote with the principal cellist of the Hallé, Oliver Vella, at the Free Trade Hall in Manchester, followed by repeat performances in Bradford and Sheffield.

Errington often performed with Sir John Barbirolli and his wife, the oboist Evelyn Rothwell, and other members of the Hallé at the King's Lynn Festival. At a chamber music concert for charity at Bramham Park, Yorkshire, in July 1962, Errington played with Sir John Barbirolli (cello), Lady Fermoy (piano), Martin Milner (violin) and Joseph Segal (violin). They titled their chamber group The King's Lynn Festival Ensemble, repeating their concert at the King's Lynn Festival later in the summer.

Errington played Berlioz's Harold in Italy with the Hallé Orchestra on several occasions, performing the work in 1967 with John Barbirolli, in Manchester's Free Trade Hall.

In 1938 Errington was fined £2 for exceeding the speed limit. He was on his way to a rehearsal in Manchester where the violinist Fritz Kreisler was present.

Errington retired from the Hallé in 1970 owing to ill health and died at his home in Leeds in 1980. In 1970, Barbirolli, on hearing that Errington would not be able to play in a concert where Elgar's In the South was to be performed, and he had set his heart on Errington to play the solo viola passage, said: I cannot bear to think of you not playing that, because as I studied it, I could see your fingerings, your vibrato and your bowing arm. On Good Friday, 27 March 1970, in the last year of Sir John Barbirolli's life, Barbirolli gave a dinner party in Manchester for the ten Hallé players who had played over five thousand concerts under his regime. Errington was one of the ten players invited.

Errington played on a Jacob Rayman viola from 1650 for his solo performances. This viola was sold by Sotheby's in 1981 shortly after his death.

Errington also played a Lionel Tertis Model (Cocker) viola from 1943.

His name is remembered in the Musicians' Book of Remembrance in the Musician's Chapel within the Church of the Holy Sepulchre, (The Musicians' Church) in London.

== References and sources ==
=== Sources ===
==== Books ====
- Atkins, Harold (1983). The Barbirollis, a Musical Marriage. Robson Books, London. p. 158.
- Kennedy, Michael (1971). Barbirolli, conductor laureate; the authorised biography. London: MacGibbon & Kee. pp. 317, 330. ISBN 9781855800298.
- Riley, Maurice W. (1980). The History of the Viola. Michigan, U.S.A: Braun-Brumfield, Ann Arbor. p. 241. ISBN 0960315004.
- Tertis, Lionel (1974). My Viola and I. Elek Books, London. p. 138. ISBN 0236310402.
- Townend, Peter (1962). Who's Who in Music. London: Burke’s Peerage Ltd. p. 67.
- White, John (1997). An Anthology of British Viola Players. Colne, Lancashire: Comus Edition. pp. 91, 92. ISBN 095310690X.
- White, John (2006). Lionel Tertis – The First Great Virtuoso of the Viola. The Boydell Press. p. 250. ISBN 9781843832782.
