= Hope Hambourg =

British violist (1902 - 1989)

- Born: Margaret Hope Timpson; 5 October 1902; Kettering, Northamptonshire, England
- Died: 28 September 1989 (aged 86) Looe, Cornwall, England
- Genres: Classical
- Occupation: Musician
- Instruments: Viola

Hope Hambourg née Timpson (October 5, 1902 – September 28, 1989) was a British violist. She played with a number of ensembles in the early half of the twentieth century. She was a pupil of Lionel Tertis. With Jean Le Fèvre and Ruth Dyson she played viola in the Le Fèvre Trio.

== Early life and education ==
Margaret Hope Timpson was born in Kettering, Northampton, on 5 October 1902 to William and Katherine Timpson. Her father, William Timpson was the founder of the Timpson shoemaking firm. She was educated at Queenswood School and studied violin with Arthur Catterall, and later viola with Lionel Tertis at the Royal Academy of Music.

== Career ==
In the 1930s, Timpson performed at the Wigmore Hall with the pianist Kathleen Cooper and played with the Leicester Symphony Orchestra, under Malcolm Sargent.

Hambourg played in a number of ensembles, performing regularly with the Le Fèvre String Quartet, Maddison Trio and Quartet, Richards Piano Quartet, Pearl String Quartet, Marie Wilson Quartet and the Kettering String Quartet and Quintette.

In 1940 she married Charles Hambourg, cousin of Russian pianist Mark Hambourg. Charles was a cellist and conductor who, like Hambourg, had studied at the Royal Academy of Music.

In December 1950, Lionel Tertis arranged a concert at the Wigmore Hall in London to demonstrate his Tertis Model Viola. Hambourg was one of a small group of violists who were asked to perform, alongside William Primrose.

Hambourg was a member of the Society of Women Musicians and during the war years was a member of the Council for the Encouragement of Music and the Arts (CEMA), and the Entertainments National Service Association (ENSA).

Hambourg played on an Amati viola which was sold at Sotheby's in 1981 to fund the Hope Hambourg Music Trust, an organisation set up by her cousin, pianist Michal Hambourg.

Hambourg died at the age of 86 in Cornwall, where she had moved with her husband in 1972.
