= Rucinski =

Rucinski or Ruciński (feminine: Rucińska; plural: Rucińscy) is a Polish surname. Notable people with the name include:

- Andrzej Ruciński (born 1958), Polish politician
- Artur Ruciński (born 1976), Polish operatic baritone singer
- Drew Rucinski (born 1988), American baseball pitcher
- Eddie Rucinski (1916–1995), American football player
- Łucja Rucińska (1817–1882), Polish composer
- Mike Rucinski (born 1963), American ice hockey center
- Mike Rucinski (born 1975), American ice hockey player
