= Maurice Ward (musician) =

English violist (1899–1957)

- Born: Maurice Ward; 30 November 1899; Shipley, Yorkshire, England
- Died: 20 February 1957 (aged 57) London, England
- Genres: Classical
- Occupation: Musician
- Instruments: Viola, Violin
- Formerly of: London Philharmonic Orchestra, Covent Garden Opera Orchestra, The Hallé Orchestra.

Maurice Ward (1899–1957) was a British violist and violinist. He was principal violist with the London Philharmonic Orchestra and the Covent Garden Opera Orchestra, and was a violinist and violist with The Hallé Orchestra.

== Life ==
Maurice Ward was born in Shipley, Yorkshire on 30 November 1899. His father Ernest was an accountant and his grandfather Thomas Ward was a professor of music and a draper. His mother Blanche Ethel Boyes was the daughter of the painter William Joseph Boyes. His sister Margaret was a violinist who played with the Liverpool Philharmonic Society Orchestra and the William Rees Orchestra.

== Career ==
Little is known of his early musical studies, as the family moved to Canada in 1913. They returned to England in the late 1910s when Maurice joined the Royal Manchester College of Music (RMCM), studying violin with Adolph Brodsky and graduating in 1923. Upon leaving the RMCM he played violin with The Hallé Orchestra and played with a number of string quartets, most notably the Leonard Hirsch Quartet, the Catterall Quartet, and the 2ZY String Quartet, (later titled the Hyden String Quartet), and the Edith Robinson Quartet. He also played viola with these quartets and took viola lessons with the distinguished violist Lionel Tertis.

At the Free Trade Hall in Manchester in 1932, Ward played Richard Strauss's symphonic poem for 'cello, viola and orchestra, Don Quixote (Op.35) with Stuart Knussen and The Hallé, conducted by Hamilton Harty. After Harty's death in 1941 Ward wrote an appreciation of him in the London Philharmonic Post.

In 1932, with Sir Thomas Beecham, he helped found the London Philharmonic Orchestra.

At the BBC Proms in July 1942, Ward played the obbligato part to Henry Wood's arrangement of the aria, Stein, der über alle Schätze (Stone, Above All Others Treasured) from Bach's Cantata No. 152, Tritt auf die Glaubensbahn, (BWV 152). Elsie Suddaby was the vocal soloist, with Henry Wood conducting.

In November 1943, Ward performed Mozart's Sinfonia Concertante with the violinist Jean Pougnet, accompanied by the Royal Philharmonic Society Orchestra under Sir Adrian Boult. Also in November 1943, at Wolverhampton Civic Hall, Ward performed a new Sonatina for Viola and Piano, specially written for him by his friend, the composer Thomas Baron Pitfield. Frank Merrick, a former tutor of Ward at the RMCM, was the pianist.

In 1953 he was selected by Sir Adrian Boult to play in the orchestra for the Coronation of Elizabeth II.

He died on 20 February 1957, the 10th anniversary of his marriage to his second wife, having collapsed at a rehearsal at the Royal Opera House.

Ward appeared in the 1943 film Battle for Music (directed by Donald Taylor). The film is set in the year 1939 and highlights the struggle the London Philharmonic Orchestra was going through to make ends meet. Following a meeting of creditors of the LPO, the players form a new company and arrange bookings themselves. In the film, in a response to Thomas Russell of the orchestral committee, when Russell (later to become manager of the LPO) is suggesting a tour to raise funds, Ward says: I hope it does come off Tom. We're not impatient but we haven't earned a cent for months. And we can't live on air – at least I can't. We know you members of the committee can't work miracles and we'll stick to the bitter end, but it’s a wise man who knows when it is the end.
