= Leavins =

Leavins is a surname. Notable people with the surname include:

- Arthur Leavins (1917–1995), British violinist
- Chris Leavins (born 1968), Canadian actor and writer
- Jim Leavins (born 1960), Canadian ice hockey player
