= National Gramophonic Society =

The National Gramophonic Society (NGS) was founded in England in 1923 by the novelist Compton Mackenzie to produce recordings of music which was ignored by commercial record companies. The society was proposed shortly after Mackenzie had launched his monthly The Gramophone (still in publication today as Gramophone), and its activities were announced and its releases promoted in the magazine's pages.

The NGS was established for the publication by subscription of classical music, recorded complete and uncut. The Society's Advisory Committee, responsible for devising the recording programme and passing test pressings, consisted of Walter Willson Cobbett, Edwin Spencer Dyke (leader of a string quartet), Gramophone contributors W. R. Anderson, Alec Robertson and Peter Latham, and the magazine's Editors Compton Mackenzie and Christopher Stone, who was also NGS Secretary.

Cobbett (born 1847), a lover and amateur performer of chamber music, had founded the Cobbett Competition in 1905 for a short form of string quartet composition or 'Phantasy', and for other short chamber works, prizes won variously by William Yeates Hurlstone (1876-1906, pianist) (1905), Frank Bridge (1908), John Ireland (1909), J. Cliffe Forrester (1916), Harry Waldo Warner (viola of the London Quartet) (1916), York Bowen (1918) and Cecil Armstrong Gibbs (1919). In 1921 he was offering further awards to Royal Academy and Royal College of Music graduates, and commissioned many new chamber works from English composers. Cobbett led his own string quartet in two productions for the NGS, which he paid for himself, but beyond this his involvement in its activities was minimal.

The society's productions were almost all recorded premieres. Issued on 10-inch and 12-inch 78 rpm and 80 rpm discs with distinctive yellow labels, they included the first-ever recordings of familiar works such as the C major string quintet of Schubert and Brahms's clarinet quintet, along with music then relatively little known by composers such as Henry Purcell, Vivaldi and even Mozart.

The NGS's repertoire consisted largely of chamber music, but included some works for small orchestra and a few vocal items.

The society recorded works by several living composers, such as Ralph Vaughan Williams, Arnold Bax, Peter Warlock (first recording of The Curlew), Eugene Goossens, Arnold Schoenberg (original sextet version of Verklärte Nacht) and Sir Edward Elgar.

The most prolific NGS recording artists were three string quartets: the Spencer Dyke String Quartet and André Mangeot's Music Society String Quartet and International String Quartet. Well-known musicians who also recorded for the Society included John Barbirolli (as both cellist and conductor), the clarinettists Charles Draper and Frederick Thurston, the oboist Leon Goossens, the violinist Adila Fachiri, and the pianists Donald Francis Tovey, Harold Craxton, Kathleen Long, and Bartlett and Robertson.

The society had members in Britain and all over the world, mainly in the British Empire and the US. They were invited to vote on each season's recording programme, devised by the advisory committee.

The NGS ceased production in 1931, mainly as a result of financial difficulties faced by Gramophone (Publications) Ltd., and partly because the commercial record companies, in particular EMI with its own Society issues overseen by Walter Legge, had begun to take on the role of recording similar repertoire, so that the Society was seen as no longer necessary. But NGS records remained available for sale after this, some until the 1950s.

In 2006, the then-editor of Gramophone magazine, James Jolly, contacted audio restoration engineer Andrew Rose of Pristine Audio with a proposal to transfer and remaster the entire NGS collection of 78s still held in Gramophone's collection. The discs were transcribed by Rose in 2006 and a rolling programme of remastering and issuing the results as downloads began at the Pristine Classical website in March 2008. By coincidence, that same spring the historian and discographer Frank Andrews reached the NGS in his series of articles on small British record labels in the journal of the City of London Phonograph and Gramophone Society. This was followed by an article by Jolly, now Editor in Chief, in the June 2008 issue of Gramophone magazine, and another by Nick Morgan in the Summer 2008 issue of Classic Record Collector. There is also a short account of the NGS by Malcolm Walker in Gramophone's 1998 anniversary volume.

In July 2013, the University of Sheffield awarded Nick Morgan a PhD for his thesis on the NGS, consisting of a detailed study of its background, history, administration, activities, record production, marketing and distribution, printed publications, members and reception in Britain, with a complete discography and other documentary appendices. In January 2016, Classical Recordings Quarterly Editions of Sheffield published the thesis in its series 'Studies in the History of Recording'.
