= Spencer Dyke Quartet =

The Spencer Dyke Quartet was a string quartet active in England through the 1920s. It was formed in 1918 and its personnel remained unchanged until August 1927 when Bernard Shore became the violist and Tate Gilder the second violin. It is best remembered now for a series of pioneering chamber music recordings made for the National Gramophonic Society. At the time of the recordings, the Quartet members were Edwin Spencer Dyke (1st violin), Edwin Quaife (2nd violin), Ernest Tomlinson (viola) and Bertie Patterson Parker cello. Bernard Shore played viola in the last two recordings only.

== Origins ==
Spencer Dyke was a Cornish violinist, having been born at St Austell on 22 July 1880. He won the Dove Scholarship at the Royal Academy of Music in London at the age of 17, and became a professor there in 1907. He was mainly concerned with chamber music, teaching and editing. By 1924 he had written violin pieces and studies, had published editions of the classics and a book of scales. In October 1923, Compton Mackenzie founded the National Gramophonic Society for the recording and publication by subscription of classical music, principally chamber music, which was of limited circulation. The Spencer Dyke Quartet was by then already well-known: Spencer Dyke joined the advisory board for the selection of material for the Society, together with Walter Willson Cobbett, and others. Cobbett had founded the Cobbett Competition in 1905 for a short form of String Quartet composition or 'Phantasy', and for other short chamber works. The Society was intended to develop the taste for modern chamber music. The Spencer Dyke Quartet, together with various other instrumentalists in ensemble, appeared on many of the recordings, and his position on the committee therefore probably signified the original intention of the founders to employ his musicians for the project.

== Recordings ==
(Including related ensemble recordings)

- Frank Bridge 3 Noveletten, nos 1 and 3 (Vocalion D02155: 2 sides)
- Dvořák String Quartet in F major op 96 (Vocalion K05132,K05133,K03154: 6 sides)
- Haydn String Quartet in D major op 64 no 5 (Vocalion X9554,X9555,X9556: 6 sides)
- McEwen Suite of Old National Dances (String Quartet no 12) (Vocalion R6140: 2 sides)
- Beethoven: String Quartet in E flat major op 74 'Harp' (NGS A,B,C: 6 sides)
- Debussy: String Quartet in G minor op 10 (NGS D,E,F: 6 sides)
- Schubert: Piano Trio in E flat major D 929 (Dyke and Parker with Harold Craxton, piano) (NGS H,J,K,L,M+: 9 sides)
- Schoenberg: Verklärte Nacht op 4 (string sextet version), with James Lockyer, viola and E.J. Robinson, cello (NGS M-,N,O,P: 7 sides)
- Mozart: Oboe Quartet in F major K 370, with Leon Goossens, oboe (NGS: Q,R,S+: 5 sides)
- Bach: Cantata no 156, (i) Sinfonia, with Leon Goossens, oboe (NGS: S-, one side)
- Beethoven: String Quartet in F major op 59 no 1 (NGS T,V,W,X,Y: 10 sides)
- Brahms: String Sextet no 1 in B flat major op 18, with J. Lockyer and E.J. Robinson (NGS Z,AA,BB,CC,DD+: 9 sides)
- Tomlinson: A Lament (NGS EE+: 1 side)
- Elgar: Piano Quintet in A minor op 84, with Ethel Hobday, piano (NGS NN,OO,PP,QQ,RR: 10 sides)
- Brahms: Clarinet Quintet in b minor op 115, with Frederick Thurston, clarinet (NGS SS,TT,UU,VV,WW+: 9 sides)
- Glière: String Quartet in A major op 2, (ii) Scherzo (NGS WW-: 1 side)
- Mozart: Clarinet Quintet in A major K 581, with Charles Draper, clarinet (NGS XX,YY,ZZ,AAA+: 7 sides)
- Mozart: Duo no 1 in G major K 423, (ii) Adagio (Dyke-Tomlinson) (NGS AAA-: 1 side)
- Schubert: String Quartet no 13 in A minor D 804 (NGS HHH,JJJ,KKK,LLL,MMM+: 9 sides)
- Mendelssohn: String Quartet in e minor op 44 no 2, (ii) Scherzo (NGS MMM-: 1 side)
- Beethoven: String Quartet no 16 in F major op 135 (NGS NNN,OOO,PPP: 6 sides)
- Dvořák: Piano Quintet in A major op 81 with Ethel Bartlett, piano (NGS 82,83,84,85,86+: 9 sides)
- Joseph Speaight: Some Shakespeare Fairy Characters (1st series), no 2, 'The Lonely Shepherd' (NGS 86-: 1 side)
- Brahms: Piano Quartet in C minor op 60, with Olive Bloom (and Bernard Shore, viola) (NGS 88,89,90,91: 8 sides)
- Brahms: String Sextet no 2 in G major op 36, with J. Lockyer and E.J. Robinson (NGS 105,106,107,108: 8 sides)

== Sources ==
- A. Eaglefield-Hull, A Dictionary of Modern Music and Musicians (Dent, London 1924)
- R.D. Darrell, The Gramophone Shop Encyclopedia of Recorded Music (New York 1936)
- Frank Andrews, Keith Harrison, Tim Wood-Woolley, Vocalion Records (City of London Phonograph and Gramophone Society Reference Series RS42, 2017)
- N.T. Morgan, The National Gramophonic Society (Sheffield 2013 & 2016)

== See also ==
- Ronald Russell, Discography of the National Gramophonic Society
