= Harry Isaacs =

Harry Isaacs may refer to:

- Harry Isaacs (pianist) (1902–1972), British pianist
- Harry Z. Isaacs (1904–1990), American racehorse owner
- Harry Isaacs (boxer) (1908–1961), South African boxer who competed in the 1928 Summer Olympics in Amsterdam
- Harry Isaacs (1893–1958), British Jewish boxer who fought under the name Harry Reeve
