= Gilbert Shufflebotham =

- Birth name: Gilbert Shufflebotham
- Born: 6 May 1907; Horton, Staffordshire, England
- Died: 5 March 1978 (aged 70); Ripon, North Yorkshire, England
- Genres: Classical
- Occupation: Musician
- Instruments: Viola

Gilbert Shufflebotham (1907–1978) was a British violist and violinist. He studied at the Royal Manchester College of Music. He started his playing career on the violin, performing for radio broadcasts in the 1920s.

He was principal violist of the City of Birmingham Symphony Orchestra and played in the Hallé Orchestra, the Birmingham String Quartet, the Birmingham Ensemble Players as well as a number of other ensembles. He was a pupil of Lionel Tertis.

In 1947 he gave the CBSO's first performance of Mozart's Sinfonia Concertante with the orchestra's deputy leader and Element Quartet violist, Dorothy Hemming. He performed the work again in 1950 with the CBSO and Norris Stanley, with George Weldon conducting.

In February 1948, he performed William Walton's Viola Concerto with the Birmingham Symphony Orchestra.

Shufflebotham was the Head of Music at Ripon Grammar School. He founded and conducted the award-winning Knypersley String Orchestra and conducted the Ripon Schools' String Orchestra.
