= Douglas Cummings =

British cellist

Douglas Cummings (1946 – 14 May 2014) was a British cellist. His father was the Perth-born violist Keith Cummings.

Cummings studied at the Royal Academy of Music (RAM), and was also a student of Gregor Piatigorsky. He became principal cellist of the London Symphony Orchestra (LSO) in 1969 and held the post for 24 years, until 1993. He also served as a member of the LSO board of directors. After his departure from the LSO, Cummings taught at the RAM, the Royal Welsh College of Music & Drama and the Oundle School. He was a founder member of the London Virtuosi Chamber Ensemble. He was also a founder member of the Cummings String Quartet together with his sister Diana Cummings.

His recordings include the 2004 album The British Cello Phenomenon. He also performed and recorded with the Lindsay String Quartet.
