= Harry Isaacs (pianist) =

British pianist

Harry Isaacs (3 June 1902 – 1972) was a British pianist. Born in Finchley, he began piano lessons with his great-aunt, Miss Selina Pyke, from the age of seven, and three years later he took lessons from Sidney Rosenbloom. In 1916 he entered the Tobias Matthay Pianoforte School, studying with Hedwig McEwen (wife of John Blackwood McEwen). The following year he won the MacFarren Scholarship for composition at the Royal Academy of Music, and went there to study composition with Frederick Corder. He became pianoforte professor there in 1922 at the age of 20.

Isaacs had an absorbing interest in chamber music, and from 1929 until 1943 often played with the Griller String Quartet, performing quintets by Brahms, Schumann, Dvorak, Elgar, Bax and Bloch. He also performed many recitals at the Wigmore Hall with members of the Griller, and with Jean Pougnet, William Primrose, Lionel Tertis, Elsie Owen (violin), Winifred Copperwheat, Maurice Eisenberg, Douglas Cameron (cello) and others. During the 1930s Isaacs also performed as a duo with fellow RAM pianist York Bowen, a partnership that lasted until Bowen's death in 1961.

The Harry Isaacs Trio, formed in 1942, consisted of Isaacs with Leonard Hirsch (violin) and Norina Semino (cello). James Whitehead and Vivian Joseph also took the cello chair in the Trio. The Trio commissioned York Bowen to compose his Trio in E minor op. 118, first given at the Wigmore Hall on April 4, 1946. Arnold Bax also wrote his final chamber work, the Piano Trio in B flat, for the Isaacs Trio, who performed it at the Wigmore Hall on 21 March 1946.

Isaacs also worked as an examiner for the Associated Board of Music. During the war he was a full time air-raid warden. In the 1950s and into the 1960s he continued performing chamber music, including performances with the violinist Ralph Holmes. With Dennis Brain he premiered Peter Racine Fricker's Horn Sonata, Op 24 at the Conway Hall, on 20 March 1955.
