= Juliusz Zarębski =

Polish musician

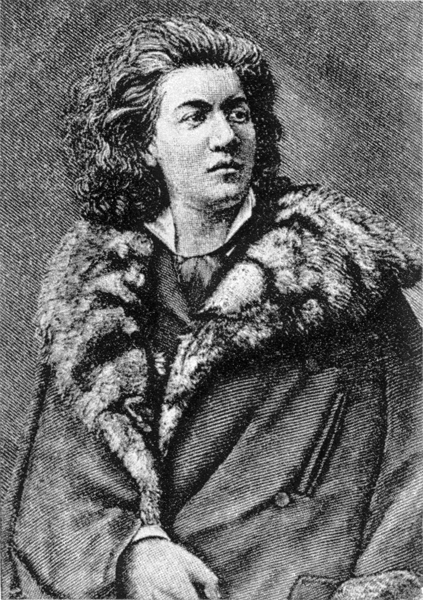

Background information
- Born: 3 March 1854; Zhytomyr
- Died: 15 September 1885 (aged 31) Zhytomyr
- Genre: Classical
- Occupation: Composer Pianist
- Instrument: Piano

Juliusz Zarębski (3 March 1854 – 15 September 1885) was a Polish composer and pianist active in the Russian Empire. Some of his manuscripts have been found in the National Library of Poland (BN).

== Life ==
Juliusz Zarębski was born on March 3, 1854, in Zhytomyr, (now Ukraine; then former lands of the Polish–Lithuanian Commonwealth and the Polish Kingdom). He would die in the same city in 1885.

His mother was his first piano teacher. Later, he studied with Lucja Rucinska. In 1870, he completed his education at the gymnasium with honors and moved to Vienna to study composition with Franz Krenn and piano with Josef Dachs. Two years later, he graduated with two gold medals, even though his curriculum indicated a musical training of six years. The following year he moved to St. Petersburg and studied there for three more years, passed his examination and obtained his diploma of "free artist." A year later, he moved to Rome and stayed there until 1875. In Rome, he studied piano with Franz Liszt, his friend for some time. The Hungarian composer, who would orchestrate his Danses Galiciennes in 1881, greatly helped Zarębski, appearing with him in concerts and using his contacts to publicize the works of the Polish composer.

After the crowning triumph of his public career with a successful performance at the Grand Exhibition of Paris, 1878, of the duo-keyboarded piano, he assumed a professorship of piano at the Royal Conservatory in Brussels, but the progress of tuberculosis curtailed his public performances after 1883 before his death in Ukraine, in 1885, at the age of 31.

Zarębski's compositions evoke those of Liszt and Chopin. He set to music the writings of Adam Mickiewicz and Włodzimierz Wolski.

== Career ==
His career as a virtuoso pianist began in spring 1874 with concerts in Odessa and Kiev. His performances in Rome, Naples, Constantinople, Warsaw, Paris, London and other European cities were a great success. He was interested in the two piano keyboards, a new invention of Edouard Mangeot, which in two months mastered. He developed his repertoire in this new instrument and performed on it with great acclaim in the 1878 Paris Exhibition. He established himself in Brussels, where he served as teacher of piano master classes at the Royal Conservatory. Two years before his death he had to put an end to his career as a virtuoso as he was diagnosed with tuberculosis, throwing himself into teaching (he had been appointed professor at the Royal Conservatory of Brussels in 1880) and composing pieces such as the five movements of Les roses et les épines based on a more advanced harmony. Though he continued composing nearly exclusively for the piano, the summit of his output would be his cyclical Piano Quintet in G minor of 1885.

== Compositions for piano ==
The parenthetical remarks indicate place and date of publication. "BN" indicates an unpublished manuscript found in the National Library of Poland.

- Andante ma non troppo, (BN)
- Romance sans paroles, in F minor, ca. 1870, (BN)
- Adieu, in F minor, ca. 1870, (BN)
- Maria, Piano 4-hands, 1871, (BN)
- March, pf 4 hands, 1875
- Grande fantaisie, 1876
- Menuet, Op. 1, 3 danses galiciennes, piano 4-hands, Op. 2 (Berlin 1880)
- Concert étude, in G major, Op. 3 (Berlin 1879)
- 4 Mazurkas, pf 4 hands, Op. 4 (Berlin 1880)
- 2 morceaux en forme de mazurka, piano 4-hands, Op. 5 (Berlin 1881)
- Grande polonaise, in F♯ major, Op. 6 (Berlin 1881)
- 3 études de concert, Op. 7 (Mainz 1881)
- Concert-mazurka, in C minor, Op. 8 (Mainz 1882)
- Fantaisie polonaise, Op. 9, ca. 1877 (Mainz 1882)
- Polonaise mélancolique, Op. 10 (Mainz 1882)
- Polonaise triomphale, Piano 4-hands, Op. 11 (Mainz 1882)
- Divertissement à la polonaise, Piano 4-hands, Op. 12 (Mainz 1883)
- Les roses et les épines, Op. 13 (Mainz 1883)
- Impromptu-caprice, Op. 14 (Leipzig 1883)
- Mazurka de concert, No.2, G minor, Op. 15 (Leipzig 1883)
- Suite polonaise, Op. 16 (Leipzig 1883)
- Valse sentimentale, Op. 17 (Leipzig 1884)
- Ballade, in G minor, Op. 18 (Breslau 1884)
- Novellette-caprice, Op. 19 (Breslau 1884)
- Sérénade burlesque, Op. 20 (Breslau 1884)
- Berceuse, Op. 22 (Leipzig 1884)
- A travers Pologne, Piano 4-hands, Op. 23 (Breslau 1884)
- Valse-caprice, Op. 24 (Leipzig 1884)
- Tarantelle, Op. 25 (Leipzig 1885?)
- Sérénade espagnole, Op. 26 (Leipzig 1883)
- Etrennes, Op. 27 (Breslau 1885)
- Polonaise, Op. 28 (Leipzig 1885)
- Gavotte, Op. 29 (Leipzig 1885)
- Valse, Op. 30 (Leipzig 1885)
- Barcarolle, Op. 31 (Leipzig 1885)
- Menuet, Op. 32 (Mainz 1885)
- Piano Quintet, in G minor, for 2 violins, viola, cello and piano, Op. 34, 1885 (Warsaw 1931)
