= Edouard Mangeot =

French piano maker

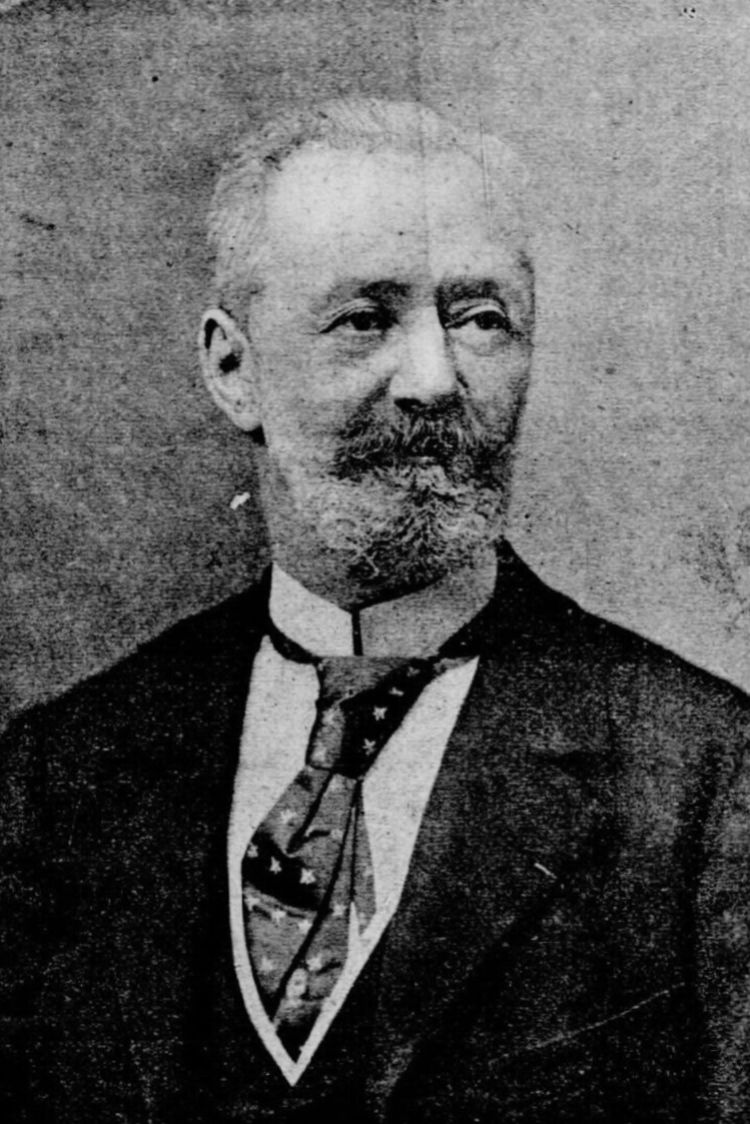
Edouard Mangeot in 1894

Edouard Mangeot (24 April 1835 – 31 May 1898) was a French piano maker. Edouard was born in Nancy, France and died in Paris. Edouard, along with his brother Alfred Mangeot, invented the double piano with mirrored keyboards. The piano consists of two keyboards, an upper and a lower. The lower keyboard replicates that of a standard piano, and the upper is a "mirror" version of it with the highest notes to the left descending to the lowest to the right. The piano was promoted by Polish composer and pianist Juliusz Zarębski.

Edouard Mangeot and his wife Léa-Marie-Jeanne-Christine Lapoulle had six children including the violinist André Mangeot.
