= Sinfonia Concertante (Walton) =

From left: Osbert, Edith and Sacheverell Sitwell, and William Walton, with Neil Porter of the Old Vic 1926

William Walton's Sinfonia Concertante is a three-movement piece for piano and orchestra, first performed in 1928. The composer revised it extensively in 1943. It is an early work, in the anti-romantic style favoured by Walton before the 1930s. There have been several recordings of the piece, featuring both the original and the revised versions.

== Background and first performances ==
In 1925–26, Walton wrote a ballet score that he hoped would be accepted by the impresario Sergei Diaghilev for his company, the Ballets Russes. Diaghilev rejected the score, and Walton reworked it as a concert piece. He dedicated each movement to one of his friends and patrons the Sitwells, the first to Osbert, the second to Edith and the third to "Sachie" (Sacheverell).

The work was first given on 5 January 1928 at a concert of the Royal Philharmonic Society in the Queen's Hall, London. The soloist was York Bowen and the conductor was Ernest Ansermet. The concert was broadcast nationally by the BBC. Walton substantially revised the work in 1943 removing orchestral counterpoint and simplifying the solo piano part. The premiere of the revised version was at the Philharmonic Hall, Liverpool on 9 February 1944, with Cyril Smith as soloist and the Liverpool Philharmonic Orchestra conducted by Malcolm Sargent.

== Structure ==
The instrumentation of the original version comprises piano solo, with two flutes, piccolo, two oboes, cor anglais, clarinet, bass clarinet, two bassoons, contrabassoon, four horns, three trumpets, three trombones, tuba, timpani, two percussionists (tambourine, cymbals, side drum, bass drum, glockenspiel, xylophone) and strings.

The revised version is scored for piano solo, with two flutes, piccolo, two oboes, cor anglais, two clarinets, two bassoons, four horns, two trumpets, three trombones, tuba, timpani, two percussion (tambourine, cymbals, side drum, bass drum, glockenspiel, xylophone) and strings.

There are three movements:

1. Maestoso
2. Andante comodo
3. Allegro vivo sempre scherzando

== Critical reception ==
The first performance was well received, with certain reservations about style and orchestration, but was rather overshadowed by the main work in the concert, the first complete performance in Britain of Ravel's Daphnis et Chloé. When Walton conducted the second performance of the Sinfonia Concertante in April 1928, (Note: With the Bournemouth Municipal Orchestra and Gordon Bryan as soloist.) The Times said:

The work improves on acquaintance and reveals in places an unexpected depth of feeling. We were still conscious of too great a diversity of styles, and Mr Walton has not the same sureness of touch in his orchestration as Ravel or even Lord Berners. [There are] resemblances to Elgar on the one hand, and to Stravinsky and Les Six on the other … Mr Walton has not yet fully found his individuality. Nevertheless, this Sinfonia is a clever and interesting work of real promise.

In a 1984 study of Walton, Neil Tierney describes the Sinfonia Concertante as "a clever and entertaining piece, free from the grimmer features of Walton's mature style … anti-romantic and flavoured by a satirical gaiety".

== Recordings ==
Soloist	Orchestra	Conductor	Version	Year	Timing
Phyllis Sellick	City of Birmingham Orchestra	William Walton	Revised	1945	17'40"
Peter Katin	London Symphony Orchestra	Sir William Walton	Revised	1970	19'58"
Kathryn Stott	Royal Philharmonic Orchestra	Vernon Handley	Original	1989	18'35"
Eric Parkin	London Philharmonic Orchestra	Jan Latham-Koenig	Original	1992	17'52"
Peter Donohoe	English Northern Philharmonia	Paul Daniel	Original	1996	17'30"

Source: William Walton Trust.

== Notes, references and sources ==
=== Sources ===
- Tierney, Neil (1984). William Walton: His Life and Music. London: Robert Hale. ISBN 978-0-70-901784-4.
