= Peter Racine Fricker =

English composer

Peter Racine Fricker (5 September 1920 – 1 February 1990) was an English composer, among the first to establish his career entirely after the Second World War. He lived in the US for the last thirty years of his life. Fricker wrote over 160 works in all the main genres excepting opera. He was a descendant of the French playwright Racine.

== Early career ==
Fricker was born in Ealing, London (the family home was at 42 Colebrooke Avenue, West Ealing). He was educated at St. Paul’s School (then in Hammersmith) where he began playing the organ, and where a fellow student was the future horn player Dennis Brain. He entered the Royal College of Music in 1937, studying composition with R. O. Morris, organ with Ernest Bullock and piano with Henry Wilson.

From 1941 until 1946 he served in the Royal Air Force as a radio operator, mostly in India, and in 1943 he married (Audrey) Helen Clench, a Czech pianist who had been with him at the RCM. After the war Fricker undertook a period of study with Mátyás Seiber at Morley College. He became a professor of composition at the RCM, and in 1952 he became director of music at Morley College, where he succeeded Michael Tippett.

== Music ==
His Wind Quintet (1947) attracted widespread attention, and his First String Quartet (1947) and First Symphony (1949) were also well received. Four more symphonies (1951, 1960, 1966, 1976) followed, which are among his most appreciated works. Other works include Paseo for guitar (1969), Sinfonia in Memoriam Benjamin Britten (1977), two violin concertos (1950, 1954), choral and chamber works (including the 1956 Sonata for Cello and Piano, recorded twenty years later for L'Oiseau Lyre by Julian Lloyd Webber and John McCabe) and works for piano and organ.

In 1952 his Concertante for three pianos, strings and percussion was performed by the identical twin piano duo Mary and Geraldine Peppin with additional pianist Kyla Greenbaum. His Horn Sonata, Op 24 was premiered by Dennis Brain and the pianist, Harry Isaacs at the Conway Hall, on 20 March 1955.

Stylistically his music was significantly different from the mainstream English school of the middle 20th century; instead of following in the lyrical, folk-song influenced tradition of Holst, Vaughan Williams and others, he wrote music which was chromatic, contrapuntal, and acerbic—more akin to Schoenberg, Bartók, and Hindemith than to any of his English contemporaries. Unlike Schoenberg, however, he never abandoned tonality altogether, preferring to work in a dissonant idiom which retained a tonal basis—a position considered to be conservative in the musical milieu of the 1950s and 1960s.

== Later career ==
Fricker became visiting professor of music at the University of California, Santa Barbara in 1964 and moved with his wife to Goleta, Santa Barbara the following year. Six years later, he took a permanent position at this university; he became chairman of the Music Department in 1970, and was appointed "faculty research lecturer" in 1979, the highest academic honour which the university bestows on its faculty. However, he maintained links with the UK and Europe through the International Society for Contemporary Music and the Composers' Guild of Great Britain. From 1984 to 1986 he was president of the Cheltenham International Festival of Music and Literature in England. He continued to compose large-scale works, including his Fourth and Fifth symphonies, the oratorio Whispers at these Curtains op 88 (1984) setting John Donne, and the Concerto for Orchestra, composed for the 1986 festival. His final orchestral work, With Joyance (1989), was written for the Santa Barbara Symphony Orchestra, for which he had become composer in residence. But Fricker died the following year, of cancer of the throat, in Santa Barbara, California, United States, aged 69.

== Works ==
Orchestral

- Symphony No. 1 (1949)
- Prelude, Elegy, and Finale, for strings (1949)
- Symphony No. 2 (1951)
- Dance Scene (1954)
- Litany, for double string orchestra (1955)
- Symphony No. 3 (1960)
- Symphony No. 4 (1966)
- Three Scenes (1966)
- Seven Counterpoints (1967)
- Symphony No. 5 (1976)
- Sinfonia in memoriam Benjamin Britten, for 17 wind instruments (1977)
- Walk by Quiet Waters (1989)

Concertos

- Violin Concerto No. 1 (1950)
- Concertante No. 1, for cor anglais and strings (1950)
- Concertante No. 2, for three pianos, strings and timpani (1951)
- Concerto for viola and orchestra (1953)
- Piano Concerto No. 1 (1954)
- Violin Concerto No. 2, Rapsodia Concertante (1954)
- Laudi Concertati for organ and orchestra (1979)
- Rondeaux for horn and orchestra (1982)
- Concerto for Orchestra (1986)
- Piano Concerto No. 2 (1989)

Voice and instruments

- Night Landscape, for soprano and string trio (1947)
- Three Sonnets by Cecco Angiolieri, for tenor and seven instruments (1947)
- Tomb of St Eulalia: elegy, for counter-tenor, viola da gamba and harpsichord (1955)
- Cantata, for tenor and chamber orchestra (1962)
- O Longs désirs, five songs for soprano and orchestra (1963)
- The Day and the Spirits, for soprano and harpsichord (1966–7)
- Some Superior Nonsense, for tenor and chamber ensemble (1968)
- The Roofs, for coloratura soprano and percussion (1970)
- Come, sleep, for contralto, alto flute and bass clarinet (1972)
- Two Songs, for baritone and piano (1977)

Choral

- Madrigals, a cappella (1947)
- Musick's Empire, for chorus and small orchestra (1955)
- The Vision of Judgement, oratorio for soloists, chorus and orchestra (1957–8)
- Ave Maris Stella (1967)
- Magnificat (1968)
- Whispers at these Curtains, for baritone, chorus, boys choir and orchestra (1984)

Chamber

- Wind Quintet (1947)
- String Quartet No. 1 (1948)
- String Quartet No. 2 (1953)
- Horn Sonata (1955)
- Cello Sonata (1956)
- Octet (1958)
- Serenade No. 1, for six instruments (1959)
- Serenade No.2 for flute, oboe and piano (1959)
- Four Dialogues, for oboe and piano (1965)
- Fantasy for viola and piano (1966)
- Refrains for oboe (1968)
- Paseo, for guitar (1969)
- Serenade No. 3, for saxophone quartet (1969)
- Three Arguments, for bassoon and cello (1969)
- The Groves of Dodona, for six flutes (1973)
- Spirit Puck, for clarinet and percussion (1974)
- String Quartet No. 3 (1976)
- Violin Sonata No. 1 (1950)
- Aspects of Evening, for cello and piano (1985)
- Violin Sonata No. 2 (1987)

Keyboard

- Organ Sonata (1947)
- Choral for organ (1956)
- Suite, for harpsichord (1957)
- Fourteen Aubades, for piano (1958)
- Variations, for piano. (1958)
- Pastorale for organ (1959)
- Toccata, for piano (1959)
- Twelve Studies, for piano (1961)
- Ricercare, for organ (1965)
- Episodes I, for piano (1968)
- Six Pieces, for organ (1968)
- Toccata for organ (1968)
- Episodes II, for piano (1969)
- Praeludium, for organ (1970)
- Intrada for organ (1971)
- Trio Sonata, for organ (1974)
- Sonata for two pianos (1977)
- Invention and Little Toccata, for organ (1976)
- Anniversary, for piano (1978)

[Partial List, Complete Catalog can be found online at the University of California, Santa Barbara Library]

== Discography ==
- A Babe is Born (choral piece) on Hodie: An English Christmas Collection. The Sixteen / Harry Christophers, Coro Records (2001)
- Cello Sonata (Julian Lloyd Webber and John McCabe, Lyrita (2009) (reissue from a 1977 l'Oiseau Lyre LP)
- Horn Sonata, op. 24. Stephen Stirling (horn) and Tony Halstead (piano). From Dennis Brain's Library, MPR 112 (2024)
- O Mistress Mine, for voice with guitar accompaniment, Sir Peter Pears, Julian Bream, RCA Victor (1996)
- The String Quartets (Nos. 1, 2 and 3, and the Adagio and Scherzo), Villiers Quartet, Naxos 8 571374 (2017)
- Symphony No. 2 (with Robert Simpson Symphony No. 1 / Robin Orr Symphony in One Movement). Royal Liverpool Philharmonic Orchestra / Sir John Pritchard, EMI Classics (2002) (reissue from 2 LPs, the first coupling the Fricker and Simpson)
- Violin Concerto, Op.11, F28 (1949–50) (Yfrah Neaman, violin; Norman Del Mar conducting the Royal Philharmonic Orchestra) (2008 Lyrita reissue from a 1974 Argo LP)
- Violin Sonatas No. 1 (1950) and No. 2 (1987) (with Alan Rawsthorne/Vaughan Williams violin sonatas). Susanne Stanzeleit (violin) / Julian Jacobson (piano) Cala Records (2000)
- The Vision of Judgement (Manning/Tear/Groves/Royal Liverpool Philharmonic Orchestra/Leeds Festival Chorus) and Symphony No. 5 (Weir/Davis/BBC Symphony Orchestra) – Lyrita (2016)

(Recordings no longer available)

- String Quartet No.2, Op.20, F46 (1952–53) (Amadeus Quartet, Argo LP, ca.1963, coupled with Benjamin Britten's 2nd String Quartet) (OCLC 26881426)
- Symphony No.5 with organ, Op.74, F153 (1976) (probably Gillian Weir/Sir Colin Davis/BBC Symphony, which was the 5 May 1976 premiere; on an Aries LP, with the performer listing typically replaced, though the conductor given as "Ernest Weir") OCLC 7804255
- Wind Quintet, Op.5, F11 (1947) (recorded on Argo, 1962, by the Brain Quintet)
