= Leo Rowlands =

Leo Rowlands, O.F.M. Cap. (1891–1967) was a Welsh Catholic priest and musical composer, associated with Rhode Island.

== Early life ==
Rowlands was born to Welsh parents (his father was a Congregationalist missionary) in Madagascar on 17 September 1891 and spent the first seven years of his life there before returning to be educated in schools in London and Wales. In 1912 he graduated in music from the University of Wales, Cardiff, going on to the Royal Academy of Music where he studied the piano, composition and singing with Frederick Corder and York Bowen and took his doctorate in music in 1914. In the same year he was received into the Roman Catholic Church and joined the army, serving as a cyclist and gunner in Italy and Flanders. He was captured in Neuve Chapelle in March 1918 and remained a prisoner until the end of the war.

== Musical career ==
After a period as a music teacher at the Seaford School in Seaford on the south coast of England, Rowlands joined the Order of Friars Minor Capuchin in 1920 and was ordained a priest in 1926. He spent the 1930s-1940s at the Friary of St Francis, Providence, Rhode Island, as part of a mission of the British Capuchin Province to the United States. There he established the Gregorian School of Music and the Catholic Choral Society of Providence in 1935 as well as a reputation as a lecturer and recitalist.

Rowlands returned to Great Britain in 1952 where he was introduced to the poet Olive Fraser, some of whose verse he is said to have set to music for voice and piano. He died at the Franciscan House in Crawley, West Sussex, in 1967.

== Compositions ==
- Canticle to the Sun (cantata)
- Symphony of Narragansett Bay (orchestra)
- Elevation (sacred song, setting of a poem by C Martindale) Burns, Oates & Washbourne, London (1933)
- Bon Soir (song) 1958
- Dansa Brasileira (piano) Axelrod, Providence, Rhode Island (1945)
- O Jesu Christe (J van Berchem) arranged by Leo Rowlands, McLaughlin & Reilly Co, Boston (1940)
- Missa Kyrie Fons Bonitatis (STB and organ) McLaughlin & Reilly Co, Boston (1948)
- In convertendo Dominus (When God the Lord) Psalm 125 (SATB and organ) McLaughlin & Reilly Co, Boston (1951)
- St Francis of Assisi (hymn)
- Francis of Assisi (1963) ballet music for piano and four celestial voices, scenario and music by Fr Leo Rowlands, choreography by Joan Denise Moriarty, costumes and decor by Patrick Murray, performed by Irish Theatre Ballet, premiere 7 Nov 1962 in Skibbereen, Co. Cork, thereafter on tour with the company until June 1963
- Entrata (organ solo) L'Organista D'Oggi (date unknown)
- Canzonica (organ solo) L'Organista D'Oggi ((May–June 1962)
- Finale (organ solo, L'Organista D'Oggi (May–June 1965)
- Various hymns for the Notre Dame Hymnal

== Books ==
- The Holy Sacrifice (1941)
- Guide Book for Catholic Church Choirmasters (1938)
