= Willy Burmester =

German violinist

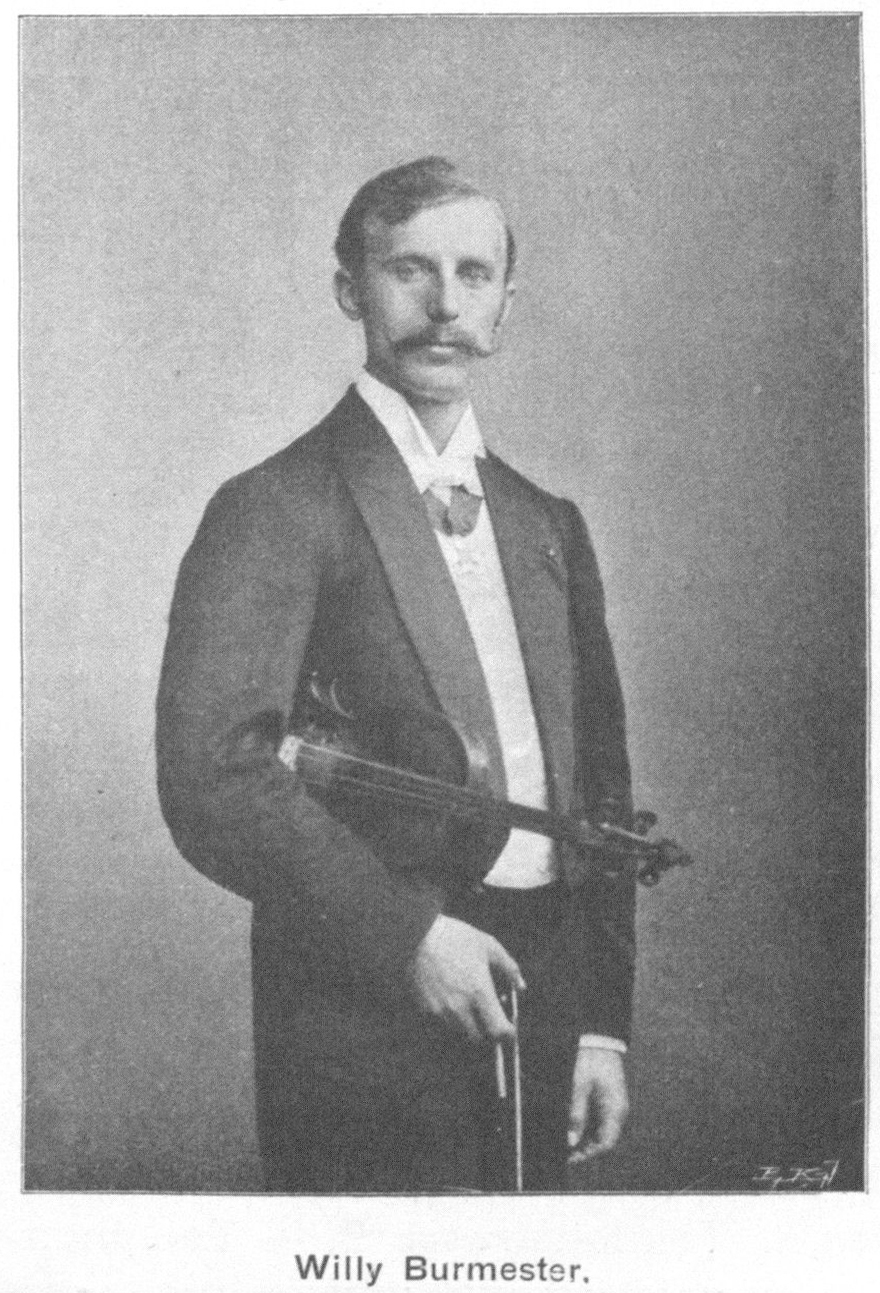
Willy Burmester, c. 1900

Carl Adolph Wilhelm “Willy” Burmester (16 March 1869 – 16 January 1933) was a German violinist.

== Life and career ==
Willy Burmester was born in Hamburg and was a pupil of Joseph Joachim, with whom he studied for many years in Berlin. In 1885, however, he seceded from the Joachim school, and commenced to develop his technique with a view to achieving virtuosity rather than a classic purity of style.

Burmester's rendering of the classics was said to be somewhat cold and devoid of feeling. Nonetheless, he was a well-developed artist: his taste was broad enough to include all schools of composition in his repertoire. His was at his best as an interpreter of the works of Paganini. On the continent his reputation was very high. He failed, however, to make a great impression on his first visit to England and America, though his audiences were compelled to admire his marvelous technical feats, especially his left hand pizzicato, and rapid runs in thirds and tenths. His less than impeccable intonation, however, somewhat limited his success; he also suffered from having worn the end of his first finger down to the nerve.

In his later years, Burmester had remedied these defects, and those who heard him play at his later concerts were much impressed with his sterling musical qualities.

Jean Sibelius originally dedicated his Violin Concerto to Burmester, who promised to play the concerto in Berlin. For financial reasons, Sibelius decided to premiere it in Helsinki in 1904, and since Burmester was unavailable to travel to Finland, Sibelius engaged Viktor Nováček, a violin teacher at the Helsinki Conservatory. The premiere performance was a disaster. Sibelius revised the work and the new version premiered in 1905. Willy Burmester was again asked to be the soloist, but he was again unavailable, so the performance went ahead without him, the Berlin Philharmonic Orchestra's leader Karel Halíř stepping into the soloist's shoes. Burmester was so offended that he refused ever to play the concerto, and Sibelius re-dedicated it to the Hungarian "wunderkind" Ferenc von Vecsey.
