= Arthur Leavins =

British violinist (1917–1995)

Arthur Leavins (born 14 July 1917, Leicester, England – d. 7 January 1995) was a British violinist. He was concertmaster of the Royal Philharmonic Orchestra for most of the 1950s under conductor Sir Thomas Beecham; afterward he played with the BBC Symphony Orchestra and served as concertmaster of the BBC Concert Orchestra for 17 years. A child prodigy, he began performing at the age of four in New Zealand and by the age of 14 was a violinist with the Leicester Symphony Orchestra. He studied with Arthur Catterall at the Royal Academy of Music, and became a member of Catterall's string quartet after earning his diploma. He was married to pianist Mary Baddeley whom he met while playing with the City of Birmingham Symphony Orchestra during the 1940s. They had two sons. As a soloist, he was particularly admired for his performances of Edward Elgar's Violin Concerto.
