= Łucja Rucińska =

Polish composer and pianist

Łucja Miller Rucińska (1817, 1818, or 1820 - 6 August 1882) was a Polish composer and pianist who lived in Ukraine for many years. She published and performed under the name Łucja Rucińska.

Rucińska’s father was the Polish lawyer Ignacy Miller. She married the poet and dissident Justynian Ruciński on 4 May 1838. That September, Justynian was arrested in Kiev. He was deported to Siberia in February 1839, and ultimately spent 25 years in exile from Poland. In 1842 he and Rucinska moved to Turin, Italy, where she gave music and dance lessons to help support the family.

Rucinska later lived in Zytomierz, Ukraine, for many years, where she accompanied the violinist Andrzej Janowicz and taught piano. Her students included Juliusz Zarebski.

In 1852, Rucinska edited A Musical Album for the Piano which was published in St. Petersburg, Russia. It contained 18 compositions, including her own, as well as works by the composers Dobrzyński (Ignacy Dobrzyński or his sons), Kazimierz Lubomirski (1813-1871), Stanislaw Moniuszko, and Maria Szymanowska, among others. During the 1860s, Rucinska returned to Zytomierz.

Rucinska’s works, all for piano, were published by Gebethner. Her publications included:

- A Musical Album for the Piano
- Mazurka
- Polonaise, opus 4
- Souvenir a Mes Amis
