= Element Quartet =

The Element Quartet was a string quartet prominent in British musical life in the 1950s and 1960s. The members were Ernest Element and Sylvia Cleaver (violins), Dorothy Hemming (viola), and Norman Jones (cello). The quartet was the first to perform Schubert's String Quartet No. 2 in C major following the restoration of its previously lost score. The performance was broadcast on BBC Radio on 23 December, one of the many broadcasts they made for the BBC from the 1950s to the early 1960s.

The Element Quartet was particularly associated with the early string quartets of Robert Simpson. The quartet gave the premières of his first three string quartets; Quartet No. 2 is dedicated to the Element Quartet, and Quartet No. 3 is dedicated to their violist, Dorothy Hemming.

== Recordings ==
- Robert Simpson: String Quartets Nos 1, 2 and 3 (from tapes and acetates in the collection of Robert Simpson, recorded ca. 1953/4). Label: Pearl 0023 (1998).
