= Leonard Hirsch =

British musical artist and academic (1902–1995)

- Born: Leonard Hirsch; 19 December 1902; Dublin, Ireland
- Died: 4 January 1995 (aged 92) Bristol, UK
- Genre: Classical
- Occupations: Musician, professor
- Instrument: Violin

Leonard Hirsch FRMCM, FRCM, (19 December 1902 – 4 January 1995) was a British violinist, conductor and professor.

== Biography ==
Hirsch was born in Dublin. His father, Maurice Hirschowitz, a draper, was from Friedrichstadt, Courland in the Pale of Settlement, Russia. The family changed their name to Hirsch in 1902 when Leonard's father became a British subject. Hirsch attended The High School in Dublin and received early instrumental tuition from a local teacher. He moved to England at the age of 17 to study violin at the Royal Manchester College of Music (now the Royal Northern College of Music) under Adolph Brodsky, with whom he studied for eight years.

Not long after arriving in England, he joined the Hallé Orchestra (1921) under Hamilton Harty and later became both leader of the second violins and soloist with the orchestra. Harty, who played piano, often joined the members of the Hirsch String Quartet which Hirsch founded in 1925. The players of the quartet were Hirsch (1st violin), Thomas Mathews (violin), Maurice Ward (viola) and Haydn Rogerson (cello). Hirsch was later to contribute to a book on Harty published in 1978. From 1923 to 1924 Hirsch was both sub-principal and leader of the 2ZY orchestra, the forerunner of the BBC Philharmonic. Hirsch played with the Catterall Quartet from 1925 to 1926.

Hirsch moved from Manchester to London in 1936, where he became leader and occasional conductor of the BBC Empire Orchestra from 1937 until its disbandment in 1939 at the outbreak of the second world war. During the war the Hirsch Quartet continued to perform, giving recitals on the radio, and Hirsch led the Sidney Beer Symphony Orchestra. In 1942 Hirsch played with the newly formed Harry Isaacs Trio, consisting of Isaacs on piano, Hirsch on violin and Norina Semino on cello. The Trio commissioned York Bowen to compose his Trio in E minor op. 118. The first performance of the work was given by the trio at the Wigmore Hall on 4 April 1946. Hirsch played with the R.A.F. Orchestra from 1941 until 1945, touring the US in 1945, and he was a member from 1940 to 1944 of the Council for the Encouragement of Music and the Arts C.E.M.A.

After the war Hirsch led the Philharmonia orchestra, founded and conducted by Walter Legge. Hirsch performed with the Philharmonia from 1945 until 1949. In 1948 he led the Philharmonia, conducted by Muir Mathieson, in a recording of Arnold Bax's 1948 soundtrack score for the film Oliver Twist.

In 1948, Hirsch received his Honorary Fellowship from the Royal Manchester College of Music, FRMCM

Hirsch led the original New London Orchestra from 1949 to 1955 and the Sinfonia of London from 1956. Hirsch also led his own chamber group, the Hirsch Chamber Players from 1961 until 1969.

He coached the string section of the National Youth Orchestra from 1948 to 1966, working with Ruth Railton, who had founded it in 1947. He then conducted the newly formed BBC New Orchestra in 1966, which was later renamed the BBC Training Orchestra in 1968 when Hirsch resigned. It became the Academy of the BBC in 1974 and was wound up in 1977.

From 1966 to 1969 Hirsch was the Chief Music Consultant for the county of Hertfordshire, and from 1962 until 1979 he was a professor at the Royal College of Music in London. Hirsch was made a fellow of the RCM in 1971 (FRCM).

Eric Fogg's Third String Quartet, which remains unpublished, was written in 1929 specially for Hirsch. It is dedicated to the Leonard Hirsch Quartet.

Hirsch made a number of recordings, mainly with his quartet in the early 1950s, including, the Bartok String Quartet No. 1, the Bloch String Quartet No. 2 and Hugo Wolf's Italian Serenade.

Leonard Hirsch died in Bristol on 4 January 1995, not long after his 92nd birthday.
