= Harry Blech =

British violinist and conductor

Harry Blech CBE
- Blech in 1958
- Born: Hirsch Blech; 2 March 1910; London, England
- Died: 9 May 1999 (aged 90); Wimbledon, London, England
- Education: Trinity College of Music; Royal Manchester College of Music
- Occupations: Violinist; Conductor
- Known for: Founder of the London Mozart Players

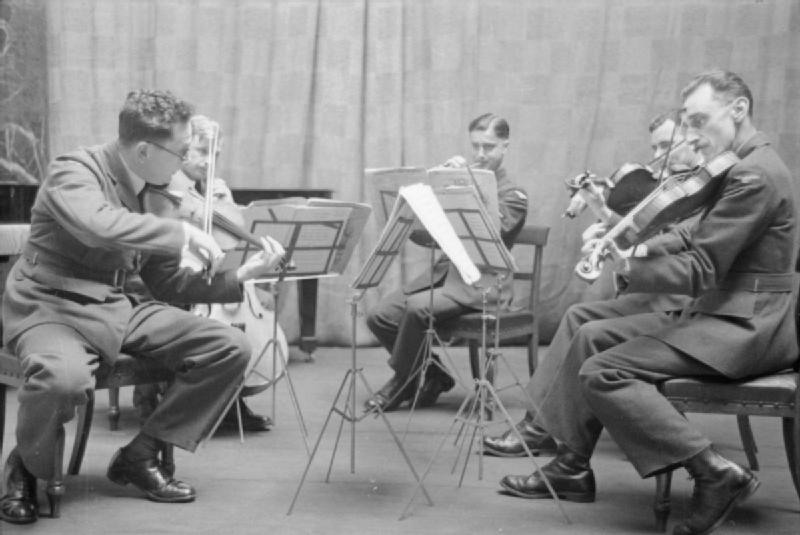
The Blech String Quartet playing Mozart's Horn quintet, K. 407, with soloist Dennis Brain, National Gallery lunchtime concert, 1943

Hirsch "Harry" Blech CBE (2 March 1909 – 9 May 1999) was a British violinist and conductor. He founded the London Mozart Players in 1949, and was known also as a conductor of studio recordings for His Master's Voice and Decca Records.

== Life ==
Harry Blech was born in London, to Henri Blech and his wife, Sophie Stock, in June 1909. His birth was not registered until the following year, and to avoid a fine for late registration his father pretended Harry was born on 2 March 1910, which date has entered many reference works.

He was a scholarship boy at the Trinity College of Music, London, where he studied violin under Sarah Fennings. On her advice he took lessons in Czechoslovakia from Otakar Ševčík. At age 18 he moved to become a pupil of Arthur Catterall at the Royal Manchester College of Music, and in 1929 joined the Hallé Orchestra.

During the 1930s Blech played in the BBC Symphony Orchestra. In 1936 he left to become the leader of his own eponymous string quartet, with Edward Silverman, Douglas Thompson and William Pleeth. During the war, Silverman died of a heart condition, Thomson was killed while learning to fly and Pleeth joined the army, so new string players were brought in. Blech became a conductor in 1942 under wartime conditions, and formed the London Wind Players from the RAF Symphony Orchestra. After the war he formed the London Symphonic Players; the Blech String Quartet disbanded in 1950, when Blech found difficulty in playing the violin.

After conducting Mozart concertos in 1948 for the pianist Dorothea Braus, Blech formed the London Mozart Players, which he conducted until 1984, when he was succeeded by Jane Glover. He was twice married, having children with both wives, and died in Wimbledon on 9 May 1999.
