= Lionel Tertis =

English violist (1876–1975)

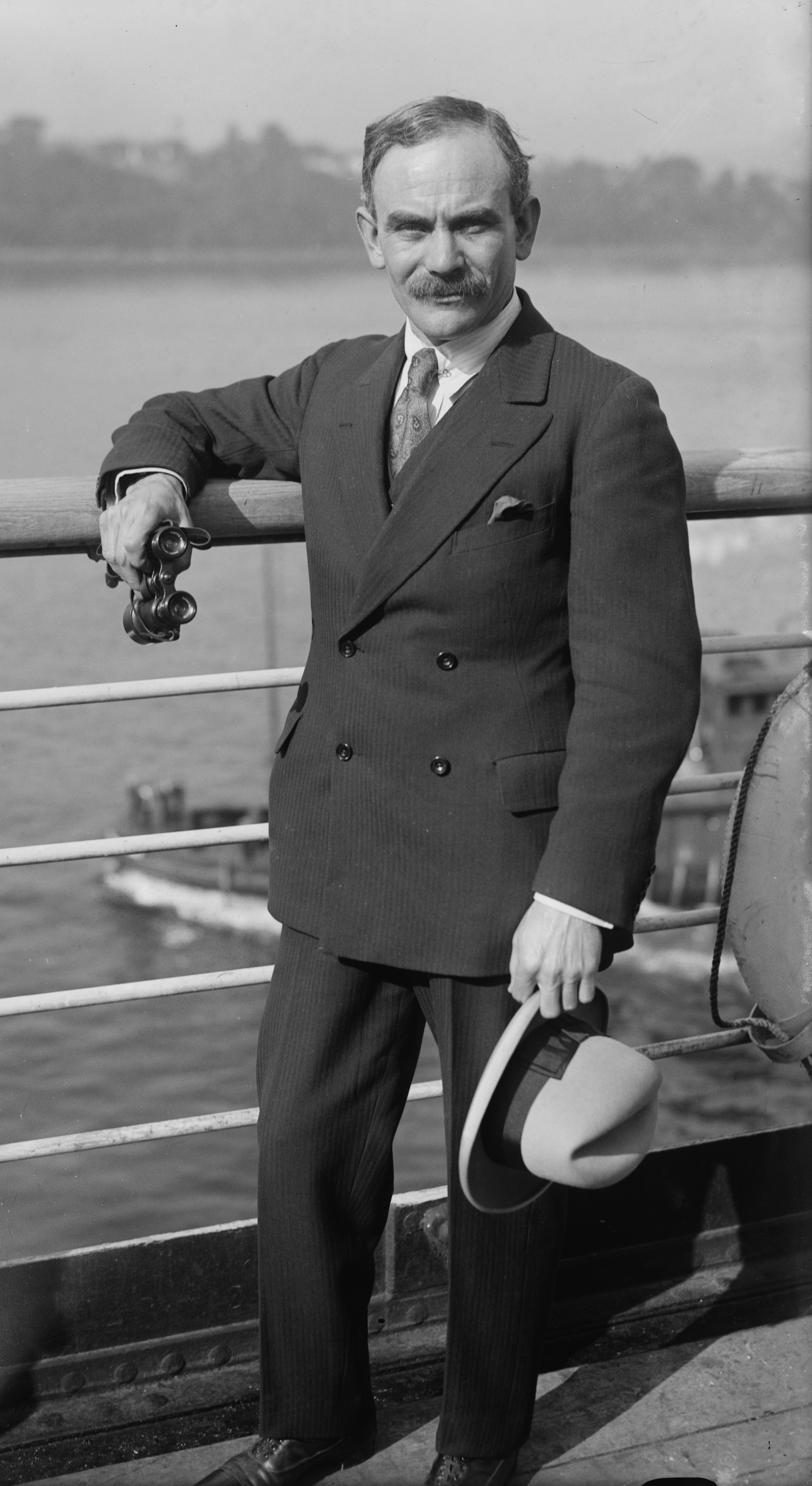

Background information
- Born: 29 December 1876; West Hartlepool, United Kingdom
- Died: 22 February 1975 (aged 98) Wimbledon, London
- Occupation: Violist
- Instrument: Viola
- Years active: 1900-1975

Lionel Tertis, CBE (29 December 1876 – 22 February 1975) was an English violist. A noted teacher, he was one of the first viola players to achieve international fame.

== Career ==
Tertis was born in West Hartlepool, the son of Polish-Jewish immigrants. Tertis's first instrument was the piano, and at thirteen he left home to earn a living as a pianist. In 1892 he had saved enough money to enter Trinity College of Music in London, where he had violin lessons under B.M. Carrodus, whilst continuing to learn the piano under R. W. Lewis for three intermittent terms. In 1895, after six months at Leipzig Conservatorium, Tertis entered the Royal Academy of Music (RAM) in London and studied the violin under Hans Wessely. In 1897, whilst at the RAM, he was encouraged by the principal, Alexander Mackenzie, to take up the viola instead. Under the additional influence of Oskar Nedbal, he did so and rapidly became one of the best-known violists of his time, touring Europe and the US as a soloist.

As Professor of Viola at the RAM (from 1900), he encouraged his colleagues and students to compose for the instrument, thereby greatly expanding its repertoire. In 1906, Tertis was temporarily in the famous Bohemian Quartet to replace the violist/composer Oskar Nedbal and later he took the viola position in the Walenn Quartet.

Composers such as Arnold Bax, Frank Bridge, Gustav Holst, Benjamin Dale, York Bowen, Ralph Vaughan Williams, Arthur Bliss, Arnold Trowell and William Walton wrote pieces for him. The Walton piece was his Viola Concerto; however, Tertis did not give the world premiere as he found it difficult to comprehend at the time; that honour went to Paul Hindemith. His pupil Bernard Shore took on the second performance at the Proms in August 1930. Tertis first performed the work a month later at the International Society for Contemporary Music festival in Liège. Over the next three years he gave five more performances of the concerto.

He owned a 1717 Montagnana from 1920 to 1937 which he found during one of his concert tours to Paris in 1920, and took a chance in acquiring. According to his memoirs, it was "shown to me in an unplayable condition, without bridge, strings or fingerboard.... No case was available – it was such a large instrument 17 1/8 inches – so my wife came to the rescue by wrapping it in her waterproof coat, and that is how it was taken across the English Channel." Tertis preferred a large viola to get an especially rich tone from his instrument. Knowing that some would find a 17-1/8-inch instrument too large he created his own Tertis model, which provides many of the tonal advantages of the larger instrument in a manageable 16-3/4-inch size. Tertis sold the 1717 Montagnana to his pupil Bernard Shore in 1937, who in turn passed it on to his pupil Roger Chase.

Along with William Murdoch (piano), Albert Sammons, and Lauri Kennedy, Tertis formed the Chamber Music Players. He also encouraged and coached Sidney Griller as he worked to found the Griller Quartet in 1928, and influenced the Griller's enthusiasm for the first Viennese School.

In November 1934, Tertis performed Strauss's Don Quixote with Pablo Casals (who incidentally shared the same birth date as Tertis) at the Queen's Hall, with the BBC Symphony Orchestra, conducted by Sir Henry Wood.

In 1937, while at the height of his powers, he announced his retirement from the concert platform to concentrate on teaching. He appeared as soloist only one more time, at a special concert in 1949 to an invited audience at the RAM to help raise money for his fund to encourage the composition of music for the viola.

He was appointed a Commander of the Order of the British Empire (CBE) in the 1950 New Year's Honours.

Tertis composed several original works and also arranged many pieces not originally for the viola, such as Edward Elgar's Cello Concerto. He was the author of a number of publications about string playing, the viola in particular, and his own life. They include Cinderella No More and My Viola and I.

Lionel Tertis died on 22 February 1975 in Wimbledon, London. He was 98 years old.

== Legacy ==
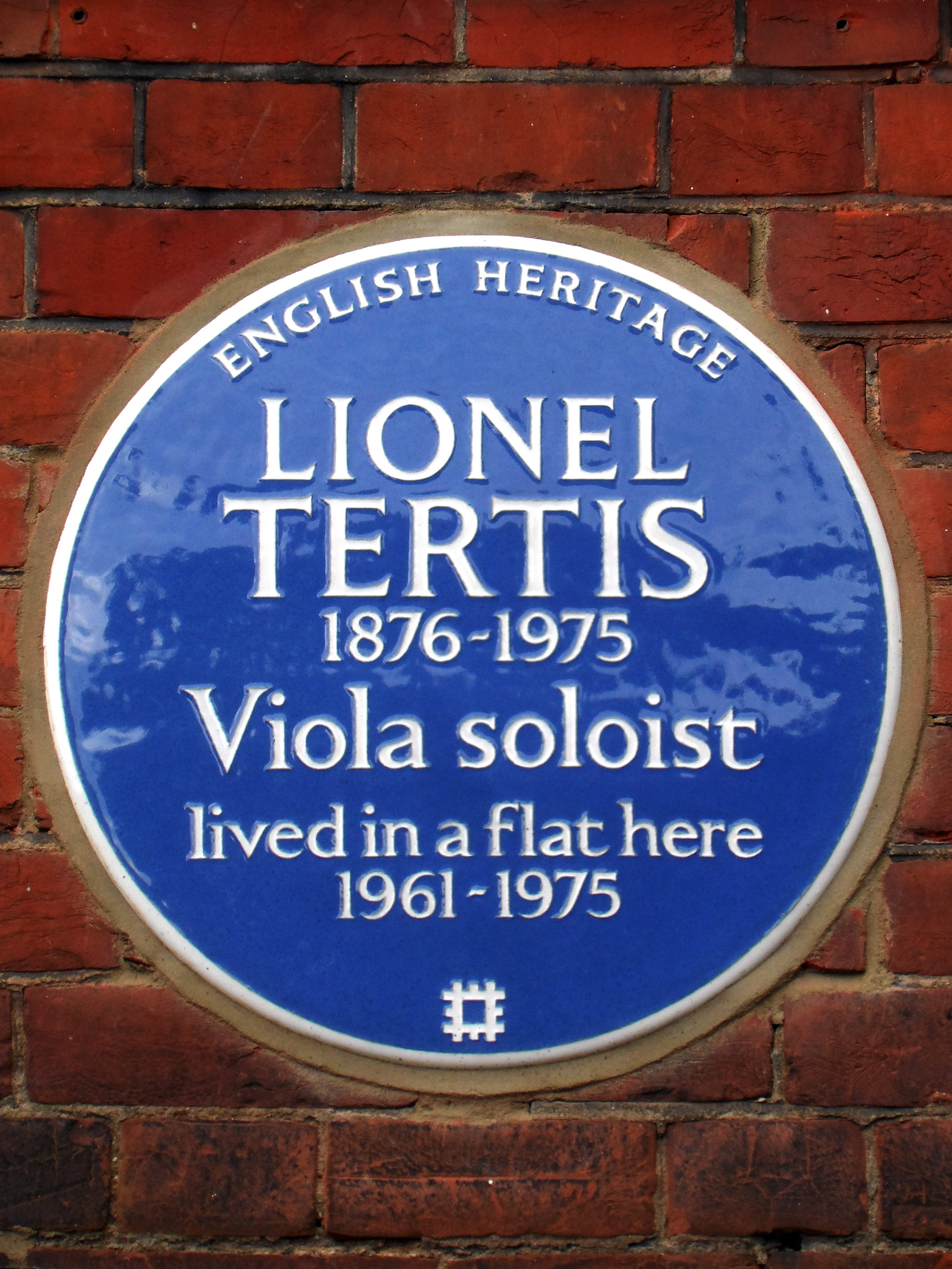
English Heritage blue plaque erected 18 May 2015

The Lionel Tertis International Viola Competition was established in 1980 to honour his memory.

In February 2007 Roger Chase, along with his accompanist, pianist Michiko Otaki, initiated "The Tertis Project," a series of concerts devoted to works composed for Tertis. A CD, The Tertis Tradition, was issued in 2009.

In 2015, English Heritage unveiled a blue plaque at his Wimbledon, London home.

Many fine English violists were students of Tertis, including Harry Berly, Rebecca Clarke, Eric Coates, Winifred Copperwheat, Paul Cropper, Harry Danks, C. Sydney Errington, Watson Forbes, Max Gilbert, Hope Hambourg, Raymond Jeremy, James Lockyer, Frederick Riddle, Ian Ritchie, Philip Sainton, Beryl Scawen Blunt, Bernard Shore, Gilbert Shufflebotham, Jacqueline Townshend, Maurice Ward and Lena Wood. Tertis also taught the Australian-born violist, Keith Cummings.

== Works ==
=== Original compositions ===
- Elizabethan Melody for viola and cello
- 15th Century Folk Song: 1452-Anonymous for viola, cello and piano
- Hier au soir for viola and piano
- Rêverie for viola and piano
- Sunset (Coucher du soleil) for viola (or violin or cello) and piano
- Three Sketches for viola and piano

1. Serenade; revised as A Tune
2. The Blackbirds (1952)
3. The River

- A Tune for viola and piano (published 1954); 2nd version of Serenade
- Variations on a Passacaglia of Handel for 2 violas (1935); original work based on the Passacaglia by Johan Halvorsen
- Variations on a Four Bar Theme of Handel for viola and cello

=== Transcriptions, arrangements and adaptations ===
For viola and piano unless otherwise noted

| Original composer | Title | Remarks |
|---|---|---|
| Anton Arensky (1861–1906) | Berceuse | |
| Johann Sebastian Bach (1685–1750) | Air on the C-String | original from Orchestral Suite No. 3 |
| Johann Sebastian Bach (1685–1750) | Aria "Come Sweet Death" | from Cantata 191 |
| Johann Sebastian Bach (1685–1750) | Adagio from Toccata in C major | published 1935; original for organ |
| Ludwig van Beethoven (1770–1827) | Menuet | published 1912; original for orchestra; from 12 Menuette, WoO 7 |
| Ludwig van Beethoven (1770–1827) | Theme and Variations (on Mozart's "Ein Mädchen oder Weibchen"), Op. 66 (1796) | original for cello and piano |
| Johannes Brahms (1833–1897) | Minnelied, Op. 71 No. 5 (1877) | original for voice and piano |
| Johannes Brahms (1833–1897) | Wir wandelten for violin or viola and piano, Op. 96 No. 2 (1884) | original for voice and piano |
| Willy Burmester (1869–1933) | Französisches Lied aus dem 18. Jahrhundert (French Air from the 18th Century) (1909) | original for violin and piano |
| Eric Coates (1886–1957) | Ballad in G major, Op. 13 (1906) | |
| Eric Coates (1886–1957) | First Meeting: Souvenir | |
| Frederick Delius (1862–1934) | Caprice and Elegy for viola and orchestra (1930) | original for cello and orchestra |
| Frederick Delius (1862–1934) | Double Concerto for violin, viola and orchestra (1915–1916) | original for violin, cello and orchestra |
| Frederick Delius (1862–1934) | Serenade from the drama Hassan (1920–1923) | |
| Frederick Delius (1862–1934) | Sonata No. 2 (1922–1923) | original for violin and piano; 1929 transcription |
| Frederick Delius (1862–1934) | Sonata No. 3 (1930) | original for violin and piano; 1932 transcription |
| Ernő Dohnányi (1877–1960) | Sonata in C♯ minor, Op. 21 (1912) | original for violin and piano |
| Edward Elgar (1857–1934) | Concerto in E minor for viola and orchestra, Op. 85 (1918–1919) | original for cello and orchestra |
| Gabriel Fauré (1845–1924) | Après un rêve, Op. 7 No. 1 | original for voice and piano |
| Gabriel Fauré (1845–1924) | Élégie for viola and orchestra, Op. 24 | original for cello and orchestra |
| Baldassare Galuppi | Aria Amorosa | |
| Giovan Battista Grazioli (1746–1828) | Sonata in F major | original for cello and continuo |
| Edvard Grieg (1843–1907) | Ich liebe Dich (I Love But Thee!), Op. 5 No. 3 (1864–1865) | original from Hjertets Melodier, 4 songs for voice and piano |
| George Frideric Handel (1685–1759) | Arietta | published 1910; transcription (violin and piano) by Hamilton Harty of "Si che lieta goderò" from Rodrigo; viola part by Tertis |
| George Frideric Handel (1685–1759) | Sarabande | transcription of "Sorge nel petto" from Rinaldo |
| George Frideric Handel (1685–1759) | Sonata in F major (Adagio and Allegro) | original for violin with basso continuo |
| Joseph Haydn (1732–1809) | Capriccio | published 1912; transcription (violin and piano) by Willy Burmester from String Quartet No. 49, Op. 64 No. 2; viola part by Tertis |
| Joseph Haydn (1732–1809) | Menuet | published 1912; original for orchestra; transcription (violin and piano) by Willy Burmester from Symphony No. 96; viola part by Tertis |
| William Yeates Hurlstone (1876–1906) | 4 Characteristic Pieces (1899) | original for clarinet and piano |
| John Ireland (1879–1962) | The Holy Boy | published 1918 |
| John Ireland (1879–1962) | Sonata in G minor (1923) | original for cello and piano; 1941 transcription |
| John Ireland (1879–1962) | Sonata No. 2 in A minor (1915–1917) | original for violin and piano; 1918 transcription |
| Fritz Kreisler (1875–1962) | La Chasse, Caprice in the Style of Cartier | original for violin and piano |
| Franz Liszt (1811–1886) | Liebestraum No. 3 in A♭ major, S. 541 (ca. 1850) | published 1954; original for piano |
| Étienne Méhul (1763–1817) | Gavotte | published 1912 |
| Felix Mendelssohn (1809–1847) | Duetto | original for piano: Song without Words, Op. 38 No. 6 (1836) |
| Felix Mendelssohn (1809–1847) | Fleecy Cloud | original for piano: Song without Words, Op. 53 No. 2 (1838) |
| Felix Mendelssohn (1809–1847) | Gondola Song | original for piano: Song without Words, Op. 19 No. 6 (1830) |
| Felix Mendelssohn (1809–1847) | On Wings of Song, Op. 34 No. 2 (1835) | original for voice and piano: Auf Flügeln des Gesanges |
| Felix Mendelssohn (1809–1847) | Spring Song | original for piano: Song without Words, Op. 62 No. 6 (1842) |
| Felix Mendelssohn (1809–1847) | Sweet Remembrance | original for piano: Song without Words, Op. 19 No. 1 (1831) |
| Wolfgang Amadeus Mozart (1756–1791) | Menuet | |
| Wolfgang Amadeus Mozart (1756–1791) | Sonata [No. 22] in A major, K. 305: Allegro molto; Tema con variazione | original for violin and piano |
| Gabriel Pierné (1863–1937) | Sérénade, Op. 7 | original for piano |
| Nicola Porpora (1686–1768) | Aria in E major | extracted from the collection I Classici Violinisti Italiani, freely developed and harmonized by Mario Corti |
| Anton Rubinstein (1829–1894) | Melody in F, Op. 3 No. 1 (1852) | original for piano |
| Camille Saint-Saëns (1835–1921) | Melody for viola or violin or cello and piano (1959) | |
| Franz Schubert (1797–1828) | Allegretto, Duet for violin or viola or 2 violins or 2 violas and piano (1936) | original from the String Quartet No. 15 in G major, Op. 161, D. 887 (1826) |
| Franz Schubert (1797–1828) | Ave Maria, Op. 52 No. 6 (D. 839) (1825) | original for voice and piano |
| Franz Schubert (1797–1828) | Du bist die Ruh, Op. 59 No. 3 (D. 776) | original for voice and piano |
| Franz Schubert (1797–1828) | Nacht und Träume, Op. 43 No. 2 (D. 827) | original for voice and piano |
| Robert Schumann (1810–1856) | Abendlied (Evening Song) in D♭ major, Op. 85 No. 12 (1849) | original for piano 4-hands |
| Robert Schumann (1810–1856) | Romance, Op. 28 No. 2 | original for piano |
| Robert Schumann (1810–1856) | Schlummerlied (Slumber Song) in E♭ major, Op. 124 No. 16 | original for piano |
| Cyril Scott (1879–1970) | Cherry Ripe | |
| Alexander Scriabin (1872–1915) | Étude, Op. 42 No. 4 | original for piano |
| Joseph Sulzer (1850–1926) | Sarabande: Air on the G-string, Op. 8 | original for cello (or violin) and piano |
| Karol Szymanowski (1882–1937) | Pieśń Roksany (Chant de Roxane) | from the opera Król Roger |
| Pyotr Ilyich Tchaikovsky (1840–1893) | Chanson triste, Op. 40 No. 2 | original for piano |
| Pyotr Ilyich Tchaikovsky (1840–1893) | June (Barcarolle), Op. 37b No. 6 (1875–1876) | original for piano |
| Pyotr Ilyich Tchaikovsky (1840–1893) | None But the Lonely Heart (also entitled A Pleading), Op. 6 No. 6 (1869) | original for voice and piano |
| Francis Thomé (1850–1909) | Sous la feuillée, Op. 29 | original for piano |
| traditional | Londonderry Air "Farewell to Cucullain" for viola or violin and piano | |
| traditional | Old Irish Air for viola or violin and piano | |
| William Wolstenholme (1865–1931) | Allegretto in E♭ major, Op. 17 No. 2 | published 1900; original for organ |
| William Wolstenholme (1865–1931) | Canzona in B♭ major, Op. 12 No. 1 | original for organ |
| William Wolstenholme (1865–1931) | Die Antwort (The Answer), Op. 13 No. 2 | original for organ |
| William Wolstenholme (1865–1931) | Die Frage (The Question), Op. 13 No. 1 | original for organ |
| William Wolstenholme (1865–1931) | Romanza, Op. 17 No. 1 | published 1900; original for organ |

== Recordings ==
Lionel Tertis made recordings in ensembles:

- Vocalion D-02019 Robert Fuchs: Duet; Handel (arr. Halvorsen): Passacaglia with Albert Sammons
- Columbia LX225-7 Brahms: Sonata in F minor, Op.120/1, with Harriet Cohen, piano
- Columbia L 2342-3 Delius (arr. Tertis): (Violin) sonata 2 (1915) 3s / Hassan - Serenade, with G. Reeves, piano

and as a soloist:

- HMV Treasury HLM 7055, Sonatas by Brahms, Handel, Delius, music by Bach, Mendelssohn etc. Recorded between 1920 & 1933. issued:74

== Writings ==
- My Viola and I. London: Kahn & Averill. 1991. ISBN 1-871-08220-X.
- Cinderella No More. London: Peter Nevill LTD. 1953.

== Other reading ==
- John White, Lionel Tertis: The First Great Virtuoso of the Viola (Woodbridge: Boydell Press, 2006)
- Tully Potter, "Chase Fulfilled", The Strad, August 1988.
