= Bartlett and Robertson =

Classical piano duo

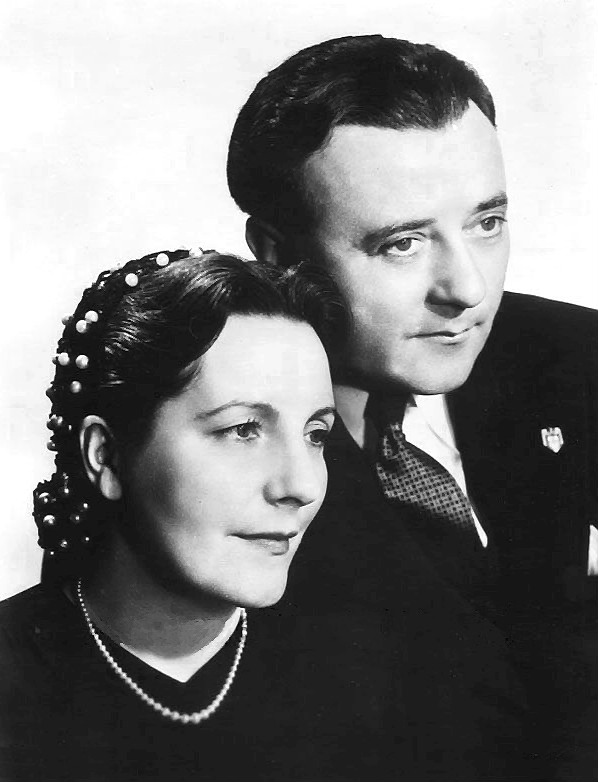
- Bartlett and Robertson in 1938

Background information
- Also known as: Ethel Bartlett and Rae Robertson
- Origin: England
- Genres: Classical
- Years active: 1924–1956
- Labels: National Gramophonic Society; His Master's Voice; Columbia Masterworks Records

Ethel Bartlett (1896–1978) and Rae Robertson (1893–1956), popularly known as Bartlett and Robertson, were a husband-and-wife classical piano duo who were credited with popularising two-piano music in Europe and the United States in the 1930s and 1940s through their extensive touring, recordings, and radio performances. Of English and Scottish background respectively, Bartlett and Robertson met during their studies at the Royal Academy of Music in London and married in 1921. Although they initially pursued solo careers, they teamed up as duo-pianists in the late 1920s and conducted annual international tours for over two decades. Several major composers of their era wrote duo-piano compositions especially for them, including Sir Arnold Bax, Benjamin Britten, Lennox Berkeley, and the Czech composer Bohuslav Martinů.

== Early life and marriage ==
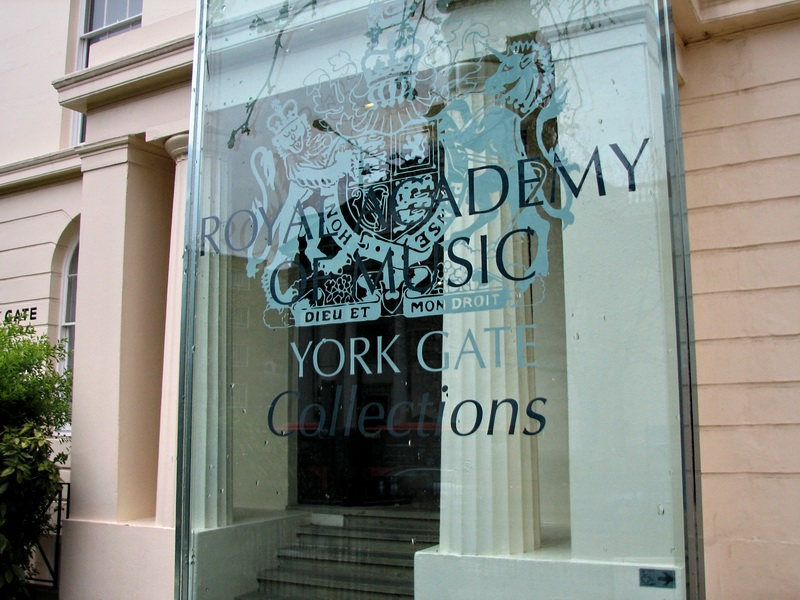
Royal Academy of Music, London

Ethel Agnes Bartlett was born in Epping Forest, England, on 6 June 1896. At age 10 her family moved to London. In 1915 she entered the Royal Academy of Music on an Associated Board Scholarship; her younger sister Edith was enrolled as a vocalist at the Academy. Bartlett studied under Frederick Moore and Tobias Matthay at the Academy, graduating in 1919. She also studied under Artur Schnabel in Berlin. In addition to piano, she played harpsichord and chamber music.

John Rae Robertson was born in the village of Ardersier in the Scottish Highlands on 29 November 1893. He was the eighth of nine children in a minister's family. He showed an aptitude for piano playing at a very young age and began playing the organ at his father's church on Sundays at the age of five. He continued to study piano as a youth and as a student at the University of Edinburgh, where he completed his M.A. in Modern Languages. In September 1914 he began studying under Tobias Matthay at the Royal Academy of Music, but was drafted in January 1915 into the English army for World War I. He sustained an arm wound at the Battle of the Somme in July 1916 and a hand wound at Ypres in 1917. In 1918 he received his army discharge and returned to the Royal Academy.

He met Bartlett upon his return to the Academy, and the two were married in Marylebone, London, in September 1921.

== Musical career ==
Development is much easier if both pianists have been trained in the same school of technique … two pianists who have the same technical approach will have no trouble introducing variety into their playing. But if they have entirely different styles, they will have a struggle to achieve balance and coordination.

— Ethel Bartlett (1946)

Bartlett and Robertson initially pursued solo concert careers. Bartlett had made the acquaintance of John Barbirolli at the Royal Academy of Music during the war years, as Barbirolli had been too young for the draft, and they possibly had an intimate relationship. She became his exclusive accompanist in the 1920s. She also performed with other vocalists and as a soloist. Robertson played both with vocalists and other pianists. The two also taught at Matthay's School of Music on Wimpole Street.

The couple first performed as duo-pianists on 17 June 1924 at Wigmore Hall, to mixed reviews. The Times's critic wrote, "They have not fully understood yet that the point of playing on two pianos is not to get more sound but to work out intricate detail more clearly". After their two-piano recital on 15 August 1924, The Times applauded their performance for its "great zest, as though they really enjoyed every note of the contrapuntal figuration".

They achieved fame in the United States and Europe in the 1930s and 1940s as the "foremost two-piano team". By the mid-1940s, they were appearing in over 100 concerts a year, and had toured the United States, Canada, South America, and South Africa. In addition to their annual international concert tours, they played several seasons with the New York Philharmonic Symphony Orchestra, Rochester Philharmonic Orchestra, Washington National Symphony Orchestra, and Cincinnati Symphony Orchestra. In July 1940 they played before 35,000 listeners at the Hollywood Bowl. They also appeared on radio, playing, for example, Robertson's arrangement of Liebesträume No. 3 by Liszt on The Bell Telephone Hour national broadcast on 6 July 1942.

== Repertoire and recordings ==
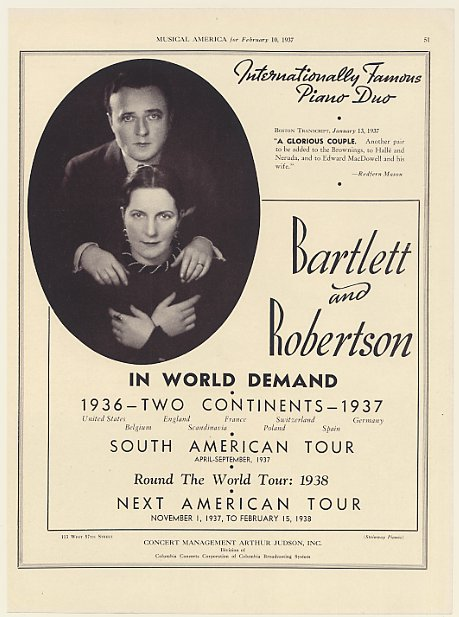
A 1937 concert advert

In a 1935 interview, Bartlett explained that when she and Robertson began their duo-piano partnership, they were the first piano duo in England and consequently had to search extensively for appropriate music. "We have discovered things so old that they were brand-new to audiences", she said. The couple also commissioned pieces from the major composers of their day. They commissioned five compositions from Sir Arnold Bax, the most famous being his Sonata for two pianos (1929) which they premiered in London on 10 December 1929. Benjamin Britten composed three pieces for them: Introduction and Rondo alla Burlesca (1940), Scottish Ballad, Op. 26 (1941), and Mazurka Elegiaca, Op. 23, No. 2 (1941). Lennox Berkeley dedicated his Polka for two pianos, Op. 5, to them; they performed it in a 1934 recital for Mrs. Eleanor Roosevelt. In 1944 they commissioned a two-piano concerto from Béla Bartók, but he did not live to compose it. Czech composer Bohuslav Martinů wrote Three Czech Dances (1949) for them; they premiered the duo-piano work in Edinburgh in September 1949.

Bartlett and Robertson initially signed with the National Gramophonic Society. In 1930, they signed with His Master's Voice, for which they recorded Bach's Concerto in C for two keyboards, BWV1061; Saint-Saëns' Variations on the trio from the minuet; Beethoven's Sonata in E Flat, Op. 31, No. 3; and the waltz from Arensky's Suite, Op. 15. In 1939 they began recording exclusively for Columbia Masterworks Records, producing recordings such as Schumann's Andante and variations, Debussy's En blanc et noir, and Elizabethan Suite (1945), arranged by Bartlett.

== Technique ==
Bartlett and Robertson were often praised for their unity of thought and execution. At their first appearance in Montreal in 1936, a reviewer for the Montreal Gazette expressed it thus: "The playing of Bartlett and Robertson is unique in that one thinks while hearing them, not of two people at two pianos, but of four hands at a double keyboard controlled by a single mind". A reviewer of their 1936 recital at the Orpheum Theatre in New York wrote:

From their first notes they brought to the audience an impression of absolute synchronization and harmony of thought and concept. Their muscular coordination was as though under one kinesthetic control. … it is true also that each artist brought a completely different personality to the music. Our great two-piano concert performers have in the past usually been men. The very feminine qualities of interpretation which Miss Bartlett possesses were fused with Mr. Robertson's conception of the music in a very fresh and charming manner.

== Other activities ==
Regarded as "one of England's most beautiful women", Bartlett was a favourite portrait subject for both Harold Knight and his wife, Dame Laura Knight, who painted her numerous times over a period of 20 years from the time she was a teenager, and showed her portraits in their exhibitions. A good example is on display at the Atkinson Art Gallery and Library. Bartlett also designed her own clothes for the duo's concerts.

== Later life ==
The couple owned a home in Escondido, California, at which Britten was a guest in 1941. They moved to the United States permanently in the 1950s. Robertson died in Los Angeles on 5 November 1956 at the age of 63. Bartlett taught piano in her later years. She died in Los Angeles on 17 April 1978, aged 81.

The Bartlett and Robertson Collection, including press clippings, personal photographs, and letters, is housed at the Royal Academy of Music in London.
