= Laurance Turner =

British violinist (1899–1976)

- Born: Laurance Turner; 7 November 1899; Huddersfield, England
- Died: 21 January 1976 (aged 76) Manchester, England
- Genre: Classical
- Occupations: Musician, professor
- Instrument: Violin

Laurance Turner (7 November 1899 – 21January 1976) was a British violinist from Huddersfield. He was leader of the Hallé Orchestra from 1939 to 1958 and sub-leader with the BBC Symphony Orchestra from 1930 to 1940. He performed with ensembles including the Yorkshire Quartet, the Catterall Quartet, his own eponymously named Turner Quartet, and he conducted the Turner Orchestral Players. He was professor of violin at the Royal Manchester College of Music and Senior Professor of Violin at the Huddersfield College of Technology.

== Early life and education ==
Laurance Turner was born in Huddersfield, Yorkshire, on 7 November 1899 to Abraham Turner, a meat purveyor, and his wife Alice Greenfield. His father played the piano and his mother and maternal grandmother were singers.

Turner studied at Huddersfield College and the University of Leeds with Arthur W. Kaye and Arthur Eaglefield Hull. He also studied with Arthur Catterall and Eugène Ysaÿe.

== Career ==
Turner gave his debut recital in London at the Wigmore Hall on 30 September 1920, and performed again at the venue in 1922, and 1925. Turner performed the Brahms and Beethoven Violin Concertos with the Queen's Hall Orchestra, conducted by Henry Wood, at the Queen's Hall in May 1924.

In 1923, Turner formed his own String Quartet, the Turner String Quartet, which continued to perform for the next 40 years. With the Turner String Quartet, Turner gave the first performance in England of Béla Bartók's 6th String Quartet in April 1942, and gave the first performance in Manchester of all six Bartok String Quartets in May 1949.

Throughout the 1920s and 30s, Turner played with a number of other quartets, including the Yorkshire String Quartet alongside Norman Rouse (2nd violin), Allan Smith (viola) and Collin Smith (cello); the Catterall Quartet, and the Leeds Bohemian String Quartet.

In February 1926, Turner gave a violin recital at Leeds Little Theatre, with the composer John Ireland, when he, amongst other works, performed Ireland's Violin Sonatas in D and A minor.

Turner joined The Hallé Orchestra in 1920, becoming the leader of the orchestra in 1939. With the Hallé, he played under numerous conductors including Hamilton Harty, Thomas Beecham, Henry Wood, Malcolm Sargent, John Barbirolli, (Note: Barbirolli came to conduct the Hallé on the recommendation of Turner, who, in 1942 suggested to Philip Godlee and Robert J. Forbes, that Barbirolli was the conductor they needed) Adrian Boult, Albert Coates, David Willcocks and Leslie Heward.

Turner conducted the Hallé himself on several occasions. In 1941 he conducted the orchestra at a concert in his hometown of Huddersfield.

He joined the BBC Symphony Orchestra in 1930 and was their sub-leader under Sir Adrian Boult until 1940.

In 1939 he was appointed leader of the BBC Northern Orchestra, succeeding Alfred Barker.

During the war, Turner continued to perform, and in 1944 he performed Bredon Hill, Rhapsody for Violin and Orchestra by Julius Harrison with the Hallé at the Manchester Capitol Theatre. Turner performed a number of violin concertos during his time at the Hallé under Barbirolli. Notable performances include: a performance of Delius's Concerto for violin, cello and orchestra at the Royal Albert Hall in 1946 with Haydn Rogerson, a performance of Camille Saint-Saëns' Violin Concerto No.3 in B Minor Op.61 in 1949, and no less than eight performances of the Ernest Moeran Violin Concerto between 1946 and 1959.

Turner performed Mozart's Sinfonia Concertante for Violin and Viola in E flat major, K.364 with George Alexander, principal violist of the Hallé, on a number of occasions between 1945 and 1951.

In 1953 he was selected by Sir Adrian Boult to play in the orchestra for the Coronation of Elizabeth II.

From 1954 to 1972, Turner directed the Manchester Mid-day Concerts. In May 1957 at a concert in Manchester's Lesser Free Trade Hall, with Barbirolli playing the cello, Turner performed Elgar's Quintet for Piano and Strings in A minor, Op.84.

At his retirement from the Hallé in 1958, Turner had played over 3750 concerts with the orchestra.

Turner was Professor of Violin at the Royal Manchester College of Music from 1926 until 1931 and again from 1940 until 1947. He was also the Senior Violin Professor at the Huddersfield College of Technology from 1958.

Turner played on a Joseph Hel violin as well as a 1684 Stradivarius which he owned from 1932.

== Death and legacy ==
Turner died at his home in Manchester on 21 January 1976. After his death, an appeal fund was set up to raise funds for a cup for the Mrs Sunderland Music Festival, and for an annual prize, in his name, to be awarded at the Royal Northern College of Music.

== References and sources ==
=== Sources ===
==== Books ====
- Townend, P. (1962). Who's Who in Music. London: Burke's Peerage Ltd.
- Kennedy, Michael (1982). The Hallé 1858 – 1983, A History of the Orchestra. Manchester University Press. ISBN 978-0719009327.
