= Arthur Catterall =

English violinist, orchestral leader and conductor (1883 - 1943)

Arthur Catterall (25 May 1883 – 28 November 1943) was an English concert violinist, orchestral leader and conductor, one of the best-known English classical violinists of the first half of the twentieth century.

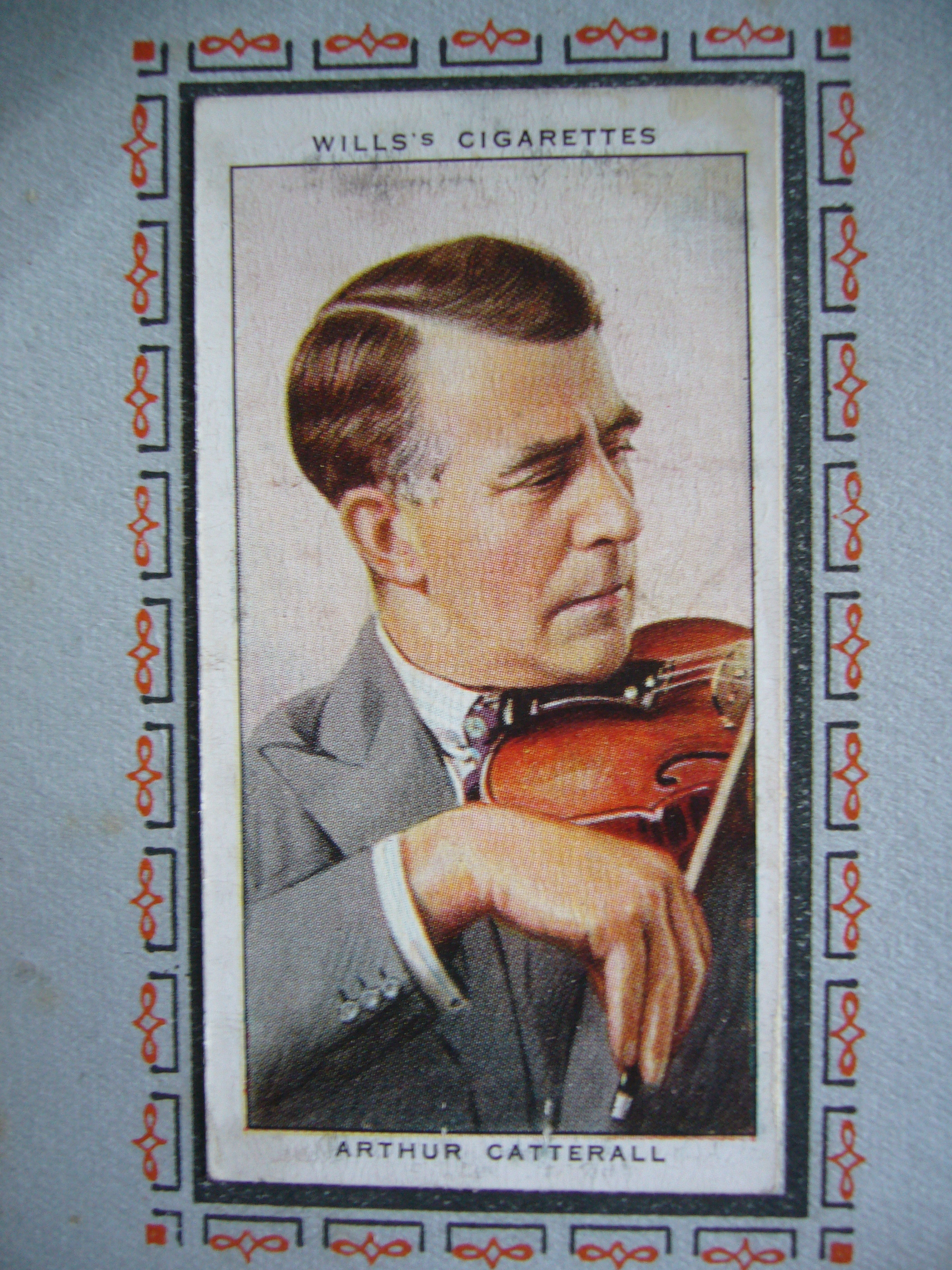
photo of Wills's cigarette card showing BBC Symphony Orchestra leader Arthur Catterall.

== Early training ==
Arthur Catterall was born in Preston, Lancashire, the son of John Catterall, a painter and his wife Elizabeth, a cotton weaver. He was an extremely gifted musician in childhood. He first played the violin in public at a concert in Preston when he was 6 years old. He played the Mendelssohn violin concerto in Manchester at the age of 9. Catterall received his elementary education under the Jesuits at St Ignatius Roman Catholic School, Preston until 1893 when he was accepted as a Boarder at St Bede's College, Manchester, during this time he also studied at the Royal Manchester College of Music under Willy Hess in 1894 and under Adolph Brodsky in 1895. Catterall graduated from St Bede's at the age of 16 in 1898.

In 1902, at the age of 18, he was invited to Bayreuth by Hans Richter and played at all of Cosima Wagner's musical evenings in that season. He appeared at a Hallé Orchestra concert in 1903 playing Tchaikovsky's concerto.

== Orchestral leader ==
In 1909 Catterall became leader of the promenade concerts at the Queen's Hall. In 1911 he acquired the violin made by Jean Baptiste Vuillaume, c. 1843, which had belonged to Ferdinand David. In 1907 he was appointed Professor of violin at the Royal Manchester College of Music (a post he held for many years) and became leader of the Hallé Orchestra, where he remained until 1925. In 1913 he obtained the 'Baillot-Pommereau' 1694 instrument by Antonio Stradivarius, and in September of that year performed the Violin Concerto BV 243 of Ferruccio Busoni with the Queen's Hall Orchestra under Henry Wood. He later gave the English premiere, also at a prom, of the (1911–1912) Violin concerto of Samuel Coleridge-Taylor, which had been dedicated to Maud Powell.

== Chamber music ==
In addition to his orchestral and teaching work, Catterall was active in chamber music throughout his career. In 1915 Frederick Delius wrote a Sonata for violin and piano for Catterall and the pianist R.J. Forbes. He led the Catterall Players, an ensemble for chamber performance, which performed the Elgar quintet in 1921. He had connections with the London Chamber Music Players (led by Albert Sammons), with the pianist William Murdoch (pianist) and 'cellist W. H. Squire, and in 1910 founded and led a string quartet under his own name, known as the Catterall Quartet. In this John S. Bridge played 2nd violin, Frank S. Park (viola) and Johan C. Hock (cello). Hans Keller described their work as 'imaginative'. From 1926 to 1931 Laurance Turner was second violin in the quartet.

The quartet made recordings for His Master's Voice in the early 1920s, including Beethoven's op 18 nos 1 (1922–1923) and 2 (1923–1924), Arensky 2nd Quartet op 35a, and the Brahms Quartet no 1 (June 1923). They also recorded Beethoven op 130 at full length by the acoustic process, but this remained unissued. Catterall also played in a Trio called The Manchester Trio.

At the same time Catterall was recording for Columbia Records as a soloist in complete versions of Mozart's Concerto no 5 in A minor K219, and Bach's concerto for two violins with John S. Bridge, both under the direction of Hamilton Harty, c. 1924. The quartet also transferred to recording for Columbia. He recorded the Brahms violin sonata in D minor with Murdoch in November 1923. He also recorded by the electrical microphone process after 1925. In the 1933 Columbia catalogue the standard recording of Tchaikovsky's Trio no 2, op 50 (on 12 sides) was by Catterall, Murdoch and Squire.

== Move to London ==
After many years teaching at the Manchester College, Catterall became professor at the Royal Academy of Music in London. Among his pupils were Harry Blech, Margaret Jones Wiles, Walter Appleyard, Eugene Genin, Arthur Leavins, Laurance Turner, Gloria Pashley, and also Olive Zorian (1916–1965) (founder and leader of the Zorian Quartet which pioneered works by Michael Tippett in 1943–44 and those of Britten soon afterwards). After leaving the Hallé orchestra he concentrated on solo work, performing for example the Beethoven concerto under Thomas Beecham with the London Symphony Orchestra in March 1927. He also developed as a conductor, taking the third concert of the 1929 Delius Festival at the Queen's Hall (Eventyr, Cynara, Piano concerto, Arabesk and Appalachia).

In 1929, Catterall became the founding leader of the BBC Symphony Orchestra, though the proms were at first led by his assistant violin Charles Woodhouse. When the orchestra first appeared in full strength (115 players), on 22 October 1930, at the Queen's Hall in its inaugural concert with the Flying Dutchman overture, Brahms' Fourth Symphony, the Saint-Saëns cello concerto (with Guilhermina Suggia) and Ravel's Symphonic Fragments from Daphnis et Chloé, under Adrian Boult, Catterall led the orchestra.

In 1932, Granville Bantock dedicated his second violin sonata to Catterall (the first having been to Albert Sammons). Catterall retired from his position with the BBC Orchestra in 1936, to devote his time to solo work and teaching. He formed another chamber orchestra for young string players, The Catterall String Orchestra, led from 1940 to 1943 by Audrey Catterall (born 1917).

He remained busy into the first years of the war, still a champion of contemporary composers. He performed the Brahms double concerto (with cellist Thelma Reiss) and gave the English premiere of Felix Weingartner's Sinfonietta (with Reiss and violist Bernard Shore) under Weingartner's baton at a Royal Philharmonic concert in February 1939. He was memorably associated with the cellist Antonia Butler in a prom performance at the Queen's Hall of the Brahms double concerto in August 1940. After an air-raid warning was heard and the audience was obliged to remain indoors, the musicians improvised an all-night concert. The work of the Catterall Quartet (with Audrey Catterall as second violin) continued, for on 5 February 1942 it gave the first performance of the String Quartet in G minor ('Kenilworth'), op 99, by Armstrong Gibbs at Windermere. On 8 July 1942 he gave the world premiere of the Violin concerto dedicated to him by E.J. Moeran, under Henry Wood, and repeated his performance, with Wood, for the Royal Philharmonic concert of 5 December 1942.

He died in London in November 1943: Moeran was present at the death or soon after. An Arthur Catterall Cup for violin or viola concerto performance is competed for in the Feis Ceoil.
