= York Bowen =

English composer and pianist (1884–1961)

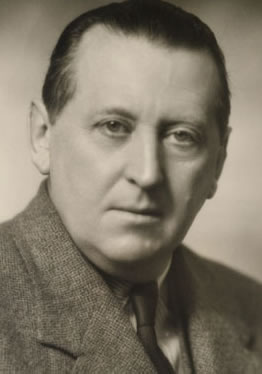
- 1935

Background information
- Born: 22 February 1884; Crouch Hill, London, England
- Died: 23 November 1961 (aged 77) Hampstead, London, England
- Occupations: Composer; Pianist
- Instruments: Piano; Organ; Violin; Viola; French horn

Edwin York Bowen (22 February 1884 – 23 November 1961) was an English composer and pianist. Bowen's musical career spanned more than fifty years during which time he wrote over 160 works. As well as being a pianist and composer, Bowen was a talented conductor, organist, violist and horn player. Despite achieving considerable success during his lifetime, many of the composer's works remained unpublished and unperformed until after his death in 1961. Bowen's compositional style is widely considered ‘Romantic’ and his works are often characterized by their rich harmonic language.

== Biography ==
Bowen was born in Crouch Hill, London, to a father who was the owner of the whisky distillers Bowen and McKechnie. The youngest of three sons, Bowen began piano and harmony lessons with his mother at an early age. His talent was recognised almost immediately and he soon began his musical education at the North Metropolitan College of Music. He subsequently went on to study at the Blackheath Conservatoire of Music with Alfred Izard.

In 1898, at the age of fourteen, Bowen gained an Erard scholarship to the Royal Academy of Music. He studied there until 1905, learning composition with Frederick Corder and piano with Tobias Matthay. While studying at the Royal Academy of Music, Bowen won numerous awards including the Sterndale Bennett Prize in 1902 and the Worshipful Company of Musicians Medal. In 1907 Bowen was awarded a fellowship to the Royal Academy of Music and two years later was appointed professor.

In 1912 Bowen married Sylvia Dalton, a singer and the daughter of a Somerset vicar. Their son Philip was born a year later. During the First World War Bowen played in the Scots Guards Band but during service in France he contracted pneumonia and was forced to return to the UK. Bowen returned to composing and performing after the war and continued to work as a teacher, examiner, lecturer and adjudicator. He taught at the Tobias Matthay Piano School for over forty years and remained a professor at the Royal Academy of Music until his death in 1961. Among his students were Myers Foggin, Derek Holman, Joan Mary Last, Charles Lynch, Ivor Newton, Kathleen Richards, Betty Roe, Leo Rowlands and Timothy Salter.

Bowen was awarded several prizes for composition including the Sunday Express Prize for March RAF (1919) and Chappell's Orchestral Suite Prize and the Hawkes and Co. Prize for Intermezzo (1920).

== Musical career ==
Bowen achieved considerable success during his lifetime both as a concert pianist and composer. He performed regularly at both the Queen's Hall and the Royal Albert Hall. As a pianist he was recognised for his technical ability and artistic excellence.

Bowen premiered many of his own works including all four of his piano concertos. He produced his first three piano concertos between 1904 and 1908, performing the Piano Concerto No. 1 in E♭ major, Op. 11, at the Proms under Henry Wood and the Piano Concerto No. 4 in A minor, Op. 88, under the direction of Adrian Boult. During his lifetime many of Bowen's orchestral works were also performed by other prominent conductors. In 1903 Henry Wood conducted Bowen's symphonic poem The Lament of Tasso, Op. 5, in 1906 Hans Richter performed the Symphonic Fantasia in F major, Op. 16, and in 1912 Landon Ronald directed the Symphony No. 2 in E minor, Op. 31.

Many of Bowen's instrumental works were dedicated to and premiered by renowned musicians. In 1910 Fritz Kreisler performed the Suite in D minor for Violin and Piano, Op. 28, and many other renowned violinists of the time later gave performances of the work, including Joseph Szigeti, Michael Zacharewitsch and Efrem Zimbalist. The celebrated violinist Marjorie Hayward performed Bowen's Violin Concerto in E minor, Op. 33, at the Proms in 1920 and the first performances of Sonata for Horn and Piano, Op. 101, and Concerto for Horn, Strings and Timpani, Op. 150, were given by Aubrey Brain and Dennis Brain respectively. Bowen also composed works for many of his other contemporaries including Carl Dolmetsch, Léon Goossens, Beatrice Harrison, Pauline Juler and Gareth Morris.

As an instrumentalist, Bowen considered the tone quality of the viola to be superior to the violin, and composed numerous works for viola. Bowen frequently performed as a pianist alongside the viola player Lionel Tertis and in 1908 Tertis premiered Bowen's Viola Concerto in C minor, Op. 25. Bowen also aided Tertis in his campaign to increase the popularity of the viola as a solo instrument. Bowen made numerous other contributions to the viola repertoire, including the Fantasy Quartet for four violas and two sonatas for viola and piano. Alongside Arnold Bax and Benjamin Dale, Bowen was one of the first English composers to add original works to the modern viola repertoire. Bowen also wrote three traditional string quartets, the second (of 1918) published in 1922 as part of the Carnegie Collection of British Music, and a Phantasy Quintet for string quartet and bass clarinet in 1932.

Aside from his performances with Lionel Tertis, one of Bowen's most successful collaborations was the piano duo that he formed with fellow professor at the Royal Academy of Music, Harry Isaacs. As a composer Bowen was noted for his inventive piano duets and he continued to perform many of these compositions with Isaacs throughout his career.

As well as premiering many of his own works, including his four piano concertos, Bowen also gave many first performances of piano works by other composers. In 1907 he performed alongside Henry Wood and Frederick Kiddle to give the first British performance of Mozart's Concerto for Three Pianos and Orchestra in F major, K. 242. Similarly, in 1928 Bowen gave the first performance of William Walton's Sinfonia Concertante for Orchestra and Piano at a Royal Philharmonic Society concert at the Queen's Hall.

He was the first pianist to record Beethoven's Piano Concerto No. 4 in G major.

During his lifetime Bowen also published editions of works by other composers. These included a three volume edition of Mozart's piano works published between 1931 and 1932. In addition, Bowen produced editions of many of Chopin's nocturnes, preludes, valses, ballades and scherzos between 1948 and 1950.

== Compositional style ==
Bowen's compositions each display a unique 'blend of Romanticism and strong individuality'. Although his influences include Rachmaninoff, Medtner, Chopin, Grieg and Tchaikovsky, Bowen's music is very much defined by its distinctive textures and harmonies. Although his active career spanned more than fifty years, Bowen's compositional style altered very little and he continued to employ a diatonic key system with use of chromatic harmonies throughout his life.

Bowen's compositional output is made up almost entirely of instrumental works. Although he wrote for numerous different instrumental combinations, the piano features prominently in many of his works. Despite this, Bowen's varied instrumental proficiencies are evident in his technical and musical understanding of individual instrumental capabilities.

The varying standards of difficulty of his compositions make Bowen's instrumental music accessible to a wide range of musicians. This is particularly true of Bowen's piano works which span from study pieces such as Twelve Easy Impromptus, Op. 99. to the extreme technical virtuosity of works such as Sonata No. 5 in F minor, Op. 72.

Many of Bowen's piano works are aimed at improving piano technique. One of his most notable works, Twenty-Four Preludes, Op. 102, is set in all major and minor keys and his Twelve Studies, Op. 46, are also intended to address different elements of piano technique. Bowen dedicated the studies to his piano teacher at the Royal Academy of Music, Tobias Matthay, who had written several books about various aspects of fore-arm rotation and piano touch. Each of Bowen's studies deals with a different aspect of piano technique discussed in Matthay's books. Inspired by Matthay's innovative approaches, Bowen later produced two books on piano technique: Pedalling the Modern Piano Forte (London, 1936) and The Simplicity of Piano Technique (London, 1961)

== Reception ==
During his early career Bowen achieved considerable success as both a composer and concert pianist. After hearing the premiere of Bowen's Piano Concerto No. 1 in E♭ major, Op. 11 in 1903, Camille Saint-Saëns hailed Bowen as 'the finest of English composers'. This opinion was shared by many of Bowen's contemporaries and is reflected in the support he received from many eminent musicians and academics.

Despite Bowen's success during the years before the First World War, by the time he wrote his Piano Concerto No. 4 in A minor, Op. 88, in 1929, his romantic compositional style was considered outdated in relation to the modern techniques of his contemporaries. In his autobiography published in 1938, Henry Wood protested that Bowen had 'never taken the position he deserves'. In 1960 the record label Lyrita asked Bowen to record performances of some of his own works, including 10 of the 24 Preludes and the newly composed Partita, Op. 156.

Following his death in 1961, many of Bowen's compositions remained unpublished. As a result of this, performances of Bowen's works diminished and much of his music remained unperformed in the decades after his death. During this time one of Bowen's most enthusiastic advocates was the composer and pianist Kaikhosru Shapurji Sorabji, to whom Bowen had dedicated his Twenty-Four Preludes, Op. 102. The increase in publications and performances of Bowen's works during the late twentieth century was also largely due to the work done by the York Bowen Society. The revival of interest in Bowen's music during the 1980s was also influenced by the publication of Monica Watson's book York Bowen: A Centenary Tribute (Thames, London, 1984) as well as numerous recordings made of Bowen's works.

Despite the advancements made by the York Bowen Society, many of the composer's works remain unpublished. Although many of Bowen's solo instrumental works contribute significantly to modern performance repertoire, his orchestral and chamber works are rarely performed.

== Selected recordings ==
- British Music for Viola and Piano, Phantasy in F Major. Izabel Markova (viola), Alla Belova (piano). Claves CD3073 (2024)
- Cello Sonata, Op. 64 – Jo Cole (Cello), John Talbot (piano) BMS
- Concerto for Horn, Strings and Timpani, Op. 150 – David Pyatt (Horn), London Philharmonic Orchestra (Nicholas Braithwaite) Lyrita
- Concerto for Viola and Orchestra in C minor, Op.25 – Doris Lederer/Paul Polivnick, Czech Philharmonic Chamber Orchestra (2005)
- Concerto for Viola and Orchestra in C minor, Op. 25 – Lawrence Power (viola), BBC Scottish SO (Martyn Brabbins) Hyperion
- Concerto for Viola and Orchestra in C minor, Op. 25 – Diyang Mei (viola), Deutsche Radio Philharmonie/Brett Dean (2024)
- Fragments from Hans Andersen, Op. 58/61 – also Concert Studies Nos 1 and 2, Twelve Studies, Op. 46. Nicolas Namoradze (piano). Hyperion CDA68303 (2021)
- Miniature Suite, Op. 113 for wind quintet (1944), Burlesque and Debutante (1956). Camarilia Ensemble, Dutton Epoch CDLX 7398 (2022)
- Piano Concertos Nos 3 (Fantasia) and 4 – Danny Driver (piano), BBC Scottish SO (Martyn Brabbins) Hyperion
- Piano Sonatas (complete) – Danny Driver (piano), Hyperion
- Portraits of Bowen, 24 Preludes, Rêverie Op. 86, Zazra. Nuron Mukumi (piano). Prospero PROSP0106 (2024)
- Suite for Four Cellos (1930), Cellophonics, SOMMCD0731 (2026)
- Suite Mignonne: Moto Perpetuo, Op. 39, Toccata, Op. 155 – Stephen Hough (Piano) Hyperion
- Symphonies No. 1 and 2. BBC Philharmonic, conducted by Andrew Davis. Chandos CHAN 10670 (2011)
- Symphony No. 2 in E minor, Op. 31 – Royal Northern College of Music SO (Douglas Bostock) Classico
- Three Duos, Shirley Turner (violin), Peter Mallinson (viola), A Musical Soirée, Meridian CDE84686 (2026)
- Twenty-Four Preludes, Op. 102, Ballade No. 2, Op. 87, Sonata No. 5 in F minor, Op. 72, Berceuse, Op. 83. Stephen Hough (piano). Hyperion CDA66838 (1996)
- Twenty-Four Preludes, Op. 102 – Suite Mignonne, Op. 39 – Berceuse, Op. 83. Cristina Ortiz (piano) Grand Piano Records GP 637 (2014)
- York Bowen Music for organ, viola, violin and harp – Fantasias for organ (1903, 1904, 1951), Poem for viola, harp and organ, Op.27 (1911), Three Duos for violin and viola - Dutton Epoch SACD CDLX7421 (2025)
- York Bowen Sonatas – Sonata for Flute and Piano, Op. 120, Sonata for Oboe and Piano, Op. 85, Sonata for Clarinet and Piano, Op. 109, Sonata for Horn and Piano, Op. 101 – Endymion. Dutton Epoch (2004)
- York Bowen Works for Piano Vol 1 – Sonata No. 6 in B♭ minor, Op. 160, Twenty-Four Preludes, Op. 102, Reverie, Op. 86 – Joop Celis. Chandos CHAN 10277 (2005)
- York Bowen Works for Piano Vol 2 – Sonata No. 5, Nocturne, Op. 78, Ripples, Op. 100 No. 1, Two Preludes, Fantasia, Op. 132, Two Intermezzi, Op. 141, Siciliano and Toccatina, Op. 128, Four Bagatelles, Op. 147, Evening Calm. Joop Celis. Chandos CHAN 10410 (2007)
