= André Mangeot =

Violinist and impresario (1883 - 1970)

André Louis Mangeot (25 August 1883 – 11 September 1970) was a French-born violinist and impresario who later became naturalised in England. André's father was the piano-maker Edouard Mangeot.

== Life ==
Born in Paris, Mangeot studied at the Conservatoire de Paris before settling in London, where he played initially in the Queen’s Hall Orchestra and at Covent Garden. In 1910 he married Olive Fowke, from whom he was divorced in 1931.

He founded the International String Quartet in 1919, to which he invited the young John Barbirolli to become its cellist. This specialised in modern works, especially by French and British composers. They performed the British première of Fauré’s Quartet op.121 in October 1925, made the first recording of Maurice Ravel’s String Quartet in 1927, and collaborated in the first (broadcast) performance of Benjamin Britten’s Phantasy Quartet in 1933. Later he formed the André Mangeot Quartet in 1947.

Mangeot also acted as violin teacher to a number of students who went on to make a name for themselves as musicians, among them Imogen Holst and Anne Macnaghten. Later he summed up the essence of his instruction in his book Violin technique: notes for players and teachers.
