= List of compositions by Eugene Aynsley Goossens =

This table of works by the English composer Eugene Aynsley Goossens initially lists them by opus number. They are sortable by other criteria, such as title, key, year of composition, and text authors.

== Table of compositions ==
Compositions by Eugene Aynsley Goossens
Op.	Title	Category	Key	Scoring	Year	Genre	Text	Comments
1	Variations on a Chinese Theme for orchestra	Orchestra			1911	Variations		27 minutes + (ABC Classics cd)
2	Miniature Fantasy for string orchestra	String Orchestra			1911	Fantasy		8 minutes
3	Symphonic Poem “Perseus”	Orchestra			1912	Symphonic Poem		
4, No.1	Old Chinese Folk-Song From the Yang-Tse-Kiang	Chamber		violin or cello, piano	1912	Folk Song		Dedication: Achille Rivarde, Esq.
5	“The Eternal Rhythm” for orchestra	Orchestra			1913	Symphonic Poem		20 minutes + (ABC Classics cd)
6	Suite	Chamber		flute, violin, harp (or 2 violins, piano)	1914	Suite		Dedication to Miriam Timothy
7	5 Impressions of a Holiday Cinq impressions d'un séjour à la campagne	Chamber		violin (or flute), cello, piano	1916	Impressions		
8								
9	2 Mélodies Two Songs, Deux mélodies	Songs		voice (soprano or tenor), piano	1914	Song Romantic		
10	Concert Study	Piano	C major	piano		Study		3 minutes. Dedication: Winifred Christie (1882–1965)
11								
12	Phantasy Quartet	String Quartet		2 violins, viola, and cello	1915	Fantasy		1 movement. Dedication: To my friends, the London String Quartet (1st Violin: Albert Sammons 2nd Violin: Thomas W. Petre Viola: Harry Waldo Warner Cello: Charles Warwick Evans)
13	Rhapsody	Chamber		cello, piano	1917	Rhapsody		Dedication: Warwick-Evans
14	String Quartet	String Quartet	C major		1915			25 minutes. Dedication: Colleagues of the Philharmonic String Quartet--Arthur Beckwith (1st Violin), Raymond Jeremy (Viola), Cedric Sharpe (Cello)
15, No.1	“By the Tarn” for string orchestra	String Orchestra			1919	Sketch		5 minutes + (EMI cd)
15, No.2	“Jack O’Lantern” for string orchestra (Ignis fatuus)	String Orchestra			1919	Sketch		
16	2 Proses Lyriques	Songs		voice, piano	1917	Song	Edwin Evans (1844-1923)	Dedication: G. Jean-Aubry
17	Persian Idylls	Songs		voice, piano	1918	Song	Edwin Evans (1844-1923)	Dedication: To my friend Maurice d'Oisly
17a	“Tam O’Shanter”-Scherzo after Burns for orchestra	Orchestra			1918	Scherzo		
18	Kaleidoscope 12 Short Pianoforte Pieces	Piano		piano	1917			Dedication: Miss d'Erlanger
19	Three Songs	Songs		voice, piano	1917		1, 3. Jean-Frédéric-Emile Aubry) (1882-1950) as G. Jean-Aubry; 2. Edwin Evans (1844-1923)	Dedication: 1. Adolfo Salazar; 3. à Madame Alvar
20	4 Conceits	Piano		piano	1917	Conceit		8 minutes. Dedication: To William Murdock
21	Violin Sonata No.1	Violin	E minor	violin, piano	1919	Sonata		25 minutes. Dedication: Albert Sammons
22	Philip II	Orchestra			1918-19	Prelude		10 minutes. Incidental music for Emile Verhaeren's "Philip II."
22b	The Curse	Songs	E minor	voice, piano	1921	Song	Herbert Reginald Barbor (1893-1933)	Dedication: Pedro Morales
23	Piano Quintet	Piano Quintet	G minor	2 violins, viola, cello, piano	1921			Dedication: To my friend George Davison
24								
25	Nature Poems	Piano		piano	1919	Poem		Dedication: To Benno Moiseiwitsch
26	3 Songs Three songs with string quartet accompaniment	Songs	F major, E♭ minor, C major	voice, 2 violins, viola, cello	1920	Song	1. Thomas Wyatt (1503-1542); 2. John Fletcher (1579-1625); 3. Richard Barnefield (1574-1627)	
27								
28	Hommage à Debussy	Piano		piano	1920	Hommage		
29	L'Ecole en crinoline	Piano		piano		Ballet		
30	Rhythmic Dance for orchestra	Orchestra			1927	Dance		3 minutes
31	Silence A choral fragment	Orchestra, Vocal		chorus (SSAATTBB), orchestra	1922	Fragment	Walter De la Mare (1873-1956)	Composed expressly for the Three Choirs Musical Festival, Gloucester, 1922.
32								
33	Suite from 'East of Suez' Suite from the Incidental Music to 'East of Suez'	Orchestra		orchestra	1922	Suite	W. Somerset Maugham (1874-1965)	Commissioned by director Basil Dean
34	Sinfonietta				1922			15 minutes
35	Lyric Poem for Violin and Orchestra							7 minutes
36	Fantasy for 9 wind instruments							
37	Phantasy Sextet	Chamber		3 violins, viola, 2 cellos, [double bass (ad lib.)]	1923	Fantasy		20 minutes. Dedication: Elizabeth Sprague Coolidge
38 No.1	Two Studies / Ballades: 1. Folk Tune (Sheep-Shearing Song)	Piano		piano	1923	Study / Ballade		2:48 “Sheep Shearing Song” was collected in Somerset by English folk-musicologist Cecil Sharp in 1904 from the singing of William King
38 No.2	Two Studies / Ballades: 2. Scherzo	Piano		piano	1923	Study / Ballade		2:56
39								
40	Variations on “Cadet Rousselle” for orchestra	Orchestra			1930	Variations		3 minutes + (Dutton cd). Arranged by Arnold Bax, Frank Bridge, John Ireland and Eugene Goossens; orchestrated by Eugene Goossens
41	Pastorale et Arlequinade for flute, oboe, and piano	Chamber		flute, oboe, piano				8 minutes. Chandos CD
42	Ships, three preludes for piano	Piano				Prelude		
43								
44	Three Greek Dances for small orchestra							14 minutes
45	Oboe Concerto	Concerto			1927-1929	Concerto		12 minutes + (ABC Classics and ASV cds cd). Dedicated to Léon Goossens
46	Judith An Opera in One Act	Opera			1929	Opera	Arnold Bennett	74 minutes
47	Concertino for string octet or string orchestra	String Octet, String Orchestra		string octet (or string orchestra)	1928	Concertino		13 minutes + (ABC Classics cd). Dedication: to my friend André Mangeot. 4 movements. IMSLP
48								
49								
50	Violin Sonata No. 2	Violin		violin, piano		Sonata		
51								
52								
53								
54	Don Juan de Mañara Opera in Four Acts	Opera			1935	Opera	Arnold Bennett	First performed in London at Covent Garden in 1937
55	Three Pictures for Flute and Orchestra	Orchestra			1935	Picture		18 minutes
56	Two pieces	Piano		piano				
57	Romance	Violin		violin, piano				
58	Symphony No.1	Orchestra			1940	Symphony		
59	String Quartet No.2	String Quartet	C major	2 violins, viola, cello	1942			32 minutes. Dedicated to my dear friend Elizabeth Sprague Coolidge, on her birthday, October 30th, 1940
60	Phantasy Concerto for Piano and Orchestra	Concerto			1942	Fantasy		
61	Cowboy Fantasy for orchestra	Orchestra			1942	Fantasy		
62	Symphony No.2	Orchestra			1942-1944	Symphony		
63	Phantasy Concerto for Violin and Orchestra	Concerto			1948	Fantasy		
64	“The Apocalypse”	Oratoria		soprano, contralto, tenor, bass, double chorus and orchestra	1953	Oratoria	Revelation of St John the Divine	110 minutes
65	Concert Piece for two harps, oboe, cor anglais and orchestra	Concerto			1958	Concert Piece		
66	Divertissement for orchestra	Orchestra			1960	Divertissement		19 minutes
67	Islamite Dance	Chamber		oboe, piano	1962	Dance		2.5 minutes. Paris: Alphonse Leduc. IMSLP
69	Coronation Fanfare for orchestra	Orchestra			1953	Fanfare		
70	Victory(Jubilee) Fanfare and ‘God Save The Queen’ for orchestra	Orchestra			1945	Anthem		4 minutes
71	“Star-Spangled Banner” for orchestra	Orchestra			1953	Anthem		4 minutes
72	Scherzo Fantasque	Chamber		flute, piano	1962	Scherzo		2.5 minutes. Paris: Alphonse Leduc. A Chronological History of Australian Composers and Their Compositions - Vol. 2
73	Vieille Chanson à Boire	Chamber		bassoon, piano	1962	Drinking Song		2 minutes. Paris: Alphonse Leduc. A Chronological History of Australian Composers and Their Compositions - Vol. 2

== List of compositions ==
SIR EUGENE GOOSSENS: A CATALOGUE OF THE ORCHESTRAL AND CHORAL MUSIC

- 1911-12: Variations on a Chinese Theme for orchestra, op.1: 27 minutes + (ABC Classics cd)
- 1911: Miniature Fantasy for string orchestra, op.2: 8 minutes
- 1912: Symphonic Poem “Perseus”, op.3
- 1913: “The Eternal Rhythm” for orchestra, op.5: 20 minutes + (ABC Classics cd)
- 1916: Two Sketches for clarinet and strings: 7 minutes
- 1917: “Four Conceits” for orchestra, op.20: 8 minutes
- 1917-18: “Tam O’Shanter”-Scherzo after Burns for orchestra, op.17a: 3 minutes + (ABC Classics cd)
- 1919: “By the Tarn” for string orchestra, op.15, No.1: 5 minutes * + (EMI cd)
- “Jack O’Lantern” for string orchestra, op.15, No.2
- Prelude to “Philip II” for small orchestra, op.22: 9 minutes
- Lyric Poem for Violin and Orchestra, op.35: 7 minutes
- c.1922:“Silence”-A choral fragment for chorus and orchestra, op.31: 8 minutes
- 1922: Sinfonietta, op.34: 15 minutes
- 1923: Phantasy Sextet for Strings for string orchestra, op.37
- 1927: Rhythmic Dance for orchestra, op.30: 3 minutes
- Three Greek Dances for small orchestra, op.44: 14 minutes
- 1927-29:Oboe Concerto, op.45: 12 minutes + (ABC Classics and ASV cds cd)
- 1928: Concertino for double string orchestra, op.47: 13 minutes + (ABC Classics cd)
- 1929: “Judith” for orchestra (Ballet music from the Opera) + (Dutton cd)
- 1930: Variations on “Cadet Roussel” for orchestra: 3 minutes + (Dutton cd)
- 1933: Suite “Kaleidoscope” for orchestra, op.18: 9 minutes + (ABC Classics and Signum cds)
- 1935: Three Pictures for Flute and Orchestra, op.55: 18 minutes
- Intermezzo from “Don Juan de Manara” for orchestra: 5 minutes
- 1938-40:Symphony No.1, op.58: 39 minutes * + (ABC Classics and Chandos cds)
- 1942: Pastorale for string orchestra, op.59: 8 minutes
- Phantasy Concerto for Piano and Orchestra, op.60: 25 minutes + (Chandos cd)
- Cowboy Fantasy for orchestra, op.61
- 1943-45:Symphony No.2, op.62: 38 minutes * + (ABC Classics and Chandos cds)
- 1944: Fanfare for the Merchant Marine for brass ensemble and percussion, Duration: 3 minutes
- 1945: Victory(Jubilee) Fanfare and ‘God Save The Queen’ for orchestra: 4 minutes
- 1948: Phantasy Concerto for Violin and Orchestra, op.63: 22 minutes (Chandos cd)
- 1949 Iberia Suite, Three movements arranged for orchestra, Duration: 15 minutes
- 1953: Coronation Fanfare for orchestra
- “The Apocalypse” for soprano, contralto, tenor, bass, double chorus and orchestra, op.64: 110 minutes *
- 1956-60: Divertissement for orchestra, op.66: 18 minutes + (ABC Classics cd)
- 1958: Concert Piece for two harps, oboe, cor anglais and orchestra, op.65: 22 minutes + (ABC Classics cd)
- “Star-Spangled Banner” for orchestra: 4 minutes
- Two Nature Poems for orchestra: 12 minutes
- 1941: Hommage à Paderewski: 2:22
- 1960: Capriccio, piano: 2:33
- 1960: Forlane and toccata, piano: 2:28
- Sheep-Shearing Song, piano, op.38: No. 1. Folk-Tune: 3 minutes
