= Marjorie Hayward =

British violinist (1885–1953)

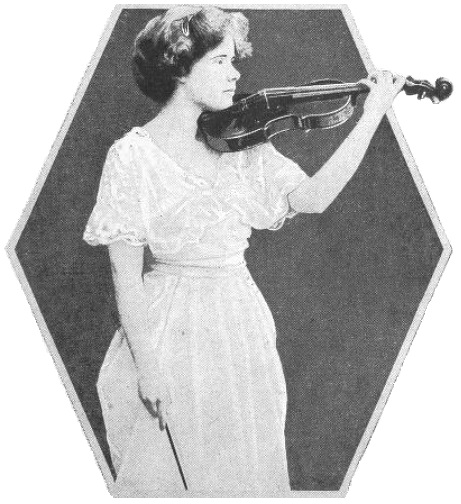
- Marjorie Hayward in 1926

Background information
- Born: Marjorie Olive Hayward; 14 August 1885; Greenwich
- Died: 10 January 1953 (aged 67) London
- Occupations: violinist violin teacher
- Instruments: violin

Marjorie Olive Hayward (14 August 1885 – 10 January 1953) was an English violinist and violin teacher, prominent during the first few decades of the 20th century.

== Biography ==
Marjorie Hayward was born in Greenwich in 1885. An "infant prodigy", her violin studies were with Émile Sauret at the Royal Academy of Music in London (1897–1903), and Otakar Ševčík in Prague (1903–06). Her two years in Prague were paid for by the sale of the family home: Hayward later expressed her gratitude for this and other support from her musical mother.

She had early successes in the concerto repertoire, performing in Prague, Berlin (where she played Ethel Smyth's Concerto for Violin, Horn and Orchestra with Aubrey Brain), Paris, Amsterdam and the Hague, but later focussed mainly on chamber music.

She was the dedicatee of John Ireland's short 1911 piece for violin and piano titled Bagatelle. She and the composer premiered his Violin Sonata No. 1 in D minor on 7 March 1913 at a Thomas Dunhill Chamber Concert at Steinway Hall.

She was also the dedicatee of her teacher Émile Sauret's 24 Etudes Caprices, Op. 64, and Thomas Dunhill's 3 Pieces for Violin and Piano, Op.17.

She led the English String Quartet (which included Frank Bridge on viola), and later the Virtuoso Quartet, the first chamber music group formed specifically for making recordings, with Edwin Virgo (2nd violin), Raymond Jeremy (viola) and its founder Cedric Sharpe (cello). The Quartet did not confine itself to recordings but also broadcast and toured frequently, its repertoire extending to quintets with artists such as Harriet Cohen, William Murdoch, Arnold Bax and Léon Goossens.

Marjorie Hayward also played in the Marie Dare String Quartet in the late 1930s, and created her own ensemble, the Marjorie Hayward String Quartet, with Irene Richards (2nd violin), Anatol Mines (viola) and May Mukle (cello). And there was the English Ensemble, with May Mukle, Rebecca Clarke (viola), and Kathleen Long (piano). Other groups in which she played a prominent role were the English Ensemble Piano Quartet and the Kamaran Trio. The latter was formed in 1937, with the cellist Antonia Butler and the pianist Kathleen Markwell.

Marjorie Hayward was a frequent face at The Proms, playing there 26 times between 1909 and 1944. At a Proms concert on 28 September 1920 she premiered the Violin Concerto in E minor, Op. 33 by York Bowen. Other works she played at the Proms included:

- Bach (Double Concerto; Concerto in E)
- Brahms (Double Concerto)
- Haydn (Concerto No. 4 in G)
- Paul Juon (Episodes concertantes, Op. 45)
- Mozart (Concertos Nos. 5, 6)
- Saint-Saëns (Concerto No. 3; Introduction and Rondo capriccioso)

and the concertos by Beethoven and Mendelssohn.

She was a Fellow of the RAM, and became a Professor there in 1924. The RAM's Marjorie Hayward Award is named in her honour.

She married R. G. K. (Rudolf Gustav Karl) Lempfert CBE (b. 1875), Director of the Meteorological Office and in 1930–31 President of the Royal Meteorological Society. Their daughter, Marjorie Lempfert, studied at the RAM, becoming a distinguished viola player and, like her mother, a professor at the Academy.

Marjorie Hayward died in London on 10 January 1953, aged 67.

== Recordings ==
There are many recordings of Marjorie Hayward's playing:

- abridged versions of Beethoven's "Kreutzer" Sonata, and the Franck and the Elgar sonatas, with Una Bourne
- sonatas by Mozart (K. 378) and Grieg (No. 3 in C minor, Op. 45)
- Purcell, Sonata in G minor, Z. 780, with Madame Adami
- Mozart: Violin Sonata, K.378, 1. Allegro
- a series of Lecture Illustrations with Sir Walford Davies
- Franck, String Quartet, Virtuoso String Quartet
- Saint-Saëns, Piano Quartet in B flat, Op.41 – Scherzo (with Mark Hambourg, piano; Frank Bridge, viola; C. Warwick-Evans, cello)
- Beethoven, E flat Quartet, Op.127, Virtuoso Quartet
- Dittersdorf, Minuet in E flat
- Mozart, "L'amerò, sarò costante", from Il re pastore, with Elisabeth Schumann
- There were also recordings of shorter works by Braga, D'Ambrosio, Fibich, Hubay, Kennedy-Fraser, Marcello, Mendelssohn, Poldini, Raff, Schumann, Simonetti, Stean, Tchaikovsky and Thomé.

She can be heard in the following YouTube links:

- Smetana, Bohemian Dance, Op. 15 on YouTube with Madame Adami
- Franck, Sonata in A major on YouTube (heavily abridged; with Una Bourne)
- Henry VIII Dances on YouTube
- Handel, Minuett on YouTube
- Bach-Gounod, Ave Maria on YouTube, accompanying Elsie Suddaby, with Reginald Paul, piano
- Ravel, Introduction and Allegro on YouTube, Virtuoso String Quartet, with John Cockerell, harp; Robert Murchie, flute; Charles Draper, clarinet
- Mendelssohn, Quartet in E flat, Op. 44/3 – Scherzo assai on YouTube
