= Eda Kersey =

British violinist (1904–1944)

Eda Kersey (15 May or 16 May 1904 – 13 July 1944) was a British violinist renowned for her brilliant playing. She premiered a number of important works, including the Bax Violin Concerto, but her career was cut short by her early death.

Eda Amy Kersey was born in Goodmayes, Essex on 15 May 1904, to John Clode Kersey and Alice Coles. Her father was a storekeeper at the West Ham Borough Asylum in Goodmayes, where Eda was born. Her father was an amateur violist, occasionally playing in concerts with Eda. She studied the violin from the age of six, winning an honours certificate from the Trinity College of Music when only eight. She studied with Edgar Mouncher, a pupil of Otakar Ševčík; under him, she prepared the first movement from Wieniawski's Violin Concerto No. 2 in D minor, which she played in Southampton when only ten. At 13, she commenced studies with Margaret Holloway, a pupil of Leopold Auer. She gave her first London recital at age 16 at the Aeolian Hall. The BBC engaged her to play the Mendelssohn, Beethoven and Elgar concertos and she gave the first broadcast of Dohnányi's Violin Concerto No. 1. She also performed the Beethoven concerto at the 1930 Proms under Sir Henry J. Wood. Later Proms performances included the Brahms and Bach A minor concertos.

Kersey formed her own string quartet in the 1920s known as the Kersey String Quartet which included her sister Rosalie, a cellist, pupil of Cedric Sharpe and early member of the BBC Symphony Orchestra. Her father John Clode Kersey also played with the quartet on occasion. In 1929 and 1930 Kersey played with the Ensemble Players, a trio formed of Kersey, Howard Ferguson and the cellist Helen Just.

In February 1930, she gave the first performance of Stanley Wilson's Violin Concerto, Op. 50, with the Birmingham Studio Symphony Orchestra conducted by the composer.

In 1931, she formed a piano trio with Gerald Moore and Cedric Sharpe, while continuing her solo career.

She became friendly with Albert Sammons, who encouraged her to overcome her dislike of the Elgar concerto and include it in her repertoire. She preferred works such as the violin sonatas of John Ireland, which she played with Kathleen Long. Her repertoire also included the Violin Concerto by Ernest Bloch. Kersey premiered Arthur Benjamin's Romantic Fantasy on 24 March 1938, with violist Bernard Shore, at a Royal Philharmonic Society concert conducted by the composer.

During World War II, she gave many performances for CEMA. In October 1939 she was one of the first artists to offer her services at the National Gallery Concerts. She and Kathleen Long were regular artists at Dame Myra Hess's National Gallery Lunchtime Concerts. In September 1942, along with Frederick Thurston (clarinet) and Ilona Kabos (piano), Kersey gave the first British performance of Bartok's Contrasts, which was composed in 1938 for Benny Goodman and Josef Szigeti.

Kersey also premiered E.J. Moeran's Violin Sonata, and gave the UK premiere of Samuel Barber's Violin Concerto at a 1943 Proms concert. In 1938, Arnold Bax had written his Violin Concerto for Jascha Heifetz, but Heifetz did not find it sufficiently challenging and never played it, so Bax put it aside. The work was given its premiere on 22 November 1943 by Eda Kersey and the BBC Symphony Orchestra under Sir Henry Wood, after Arthur Bliss, then the BBC's Director of Music, commissioned Bax to write a new work. She also recorded the concerto in February 1944, under Sir Adrian Boult.

Preparations to record some of the core concerto repertoire were well advanced when she died. Her death, from stomach cancer, occurred on 13 July 1944, at the age of 40. Elsie Suddaby sang at her memorial service. Her death was announced by the BBC in the 6 o'clock news on 13 July, and an appreciation of her by Gerald Moore, was broadcast at the same time.

After Kersey's death, an appeal to fund a prize in Kersey's name was made by notable musicians of the time including Dame Myra Hess, Sir Adrian Boult, Albert Sammons, Kathleen Long and Dr. Malcom Sargent. The prize became known as the Eda Kersey Memorial Exhibition and was awarded to a talented and deserving violinist at the Royal Academy of Music. Ivor McMahon was the first recipient in 1947.

Kersey's recordings are few: they include the Bax Concerto and pieces by Brahms, Fritz Kreisler, Jules Massenet and Jenő Hubay.
