= James Lockyer (musician) =

British violist (1883–1962)

- Born: James Thomas Lockyer; 23 July 1883; Greenwich, London, England
- Died: 15 October 1962 (aged 79) Northwood, Middlesex, England
- Genres: Classical
- Occupations: Musician, professor
- Instruments: Viola, Violin, Viola D’Amore
- Formerly of: Queen's Hall Orchestra, Beecham Orchestra, London Symphony Orchestra, British Chamber Music Players, Walenn String Quartet, Harpsichord Trio, Kutcher String Quartet

James Lockyer (1883–1962) was a British violist. He was the former principal violist of the Queen's Hall Orchestra and the Beecham Orchestra. He also played with the London Symphony Orchestra and the British Chamber Music Players, and was the violist in many string quartets and ensembles in the first half of the twentieth century.

== Biography ==
Lockyer's early musical studies were on the violin with Hans Wessely. With Wessely's encouragement Lockyer took up the viola, and was awarded The Ada Lewis Scholarship to study viola at the Royal Academy of Music in London with Lionel Tertis. He twice won the Charles Rube String Quartet Prize whilst a student at the RAM. His prize in 1904 was presented to him by Dame Nellie Melba. Lockyer later became a professor at the RAM and was made a Fellow of the Royal Academy of Music (FRAM) in July 1932.

In 1908, Lockyer, together with Tertis and fellow students Eric Coates and Phyllis Mitchell, gave the first performance of York Bowen’s Fantasie for Four Violas (Op.41 No.1). In 1911 he played alongside Pablo Casals in a performance of the Brahms Quintet in G (Op.111) at the Bechstein Hall in London. On 9 June 1911, at the Aeolian Hall, Lockyer, with Lionel Tertis, Eric Coates, Raymond Jeremy, Dorothy Jones and Phyllis Mitchell, gave the first performance of Benjamin Dale’s Introduction and Andante (Op.5) for six violas.

In 1912, Lockyer was asked to lead the violas at the concert to celebrate the official opening of the new Royal Academy of Music building in Marylebone Road. On 23 January 1914, Lockyer, along with Cedric Sharpe and the London String Quartet, gave the first public performance in Britain of Arnold Schoenberg's string sextet Verklärte Nacht, (Transfigured Night), at the Bechstein Hall. Schoenberg attended the performance and was also present at the first private performance which had been given by the Music Club at the Grafton Galleries on the 15th of the month.

During the First World War, Lockyer served as a Lieutenant in the Army Service Corps. After seventeen months duty in England, Lockyer was posted to Salonika in Macedonia. With a violin bought for £4 in Salonika, he continued playing at many concerts in the field.

Lockyer's early career was as principal violist of the Queen’s Hall and Beecham Orchestras and he later played with the London Symphony Orchestra from 1922 to 1925. He played in The Harpsichord Trio from 1932 to 1936, later to become the English Harpsichord Trio, with the harpsichordist John Venables Ticehurst, and Ambrose Gauntlett, a cellist and Viola Da Gamba player.

Lockyer played with numerous quartets and ensembles including the British Chamber Music Players, Walenn String Quartet, Faculty of Arts Quartet, Entente Quartet, Kutcher String Quartet(1925-1929), Brussels String Quartet, Philharmonic Quartet, The Wessely Quartet, Virtuoso Quartet and the London String Quartet.

Lockyer was the violist in the first London performance of William Walton's Quartet for Piano and Strings, on 30 October 1929, played in the Aeolian Hall by Lockyer with Pierre Tas (violin), John Gabalfa (cello) and Gordon Bryan (piano).

On 12 May 1937 he played in the orchestra for the Coronation of George VI and Elizabeth at Westminster Abbey, London.

In his later years, he was an examiner for the Associated Board of the Royal Schools of Music and was a member of the music panel for the Arts Council of Great Britain, retiring in 1950.

He played on a Maggini viola.
