= May Mukle =

British musician (1880–1963)

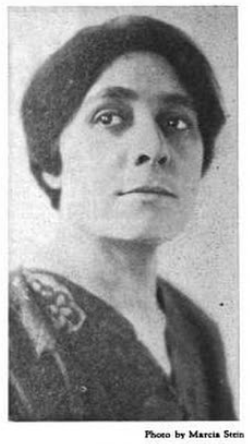
- May Mukle, from an advertisement published in 1919.
- Born: 14 May 1880; London
- Died: 20 February 1963 (aged 82); Cuckfield, Sussex
- Occupation: Cellist

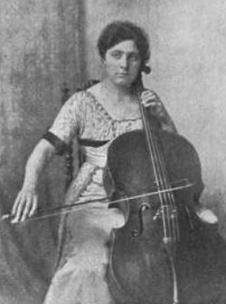
May Mukle with cello, from a 1919 publication.

May Henrietta Mukle FRAM (14 May 1880 – 20 February 1963) was a British cellist and composer. She has been described as a "noted feminist cellist", who encouraged other women cellists.

== Early life ==
Mukle was born in London, the daughter of Leopold Mukle and his second wife Nan Mukle. Her father was an immigrant from Rohrbach near Furtwangen in the Black Forest, Germany, who trained as a clockmaker, but was best known as an organ builder in London and part of the partnership Imhof & Mukle, which had its premises in Oxford Street. His two surviving sons followed him into the business. May's sisters — Anne (pianist), Lillian (trumpet), Flora (singer) and Louisa — were also musicians. She studied cello at the Royal Academy of Music with Alessandro Pezze (1835–1914).

== Career ==
Mukle was a working musician for over fifty years, including concert tours in Australia, Africa, and Asia. Her instrument was built by Montagnana and bought for her by an anonymous donor. Mukle was also a composer of works for cello and piano.

She performed as a soloist, and in chamber ensembles. She was a member of Rosabel Watson's Aeolian Ladies' Orchestra, and of the all-women English Ensemble, with violinist Marjorie Hayward, violist Rebecca Clarke, and pianist Kathleen Long. She toured around the world with Clarke in 1922-3. In 1925, Mukle played at New York's Aeolian Hall with Percy Grainger and Lionel Tertis. With her pianist sister, Anne Mukle, she was a member of the Maud Powell Trio, which toured South Africa and America. Also with Anne, she gave the first performance of Ralph Vaughan Williams' Six Studies in English Folk Song in London in 1926. She also performed in the Langley-Mukle Quartet with Beatrice Langley, Marjorie Hayward and James Lockyer, and in a Trio with Langley and York Bowen.

Mukle's apartment near Wigmore Hall was convenient for hosting visiting musicians; she also convinced the landlords to rent other apartments to musicians, so there would be fewer conflicts about noise. She founded the MM (Mainly Musicians) Club in a basement near Oxford Circus in London; during World War II, she converted it into a air raid shelter. She was an original member of the Society of Women Musicians, present at the organization's first meeting in 1911.

Mukle was described in The Times as "in the very front rank of living violoncellists", and her obituary in The Times says of her: "by the turn of the century she was fully recognized not only as an outstanding musician but as one of the most remarkable cellists this country had produced."

== Personal life and legacy ==
Mukle broke her wrist in a car accident in 1959, at age 79, but resumed playing after it healed, performing in North Carolina in 1960. She preferred to undertake her extensive journeying around the world by tramp steamer, returning from the last of them only a year before her death.

She died at Cuckfield, Sussex, in 1963, at the age of 82. Her portrait, painted by John Mansfield Crealock, is held in the museum of the Royal Academy of Music. The May Mukle Prize was founded in 1964 in her honour and is awarded each year to a cello student of the college.

== Musical family ==
- Leopold Mukle (1827–1913), German-born organ builder (Imhof & Mukle, founded 1852)
  - Anne Mukle (A.V. Mukle) (1866–1941), pianist, professionally active from the 1890s until 1940, founding member of the Society of Women Musicians, duo with cellist Lilly Phillips, trio with May Mukle and violinist Maud Powell
  - Flora Mukle (1872–1941), singer, flute
  - Lillian Mukle (1874–1951), trumpet, cornet, violin. Trained Guildhall School of Music
  - Louisa Mukle (1878–1926), viola, cello, double bass, percussion
  - May Mukle (1880–1963), cellist and composer

Leopold's two surviving sons, Fred Mukle (1877–????) and Stanley Herbert Mukle (1883-1970), followed their father into the family business. Stanley's daughter Nora Mukle married the composer Vernon Elliott. Their daughter Naomi (born 1938) became a cellist.
