= Kutcher =

Kutcher may refer to:

- Kutcher (surname)
- Kutcher Adolescent Depression Scale, psychological self-rating scale
- Mashd N Kutcher, Australian dance act and electronic band
- Kutcher String Quartet
