= Margaret Dare =

Scottish composer and cellist (1902–1976)

- Born: 4 February 1902; Newport-on-Tay, Scotland
- Died: 11 February 1976 (aged 74); Edinburgh, Scotland
- Other name: Marie Dare
- Education: Guildhall School of Music
- Occupation: musician
- Known for: Composition, Cellist

Margaret Marie Dare (4 February 1902 – 11 February 1976), usually known as Marie Dare, was a Scottish composer and cellist, born in Newport-on-Tay. She composed mostly chamber music, including several string quartets and a quintet. Some of her cello music written for educational purposes is still in use today.

== Life ==
Dare studied cello at the Guildhall School of Music under Charles Warwick Evans and W H Squire. She continued her cello studies in Paris with Paul Bazelaire and also took composition lessons at the Royal Academy of Music with Benjamin Dale. During her education she won the Gold Medal for Instrumentalists and the Sir Landon Ronald Prize.

While still a teenager, Dare made her professional cello debut on 1 July 1919 at the Aeolian Hall in London, and also performed as a soloist in a Victory Concert marking the end of World War 1 at the Royal Albert Hall. With the pianist Cecil Dixon she performed for early 2LO radio broadcasts from Marconi House in the early 1920s. In 1938 she formed the Maria Dare String Quartet, with Marjorie Hayward (violin), Susan Davies (violin) and Olive Davidson (viola), which broadcast regularly on BBC radio for the next few years.

After serving as a Petty Officer in the Women's Royal Navy Service during World War II, Dare was appointed principal cellist in the Reid Orchestra in Edinburgh, performing as the soloist in Tchaikovsky's Rococo Variations in 1946. She gave recitals in Budapest, London, and Vienna. In her later years, she performed in the Scottish Trio with Wight Henderson (piano) and Horace Fellows (violin). She worked as a professor of Cello at the Royal Scottish Academy of Music. In later life she also played and composed for the double bass. She lived at 32A Warrender Park Terrace, Edinburgh, where she died in February 1976.

== Composition ==
Dare composed mostly small scale chamber music, including a distinctive set of works for cello. There are six separate pieces for cello quartet, one of which (the Elégie) was published by Chester in 1956. She recorded these works with fellow cellists Antonia Butler, Helen Just and Olga Hegedus. Her Phantasy Quartet (1933) and Phantasy Quintet (with two cellos, 1933-4), both one movement works, along with the full scale String Quartet in G minor (1934-1937), were all heard at an Aeolian Hall concert devoted to her own compositions held on 19 January 1938, in which she performed as both cellist and pianist. Her 1939 Piano Trio won the Royal College of Music Society of Women Musicians composition prize. A number of her occasional pieces for cello, such as Serenade and Valse (Grade 2) and Echoes (Grade 5), still feature as ABRSM graded pieces for examination.

Other works include pieces for string orchestra (such as the late Scottish Rhapsody, commissioned by the Scottish Amateur Musical Association in 1972 for the National Youth String Orchestra of Scotland), three ballet scores (including For the Young Thumbeline, scored for two pianos and broadcast in 1964), as well as songs and choral works. Her colleague Ronald Stevenson commented on her "fine ear for national intonations". The Scottish Music Centre holds around 100 complete scores and 30 sound recordings.

The Hebridean Suite and three other pieces (Le Lac, Romance and The Spanish Shawl) for cello and piano were recorded by Alexandra Mackenzie and Ingrid Sawers in 2023. Her Phantasy Quartet of the 1930s was recorded in 2025 by The Berkeley Ensemble with Simon Callaghan (piano) and Tom Wraith (additional cello).

== Selected works ==
- The Four Maries, for four voices
- The Grey Geese, for voice & piano
- Hebridean Suite for cello and piano, six movements (1947)
- Highland Ballad for string orchestra
- Le Lac for cello and piano (1927)
- Menuet for double bass and piano
- Phantasy Quartet (1933)
- Phantasy Quintet (1933–34)
- Piano Trio in F (1939)
- Rhapsody for cello and piano (1970)
- Romance for cello and piano (1921)
- Scottish Rhapsody for string orchestra (1972)
- Serenade and Valse, cello and piano
- Six Pieces for Cello Quartet (1956-58)
  - 'Elégie'
  - 'Chant (Song)'
  - 'Valse'
  - 'Aria'
  - 'A Day Dream'
  - 'Rustic Dance'
- Sonatina (two movements) for string orchestra
- Strathspey for piano trio
- String Quartet in G minor (1934–37)
- Three Highland Sketches for string quartet (1939)
- Two Pastorales for string orchestra
- A Widow Bird Sate Mourning, part song, text Shelley
