= Kutcher (surname) =

Kutcher is an Americanized form of the German surname Kutscher, which is an occupational surname literally meaning "coachman". Notable people with the surname include:

- Ashton Kutcher (born 1978), American actor
- Demi Kutcher (born 1962), known as Demi Moore, American actress
- Justin Kutcher, American sportscaster
- Lorraine Kutcher (born 1938), Australian cricket player
- Randy Kutcher (born 1960), American baseball player
- Samuel Kutcher (1898–1984), Kutcher String Quartet violinist
- Stan Kutcher, Canadian senator and psychiatrist
- Steven R. Kutcher (born 1944), American entomologist
