= Kathleen Long =

British musician

Kathleen "Ida" Long CBE (7 July 1896 – 20 March 1968) was an English pianist and teacher.

== Early life ==
Long was born in Brentford, a suburb of London in the UK. Her early instruction in music, which began aged six, was with her aunt, Miss J. E. Long. She attended Langton House School in Bury St. Edmunds where she took further piano tuition with George W. Bouttell. She was a child prodigy who first performed in public at the age of seven and made her debut at the Aeolian Hall in 1915. From 1910 to 1916 she studied with Herbert Sharpe at the Royal College of Music in London.

== Career ==
Long was a teacher at the Royal College of Music from 1920 to 1964; her pupils included Imogen Holst and Eiluned Davies. She was a regular performer at the CEMA concerts during World War II, often with the violinist Eda Kersey. Others with whom she frequently appeared were Pablo Casals, Albert Sammons and Guilhermina Suggia, but her longest working partnership was with the violinist Antonio Brosa with whom she collaborated between 1948 and 1966. Her tours included Europe, North America and South Africa.

Long interpreted the music of (among many others) Mozart, Haydn and Bach,. She studied Ravel’s Ondine with the composer himself, made what was only the second recording of the Sonatine in 1927, and played and recorded works by Gabriel Fauré, with whose music she was particularly identified. In 1934 she performed in the premiere of Frank Bridge's Phantasm, drawing praise from the composer. In 1950 she was awarded the Palmes Académiques by the French Government for her services to French music. She was also created CBE for her "services to music" in 1957. Long was also a champion of new music, playing works of Madeleine Dring in concert sometimes before they had been published.

Long recorded regularly for Decca during the 1940s and 1950s. Dutch composer Gerard Schurmann composed his Bagatelles (1945) for her, which she premièred at the Concertgebouw.

== Personal life ==
Long's brother John Herbert Long was also a musician.

Long was the godmother to John Le Mesurier of Dad's Army fame.
