= Kutcher String Quartet =

String Quartet founded by violinist Samuel Kutcher (1898-1984)

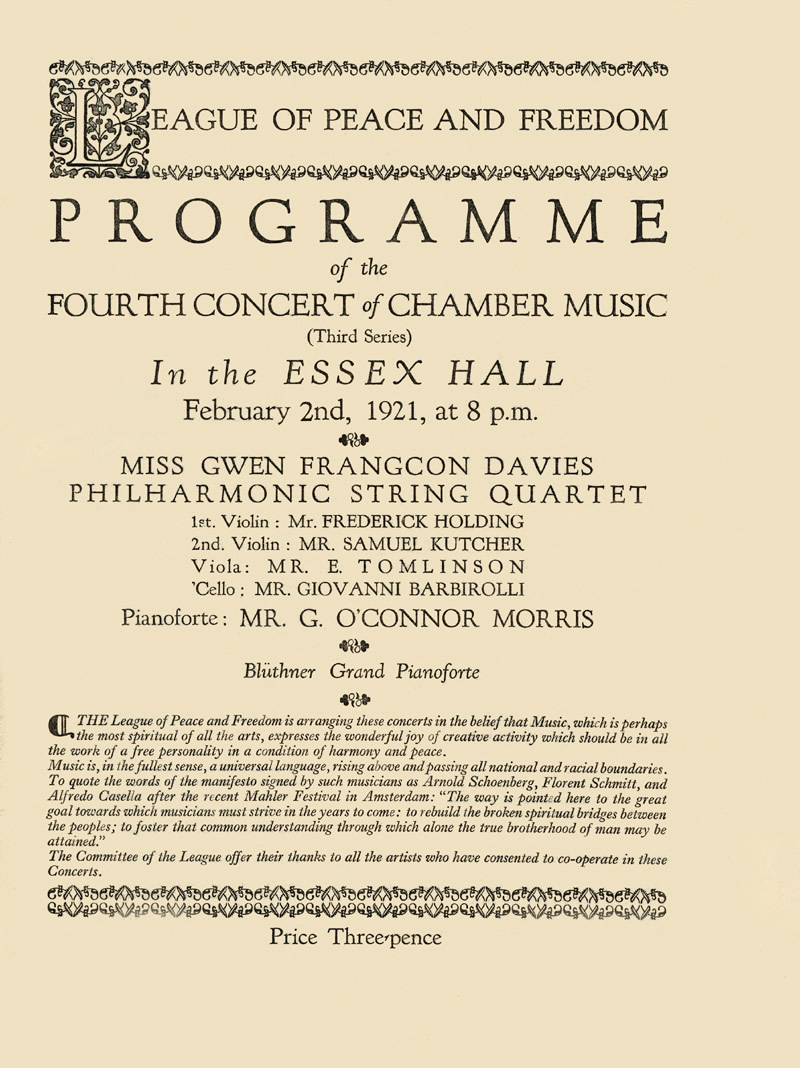

Samuel Kutcher early 1920s

The Kutcher String Quartet was founded by its first violinist, Samuel Kutcher (1898–1984), who had by 1922 established himself as an accomplished solo artist and the previous year been a member of the Philharmonic String Quartet, playing second violin, along with Frederick Holding (first violin), E. Thomlinson (viola) and Giovanni Barbirolli (cello).

There were plans for Samuel to join Albert Sammons and Lionel Tertis in a String Quartet to tour the UK, but it did not go ahead because the provinces could or would not pay the fees Sammons was asking. However, with encouragement from Albert Sammons and Giovanni Barbirolli, Samuel went on to form his own Quartet.

The Kutcher String Quartet's first public performance was in May 1922 at a concert at Wigmore Hall, London, where they accompanied the singer Edith Bartlett. The members of the Quartet in this first foray into the public arena were Samuel Kutcher, Julius Rosenthal (2nd violin), Frank Howard (viola), Giovanni Barbirolli, (and at later concerts) Ambrose Gauntlett (cello).

For the next year and a half they practiced in private. The Quartet re-emerged onto the London music scene in March 1924 with a concert for the South London Philharmonic Society, playing a Mozart String Quartet, and piano quintets by Schuman and Dvorak, accompanied by the pianist Lily Henkel. It was a concert in June the same year at the Aeolian Hall, London, when they fully came to the public's attention and critical acclaim, being likened to the Joachim Quartet by the Times music critic, and from this point in time were to be one of the foremost String Quartets in the United Kingdom until 1940.

They had a broad repertoire of chamber music compositions. In 1934 they listed all the string quartets of Haydn, Mozart, Schubert, Brahms, Dittersdorf, Beethoven, Schumann and Dvorak; quartets of Borodin, Dohnanyi, Grieg, Tchaiskowsky, Debussy, Franck, Ravel and Smetana; quartets by British composers, Bax, Goossens, Moeran, Ethel Smyth, Delius, Holbrooke, Imogen Holst, Vaughan Williams, and by French-American composer Marthe Servine; piano quintets of Schumann, Brahms, Franck, Dvorak and d’Erlanger; Quintet for Oboe and String Quartet by Bax, and works for larger combinations including the Septet of Beethoven, Nonet of Bax, and the Septet of Ravel.

They performed with some of the most well known musicians of the day, pianists Harriet Cohen, Malcolm Sargent, Myra Hess, and William Murdoch; Léon Goossens (oboe), Frederick Thurston (clarinet), and accompanied singers such as Dorothy Helmrich, Peggy Stack, Pouishnoff and Anne Thursfield.

The Kutcher String Quartet championed modern composers and their music . They gave first performances of works of English composers, introduced new works from abroad, tried out new formats of performances and in their penultimate year premiered the Piano Quartet by Aloys Fleischmann in Cork.

The Quartet was primarily based in London where they played in the Concert halls and private gatherings frequented by leading London society figures and patrons of the arts. They were prominent contributors to the Courtauld-Sargent Concerts, Robert Mayer Concerts for Children, Three Choirs Festival (Gloucester), and various subscription Concerts such as the Gerald Cooper Chamber Concerts in the 1920s.

Whilst they toured the Music Societies of Britain every year, they only ventured onto the continent on two known occasions: to the Netherlands in December 1930 and Poland April 1939. Their international fame grew through their BBC Radio broadcast, which began in November 1924 and continued until 1940.

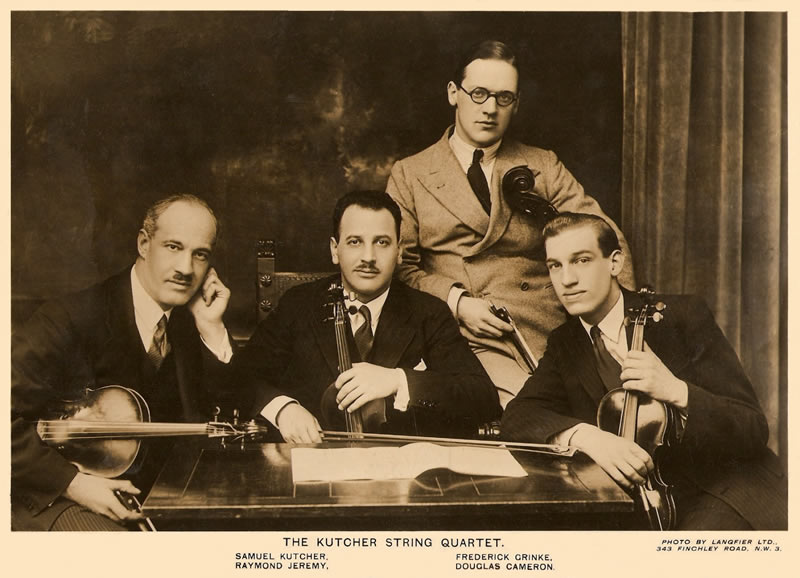
Samuel Kutcher, Frederick Grinke, Raymond Jeremy, Douglas Cameron

== Members of the Kutcher String Quartet ==
1st violin

Samuel Kutcher 1922 – 1940

2nd violin

Julius Rosenthal 1922

Kenneth Skeaping 1925

George Whitaker 1925-29

Pierre Tas 1929-31

Frederick Grinke 1931-37

Max Salpeter 1939-40

Viola

Frank Howard 1922

Leonard Rubinstein 1925

Cecil Bonvalot 1925

Henry "Harry" Berly 1925

James Lockyer 1925-29

Raymond Jeremy 1929-39

Leonard Ruben 1939-40

Cello

Ambrose Gauntlett 1922

John Barbirolli 1922 -1925

Edward J. Robinson 1925 ( for a recording)

Ambrose Gauntlett 1925-29

Douglas Cameron 1929-39

George Roth 1939-40

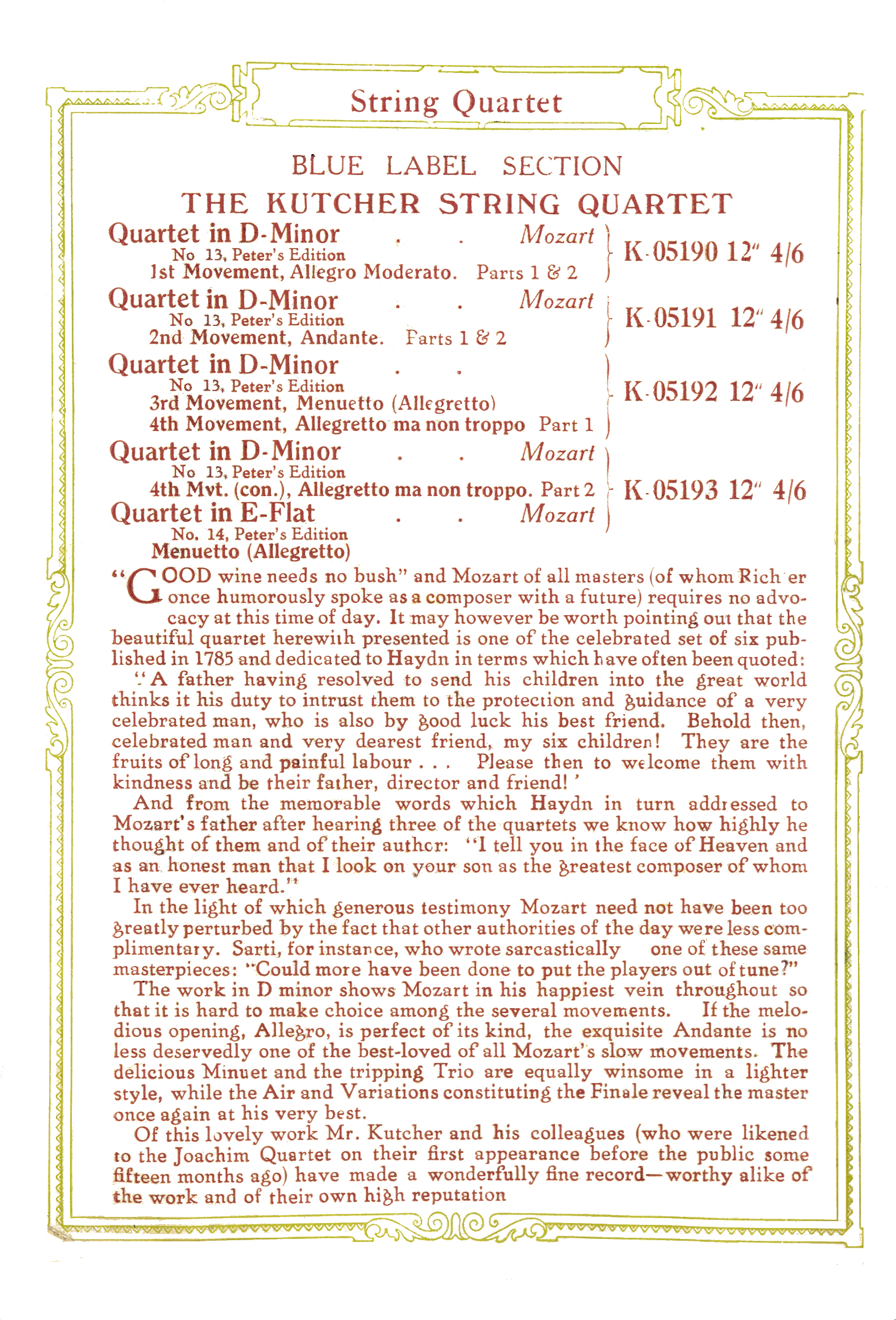
1925 October Vocalion Brochure

== Discography ==
1925: Kutcher Quartet: Mozart Quartet 13 (Vienna No. 6) in D, Köchel 173, Chwialkowski 16.16 (1773) .Filler: Mozart: Quartet 14 in Eb, Köchel 387: Menuetto (Allegretto).

Vocalion.K 05190/3 [7 sides]. Chwialkowski 16.17: 2, Menuetto (Allegretto in the first edition) (1782). Kutcher Quartet.

Eighth side of Mozart: Quartet 13 (Vienna No. 6) in D, K. 173. Vocalion.K 05190/3.

Performers: Samuel Kutcher (first violin), Kenneth Skeaping (second violin), Cecil Bonvalot (viola), Edward J. Robinson: (cello)

1925 recording by the Kutcher Quartet- String Quartet No. 16 in E flat K.428 - Menuetto by Mozart

(Filler for the 4th record above)

Performers: Kutcher Quartet; Samuel Kutcher (violin), Max Salpeter (violin), Raymond Jeremy, 1891-1969 (viola), John Barbirolli, 1899-1970 (cello)

Original issue no: Vocalion K 05193A1CD0209279 D1 BD2DUTTON LABORATORIES

1929. Kutcher String Quartet – Balfour Gardiner Quartet in B Flat – Electron X563 [2 sides]
