= John Herbert Long =

English music teacher and organist

John Herbert Long FRCO (1 July 1908 – 1985) was an English music teacher and organist.

== Life ==
The son of Herbert Long of Bury St. Edmunds, and Sophia Edith Chapman, Long was educated at Banbury Grammar School and the Royal College of Music, then studied Music at Merton College, Oxford from 1931 to 1934 (taking a B.Mus. in 1933, a B.A. in 1934), during which period he also served as the college organist. He later received an M.A. from Merton College, in 1946.

His sister was the celebrated pianist, Kathleen Long.

He married Margery Edith Barnby Tustain (1910–1993) in 1932; they had two sons.

Long served in the Intelligence Branch of the Royal Air Force during World War II.

In Beverley he was also Music Master at Beverley Grammar School from 1947. In 1949 he applied for the vacancy at Ely Cathedral but was unsuccessful.

== Appointments ==
- Organist at St. Mark's Church, Regent's Park, London 1928–1930
- Organist at Merton College, Oxford 1930–1934
- Organist at St Peter's Church, Brighton 1934–1938
- Organist at Beverley Minster 1938–1956
- Organist at St Aldate's Church, Oxford 1959–1963
- Music Master of Witney Grammar School 1963 onwards
