= Marthe Servine =

French-American, composer, pianist

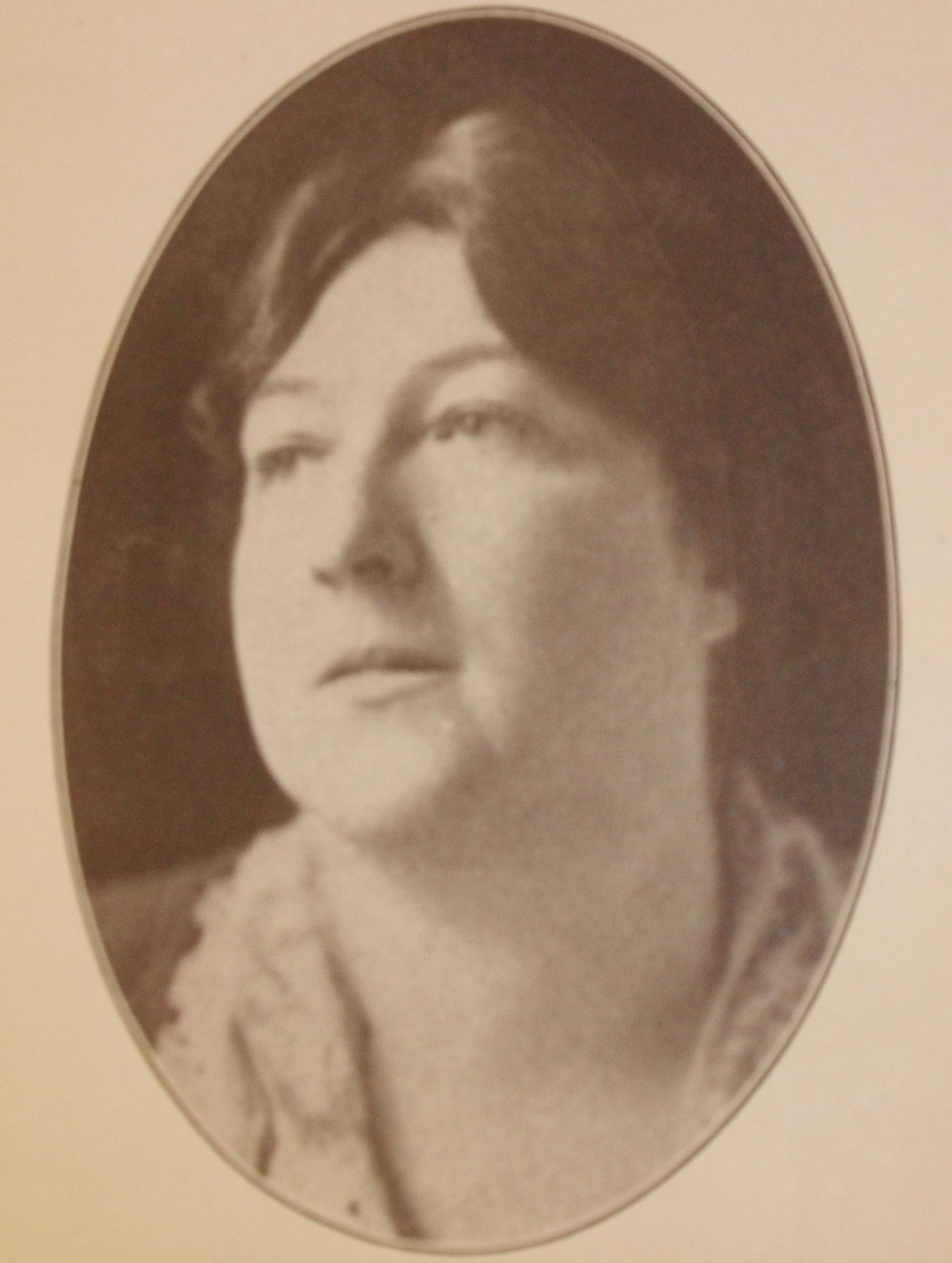
- Photo of French-American composer-pianist Marthe Servine, from an advertising flyer for her 1919 concert at Aeolian Hall, New York
- Born: 1862; Paris, France
- Died: 1972 (aged 109–110); Great Barrington, Massachusetts, United States
- Musical career
- Occupations: Composer, Pianist

Marthe Servine (1862 in Paris – 1960) was a French-American composer and pianist, primarily known for her works for solo piano and songs.

== Biography ==
Marthe Servine was born in Paris to French parents. She was brought to the U.S. at the age of 10 and became an American citizen. She returned to France to study music. She studied piano at the Paris Conservatoire and made her debut at the age of 12. At her debut she played the Mendelssohn G minor Concerto, under Xaver Scharwenka. She continued her piano studies with Vasily Safonov. She also studied composition with André Gedalge, the teacher of Honegger, Milhaud, and Ravel.

Sometime before or during 1919, Servine returned to the U.S. She gave a piano recital on March 8, 1919, at Aeolian Hall, in New York. At this concert, she performed exclusively her compositions, a trait shared by all of her known concerts, as is shown by her concert programs.

After 1919, but before 1924, Servine moved back to Europe, where the captions on her manuscripts show that she spent some time in France and some in Britain. She gave many concerts in Britain, all known ones consisting of her works, and all with herself at the piano. Her works were also played in concerts of which she was not a part, by the Brosa and Kutcher String Quartets, among others, and “many distinguished British singers have featured her songs.”

In 1939 or 1940, Servine returned to New York. She took up residence on the Upper West Side, and gave one concert, on February 9, 1941. The performers included the Roth Quartet and herself at the piano. The concert was well received, garnering several positive reviews from major New York newspapers. In the New York Sun review, she was described as a “vigorous person of middle years”. F. D. Perkins, writing in the New-York Tribune shortly after the concert, described her music as showing “solid and well-schooled musicianship and knowledge of form and generosity regarding melody”. Her style was “pervaded by the atmosphere of late nineteenth-century romanticism…[it occasionally called to mind] Brahms and Cesar Frank, or…MacDowell. The B flat quintet had one rising phrase in the strings which recalled Wagner”.

In the early 1940s, Servine married American Malcolm Dougherty, and around the year 1945 they moved together to Great Barrington, Massachusetts. Her song cycle “The Year” was captioned “Great Barrington, 1945”. She lived there until she died in 1972. Her last known work is a draft of a Prelude for two pianos, dated October 28-November 1, 1972. In 1973, her husband donated the collection to the New York Public Library for the Performing Arts.

== Works ==
Marthe Servine composed symphonies, concertos, operas, choral works (both with and without orchestra), chamber works for various combinations of instruments and solo instruments, and over 400 songs. She does not appear to have made any recordings. Her few published works are:

=== Songs ===
- Brahma
- The call
- A drinking song
- How sweet I roamed
- Identity

=== Solo piano works ===
- Prelude & fugue
- Sonata in D minor

=== Choral ===
- Rune of Hospitality

== Compositional style ==
Several of the reviewers remarked on the composer's surprisingly conservative style and rich sonorities. The Musical America reviewer, known only by the initial "C.," states that "The music heard on this occasion follows both traditional structural models and the traditional melodic feeling of the later Romantic school...the composer approached her group of instruments from the standpoint of orchestral coloring and the opulent sonorities achieved added a general lushness of effect to the melodic element".

Her works were viewed very positively by most, including J.B of the New York Post, who said "Madame Servine, judging by yesterday afternoon's offerings, just misses being a great composer". One reviewer, however, was critical, stating that, about her sonata for violin and piano (Sonata in B minor), "the length was excessive for the material, the emotion never quite realized in sound".

== Pianistic style ==
Servine was considered to be an accomplished pianist by the reviewers of her 1941 concert. The reviewer from Musical America known as C. said that she “proved to be a pianist of noteworthy virility of style, with an entirely adequate technique and the command of a rich warm tone”. Noel Straus of The New York Times said that she “played these works…with the same vitality and warmth, the same richness of tonal effects, reflected in her compositions….[She gave] the readings of the works that searchingly unfolded the full intentions of [the compositions].”

== Known concerts ==
All of the following concerts are documented by concert programs in the New York Public Library's Marthe Servine Manuscripts collection

- 1919, March 8 – at Aeolian Hall, New York. Piano recital, program consisted of works by Servine, who also was the sole performer. Works performed: two sonatas (F minor & D minor), Twelve Variations on a Hindu Theme. NYPL collection has a flyer, program, and notice/review.
- 1920-1939 – during her stay in London, “concerts of her works were given by the Brosa and Kutcher Quartets, and others”. Also, “Many distinguished British singers have featured her songs”.
- 1924, May 28 – at Steinway Hall, London. Song recital; program consisted of English-language texts set by Servine. Performers: Lilian Humphreys (singer), Marthe Servine (piano). Works performed: 23 songs. NYPL collection has a program.
- 1925, April 21 – at Wigmore Hall, London. Song recital; sung in English (some English and some translated poems), all by Servine. Performers: Lilian Humphreys (singer), Marthe Servine (piano). Works performed – 20 songs. NYPL collection has a program.
- 1926, February 18 – at the University College of North Wales, Bangor, Wales. Department of Music Chamber concert; all works by Servine. Performers: Lilian Humphreys (singer), Kathleen Washbourne (violin), Marthe Servine (piano). Works performed: 12 songs, Violin and Piano Sonata in B Minor. NYPL collection has a program.
- 1926, March 24 – at Wigmore Hall, London. Piano recital; all works by Servine, who was the sole performer. Works performed: Prelude and Fugue in D minor, Sonata in F minor, Twelve Variations on a Hindu Theme, Sonata in D minor. NYPL collection has a program.
- 1938, January 26 – at Wigmore Hall, London. Song recital; all works by Servine. Performers: Astra Desmond (contralto), John McKenna (singer), Frederick Riddle (viola), Marthe Servine (piano). Works performed: 12 individual songs, the song cycle The Lover's Sequence (a setting of Twenty-five Anonymous Spanish poems). NYPL collection has a flyer and program.
- 1938, April 25 – at Wigmore Hall, London. Chamber music concert; all works by Servine. Performers: Brosa String Quartet, Marthe Servine (piano). Works performed: Piano quintets in B flat minor and E flat major, Sonata for violin and piano in B minor. NYPL collection has a flyer with a program on the back.
- 1938, May 26 – at Wigmore Hall, London. Piano recital; all works by Servine. Works performed: Twenty Preludes, Sonata in D minor. NYPL collection has a flyer with a program on the back.
- 1941, February 9 – At Town Hall, New York, New York. Chamber music concert; all works by Servine. Performers: Roth String Quartet, Marthe Servine (piano). Works performed: Piano quintets in B flat major and E flat major (“Spring”), Sonata for Violin and Piano in B minor.

== Sources ==
- There is a photo of Servine in the Marthe Servine Manuscripts collection at the New York Public Library for the Performing Arts.
