= Verklärte Nacht =

Musical composition by Arnold Schoenberg

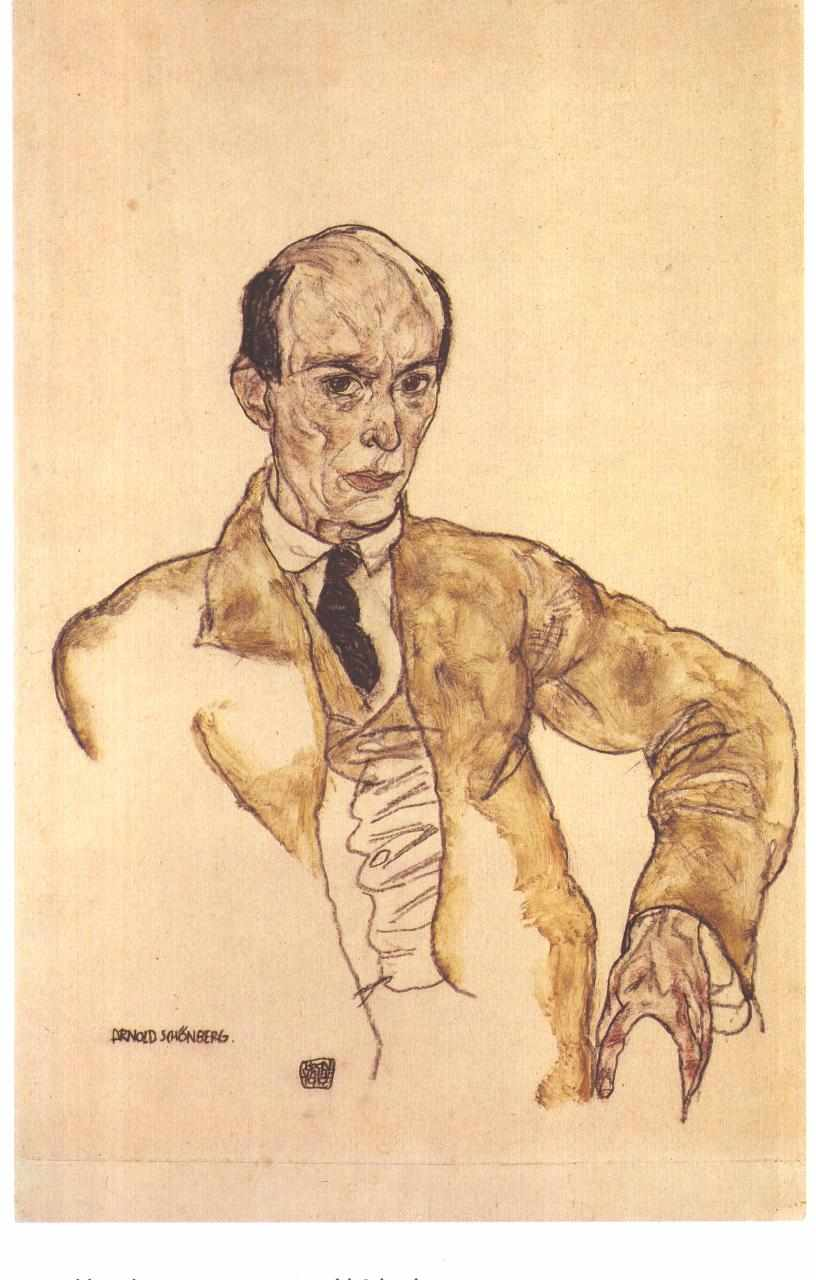
Arnold Schoenberg, by Egon Schiele, 1917

Verklärte Nacht (Transfigured Night), Op. 4, is a string sextet in one movement composed by Arnold Schoenberg in 1899. Composed in just three weeks, it is considered his earliest important work. It was inspired by Richard Dehmel's poem of the same name and by Schoenberg's strong feelings upon meeting his future wife Mathilde Zemlinsky, who was the sister of his teacher, Alexander von Zemlinsky (1871–1942). Schoenberg and Zemlinsky married in 1901. The movement can be divided into five distinct sections which refer to the five stanzas of Dehmel's poem; however, there are no unified criteria regarding movement separation.

== Premiere ==
The work was premiered on 18 March 1902 in the Vienna Musikverein by the Rosé Quartet with Arnold Rosé and Albert Bachrich (violins), Anton Ruzitska (viola), and Friedrich Buxbaum (cello), extended by Franz Jelinek (second Viola) and Franz Schmidt (second cello).

The British premiere of the sextet was on 23 of January 1914 at the Bechstein Hall in the presence of the composer. It was played by the London String Quartet: Albert Sammons, Thomas Petre, Harry Waldo Warner and Warwick Evans, who were joined by James Lockyer on viola and Cedric Sharpe on cello.

The composer's first version for string orchestra received its premiere on 29 November 1916 in Prague, under the direction of Alexander von Zemlinsky. It received its British premiere in Newcastle upon Tyne in December 1924, conducted by Schoenberg's champion and former student Edward Clark.

== Poem ==
Dehmel's poem (from 1896) describes a man and woman walking through a dark forest on a moonlit night. The woman shares a dark secret with her new lover: she bears the child of another man. The stages of Dehmel's poem are reflected throughout the composition, beginning with the sadness of the woman's confession, a neutral interlude wherein the man reflects upon the confession, and a finale reflecting the man's bright acceptance (and forgiveness) of the woman: "O sieh, wie klar das Weltall schimmert! Es ist ein Glanz um alles her" (See how brightly the universe gleams! There is a radiance on everything).

Zwei Menschen gehn durch kahlen, kalten Hain;
der Mond läuft mit, sie schaun hinein.
Der Mond läuft über hohe Eichen;
kein Wölkchen trübt das Himmelslicht,
in das die schwarzen Zacken reichen.
Die Stimme eines Weibes spricht:

"Ich trag ein Kind, und nit von Dir,
ich geh in Sünde neben Dir.
Ich hab mich schwer an mir vergangen.
Ich glaubte nicht mehr an ein Glück
und hatte doch ein schwer Verlangen
nach Lebensinhalt, nach Mutterglück
und Pflicht; da hab ich mich erfrecht,
da ließ ich schaudernd mein Geschlecht
von einem fremden Mann umfangen,
und hab mich noch dafür gesegnet.
Nun hat das Leben sich gerächt:
nun bin ich Dir, o Dir, begegnet."

Sie geht mit ungelenkem Schritt.
Sie schaut empor; der Mond läuft mit.
Ihr dunkler Blick ertrinkt in Licht.
Die Stimme eines Mannes spricht:

"Das Kind, das Du empfangen hast,
sei Deiner Seele keine Last,
o sieh, wie klar das Weltall schimmert!
Es ist ein Glanz um alles her;
Du treibst mit mir auf kaltem Meer,
doch eine eigne Wärme flimmert
von Dir in mich, von mir in Dich.
Die wird das fremde Kind verklären,
Du wirst es mir, von mir gebären;
Du hast den Glanz in mich gebracht,
Du hast mich selbst zum Kind gemacht."

Er faßt sie um die starken Hüften.
Ihr Atem küßt sich in den Lüften.
Zwei Menschen gehn durch hohe, helle Nacht.

Two people are walking through a bare, cold wood;
the Moon keeps pace with them and draws their gaze.
The Moon moves along above tall oak trees,
there is no wisp of cloud to obscure the radiance
to which the black, jagged tips reach up.
A woman's voice speaks:

"I am carrying a child, and not by you.
I am walking here with you in a state of sin.
I have offended grievously against myself.
I despaired of happiness,
and yet I still felt a grievous longing
for life's fullness, for a mother's joys
and duties; and so I sinned,
and so I yielded, shuddering, my sex
to the embrace of a stranger,
and even thought myself blessed.
Now life has taken its revenge,
and I have met you, met you."

She walks on, stumbling.
She looks up; the Moon keeps pace.
Her dark gaze drowns in light.
A man's voice speaks:

"Do not let the child you have conceived
be a burden on your soul.
Look, how brightly the universe shines!
Splendour falls on everything around,
you are voyaging with me on a cold sea,
but there is the glow of an inner warmth
from you in me, from me in you.
That warmth will transfigure the stranger's child,
and you bear it me, begot by me.
You have transfused me with splendour,
you have made a child of me."

He puts an arm about her strong hips.
Their breath embraces in the air.
Two people walk on through the high, bright night.

== Music ==
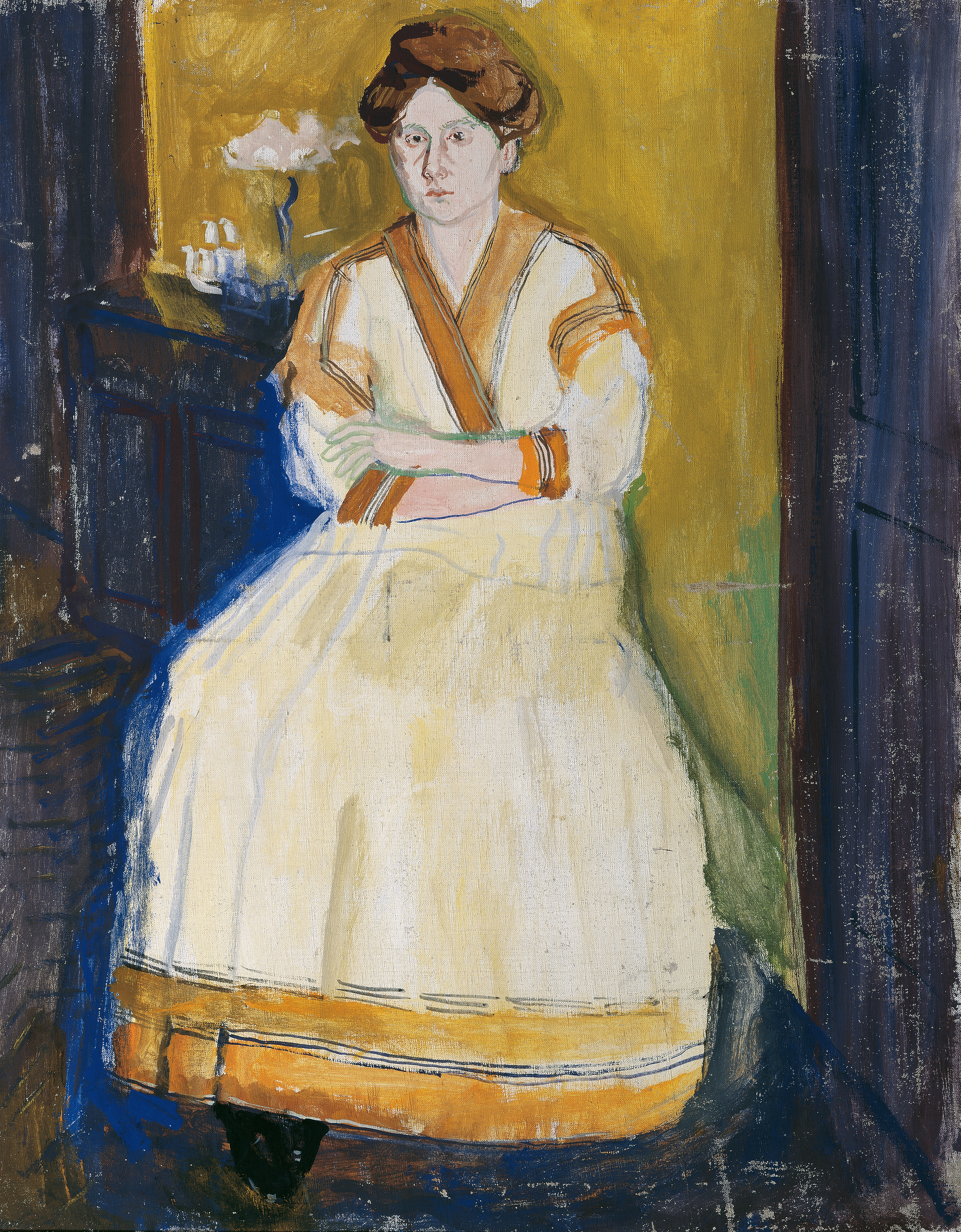
Mathilde Schönberg (1907), by Richard Gerstl

Schoenberg, the 20th-century revolutionary and later inventor of the twelve-tone technique, is perhaps best known among audiences for this early tonal work. The piece derives its stylistic lineage from German late-Romanticism, as does the poem. Like his teacher Zemlinsky, Schoenberg was influenced by both Johannes Brahms and Richard Wagner and sought to combine the former's structural logic with the latter's harmonic language, evidenced in the work's rich chromaticism (deriving from Wagner's Tristan und Isolde) and frequent use of musical phrases which serve to undermine the metrical boundaries. Richard Swift has examined the various tonal relations in the work.

The work, a tone poem, consists of five sections which correspond to the structure of the poem on which it is based, with themes in each section being direct musical metaphors for the narrative and discourse found in the poem. As such, the piece is one of the earliest examples of program music written for a chamber ensemble.

The original score calls for two violins, two violas and two cellos. In 1917, Schoenberg produced an arrangement for string orchestra (a common practice at the time), and revised this version in 1943. There is also a version for piano trio by Eduard Steuermann. The string orchestra version is the one most often recorded and performed. The work has also served as the basis for several ballets.

== Reception ==
Verklärte Nacht was controversial at its 1902 premiere. This was due to the highly advanced harmonic idiom, although Schoenberg did receive praise for his inventiveness. The work employs a richly chromatic language and often ventures far from the home key, though the work is clearly rooted in D minor. A particular point of controversy was the use of a single 'nonexistent' (that is, uncategorized and therefore unpermitted) inverted ninth chord, which resulted in its rejection by the Vienna Music Society. Schoenberg remarked "and thus (the work) cannot be performed since one cannot perform that which does not exist".

Some unfavorable reaction was also due to the use of Dehmel's poem as inspiration, questioning the viability of setting its themes to music, or being concerned about the situation of the woman in the story. The poem's content was considered improper for its failure to criticize (and possibly even its glorification of) premarital sex, and Schoenberg's lush harmonic treatment of the material further brought the work towards indecency in the minds of the Viennese.

Richard Dehmel himself was favorably impressed by Schoenberg's treatment of the poem, writing, "I had intended to follow the motives of my text in your composition, but soon forgot to do so, I was so enthralled by the music."
