= Virtuoso Quartet =

British string quartet

The Virtuoso String Quartet was a British quartet, founded by the Gramophone Company (better known as HMV) in 1924, being the first such quartet established specifically for recording. In effect they displaced the Catterall Quartet from their position recording for HMV.

Marjorie Hayward led them for the 15 years of their life. Raymond Jeremy and Cedric Sharpe previously performed in the Philharmonic Quartet.

== Personnel ==
- Marjorie Hayward, first violin
- Edwin Virgo, second violin
- Raymond Jeremy, viola
- Cedric Sharpe, cello

== Concerts ==
Date	Venue	Programme
October 1926	First Bradford Festival of Chamber Music	Brahms sextet Op. 36; Schoenberg Verklärte Nacht
December 1926	St Martin-in-the-Fields	Debussy Quartet G minor; Mozart Quartet in E flat (KV 428)
June 1927	Wigmore Hall	John B. McEwen: Three Quartets
October 1927	Second Bradford Festival	
September, October 1927	Aeolian Hall	
1927	Wigmore Hall	Bax: Quartet 2, Oboe quintet, Piano quintet
March 1928	Chelsea Music Club 36th concert	
June 1928	Aeolian Hall	John B. McEwen: Quartet in C Minor (First performance); Bax; York Bowen
October 1928	Oxford Town Hall	Ravel
November 1928	Oxford Town Hall	
March 1930	Wigmore Hall	Bax
1930	Celtic Congress, University College Concert Hall	Concert included work by John McCormack, the Welsh soprano Megan Foster, and the cellist, Beatrice Harrison

== Acoustic recordings (four sets; all premiere recordings) ==
- Beethoven: No 8, E minor (Op. 59/2): late 1924
- Tchaikovsky: Quartet 1 in D, Op. 11: 1923
- Franck: String Quartet in D: Premiere recording (1925)
- Bridge: Three Idylls: 1923.

== Electrical recordings (six sets and some singles) ==
- Ravel: quartet; Introduction and Allegro with John Cockerill, harpist
- Borodin: Nocturne
- Debussy: Quartet G minor
- Beethoven: No. 9 in C Op.59/3
- Beethoven: No. 6 in Bb Op.18/6.
- Glazounov: Orientale: 1928
- Thomas: Mignon Gavotte 1928; HMV B 2784

== Press notices ==
"From the London station [BBC] we have had many good things during the past month, the pick being the Virtuoso Quartet in Mozart and Debussy…"

"Good as these Budapest party records are [Haydn op76/1, HMV D1075-7], they are beaten all round by those of the Virtuoso Quartet in Debussy's G minor… For vividness and sonority this is surely among the finest achievements of the [Gramophone] Company".

"… distinguished themselves as virile performers of Beethoven… put up so excellent a show [in Ravel]"
