= Harry Waldo Warner =

English viola player and composer (1874–1945)

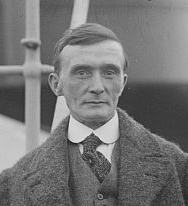
- Warner in the early 1920s
- Born: 4 January 1874; Northampton, Northamptonshire, England
- Died: 1 June 1945 (aged 71)
- Education: Guildhall School of Music
- Occupations: Violist; composer
- Years active: 1908–1940s
- Spouse: Rose Amy Pettigrew (m. 1896)
- Children: 1
- Musical career
- Genres: Classical; chamber; opera
- Formerly of: London String Quartet

Harry Waldo Warner (4 January 1874 – 1 June 1945) was an English violist and composer, one of the founding members of the London String Quartet and several times a Cobbett Competition winner for his chamber music.

== Early life ==
Born in Northampton (at 57 Grafton Street) Warner studied from the age of 14 at the Guildhall School of Music under Alfred Gibson for violin and Orlando Morgan for composition, later becoming a professor there. After giving some violin recitals, he began to concentrate on the viola.

== The London String Quartet ==
In 1908, Charles Warwick-Evans (1885–1974) was leader of the Queen's Hall cellos, and Warner was first viola in Thomas Beecham's New Symphony Orchestra. Warwick-Evans formed the idea of a string quartet worked up to the standard of a solo virtuoso, and approached Warner. He was enthusiastic, and then Thomas W. Petre (second violin) was found and finally Albert Sammons, the new Concertmaster of Beecham's orchestra, was asked to lead the quartet.

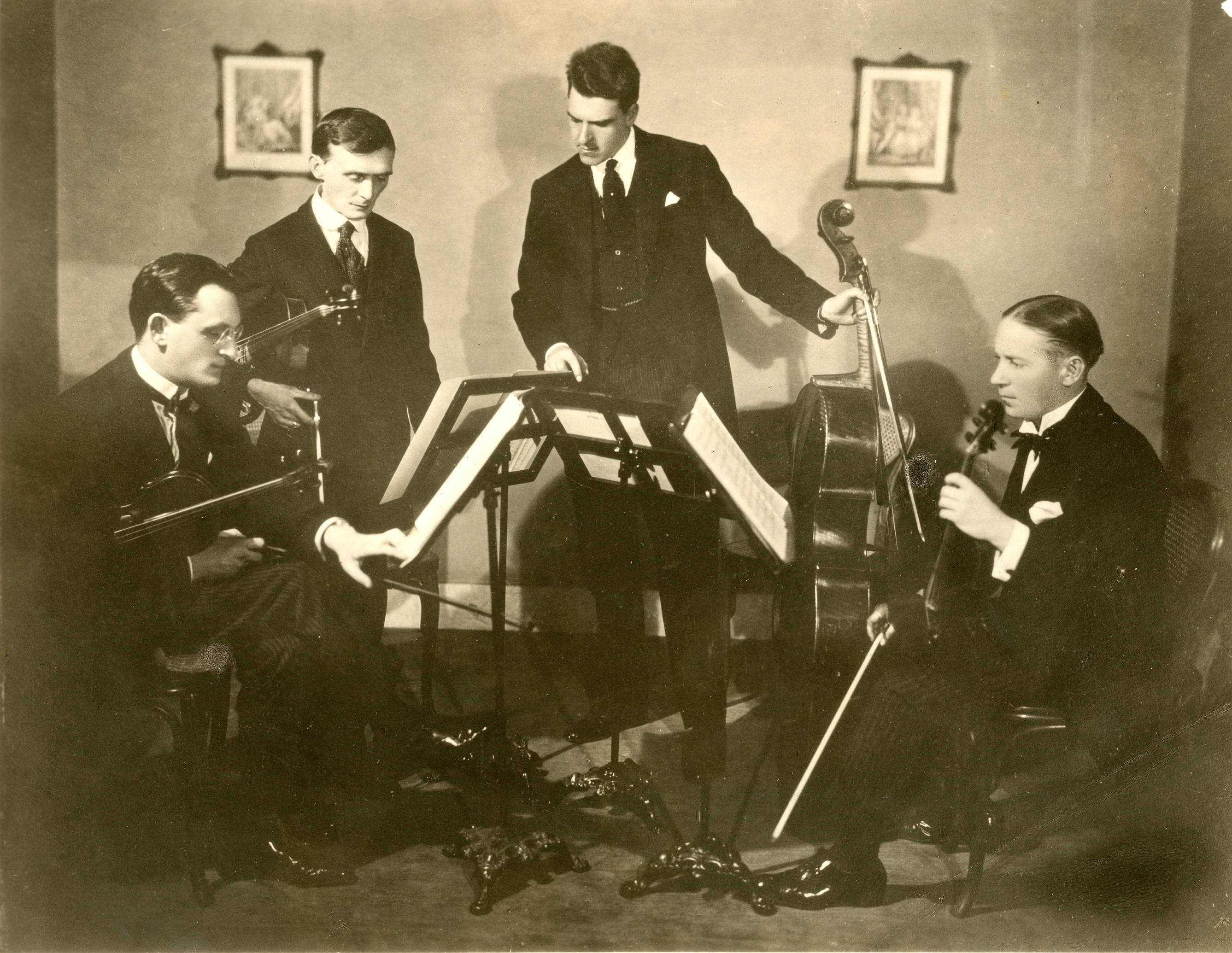
The London String Quartet in 1925; Warner is second from left

They rehearsed four times a week for nearly two years before giving their first concert on 26 January 1910, at Bechstein Hall, as the 'New' Quartet, playing Dohnányi in D-flat, Tchaikovsky in D, and the Fantasy Quartet No. 1 by Warner. Reviews were excellent. Their second concert was in June 1910, with Debussy in G minor, Beethoven Op. 59 no. 1, and a Fantasy of H. Balfour Gardiner. Warwick-Evans suggested the name London String Quartet, and in 1911, it was adopted.

The quartet gave concerts mainly in the UK but travelled to Amsterdam and Paris, with a repertoire extending from the classical period to contemporary works – including Verklärte Nacht in the presence of the composer. Warner also played in the first performance in England of Debussy's Sonata for flute, viola and harp (at an otherwise London String Quartet concert) on 2 February 1917 at the Aeolian Hall, which may have been its first public performance anywhere. Warner retired from the Quartet in 1929 for health reasons, and William Primrose took his place.

== Music ==
Warner composed his first opera while still a student, but established himself as a composer by writing a number of "phantasie" works – the single movement genre specifically defined for William Cobbett's chamber music competitions. The first was his String Quartet, Op. 12, which won fifth place in the first Cobbett competition of 1906. This was followed by his early piano trio in 1907. The Folk Song Fantasy Quartet, Op. 18, based on a folk melody from Berkshire, achieved some level of popularity after World War I, having won first prize in the 1917 Cobbett competition. According to Herbert Antcliffe, writing in 1920, the work "is probably heard more frequently than any other chamber work by a young British composer, and is popular in the fullest and best sense of the term".

A performance of the Folk Song Fantasy by the London String Quartet on 24 September 1920, along with Frank Bridge's String Quartet No. 1 in E minor, was attended by the American patron of arts Elizabeth Sprague Coolidge. It was probably her first hearing of Bridge's music, whose work she supported financially for the rest of his life. But she also became a champion of Warner, whose Trio for piano, violin and cello in A minor went on to win first prize at Mrs Coolidge's 1921 chamber music competition in Pittsfield, Massachusetts. The prize was a thousand dollars. The Trio, which was subsequently published by Ricordi, has been recorded by Trio Anima Mundi. The three movement piece "shows great vigour and metrical flexibility, both pungent and elegant, and with hints of both French models and of then-popular chinoiserie".

There are two other later published works for string quartet: The Pixy Ring (String Quartet No. 5), each movement being concerned with fairy lore; and the Suite in Olden Style, Op. 34 (String Quartet No. 6, 1929). The Divertimento in D, Op. 45, (1945) is another "olden style" suite of seven pieces for violin, viola and piano. Warner also adapted Stanford's Clarinet Concerto, Op. 129, for the viola.

Beyond chamber music, Warner also wrote orchestral suites, most notably the Three Elfin Dances (1905), performed twice at the BBC Proms in 1917 and 1924, subsequently broadcast on BBC Radio on several occasions, and The Broad Highway: Sketches from a Tramp's Diary. The tone poem Hampton Wick, Op. 38, based on a text he wrote himself under the pen-name "Onslow Frampton", was an unlikely prize winner at the 1932 Hollywood Bowl Competition. It was first performed by the Cincinnati Symphony Orchestra two years later. A Suite in D minor, Op. 58, with a viola soloist, has been orchestrated by Tim Seddon from a viola and piano manuscript that was in the collection of Lionel Tertis and passed on to his pupil Harry Danks. There are also two comic operas written early in his career – The Royal Vagrants: A Story of Conscientious Objection (1899) and Cupid's Market – as well as many songs for solo and chorus.

== Personal life ==
In 1896, Warner married the professional model Rose Amy Pettigrew (1872–1958), who from an early age had sat for artists including William Holman Hunt, Frederic Leighton, John Everett Millais, John Singer Sargent, Walter Sickert, Philip Wilson Steer and, especially, James McNeill Whistler. After their marriage, she retired from modelling. They lived in Chiswick.

They had one child, Onslow Boyden Waldo Warner (1902–1988), who also studied at Guildhall. Under the name Ken Warner, he became well-known as a dance band musician (playing saxophone and violin with Peter Yorke and Fred Hartley). From 1940 until 1959, he performed, arranged and composed light music and library music at the BBC. A CD of his music was issued by Extreme Music.

Harry Waldo Warner died in 1945, survived by his wife. Rose completed her memoirs two years later.
