= Bernard Shore =

English viola player and author

Bernard Shore (17 March 1896 – 2 April 1985) was an English viola player and author.

== Early life ==
Shore studied at the Royal College of Music from 1912, with Sir Walter Alcock (organ) and Thomas Dunhill (composition), but his time there was interrupted by the war. Returning after 1918 with an injured right hand – he had lost two fingers – Shore focused on viola playing rather than the organ, becoming a pupil of Arthur Bent, and subsequently Lionel Tertis. He also studied horn with Adolf Borsdorf.

== Career ==
From 1922 on he was an orchestral player, first with the Queen’s Hall Orchestra under Sir Henry Wood and (from 1930) as principal viola of the BBC Symphony Orchestra. There is an His Master's Voice recording of a performance of Elgar's Introduction and Allegro with the orchestra, conducted by Sir Adrian Boult with Shore as part of the solo quartet. It was recorded on 24 March 1937. He sometimes also played with the Spencer Dyke Quartet and the Catterall Ensemble.

As a soloist, Shore made his debut as a soloist in a recital with Angus Morrison in 1925. The following year came his first appearance at the Proms, giving the London premiere of Gordon Jacob's Viola Concerto No 1. He gave the second performance of William Walton's Viola Concerto in 1930 (following its premiere the previous year with Hindemith as soloist, in which Shore had played principal viola). On 27 August 1931 he played Flos Campi by Vaughan Williams at a Prom. Shore commissioned Christian Darnton's Viola Concerto, and gave its first performance on 15 April 1936. Other premieres of British music included Philip Sainton's Serenade Fantastique in 1936, Elizabeth Maconchy's Viola Concerto in 1937 and (with Albert Sammons) Stanley Wilson's Concerto for Violin and Viola, also in 1937. With Eda Kersey he premiered Arthur Benjamin's Romantic Fantasy for violin, viola and orchestra on 24 March 1938 at a Royal Philharmonic Society concert, with Benjamin conducting.

Shore retained great affection for Lionel Tertis, and on 18 March 1934 the two came together in a broadcast to play an adaption by Tertis of the Bach Brandenburg Concerto No 6 in Bb with two solo violas. By 1937 Tertis was finding he could no longer play to the standards he set himself, so he sold his beloved 1717 Montagnana viola to Shore. Shore eventually passed the viola on to his own pupil, Roger Chase.

In 1937 Shore wrote a book, The Orchestra Speaks, which arose out of his experience of orchestral playing. It discusses the inner workings of an orchestra and also includes a collection of character sketches of conductors of the time, including Sir Thomas Beecham, Adrian Boult, Malcolm Sargent, Henry Wood, Eugene Goossens and Hamilton Harty. In 1947 he wrote a second book, Sixteen Symphonies, discussing symphonies from Haydn to Walton. Shore was also an occasional composer of songs and instrumental pieces. His 1933 Scherzo for viola, published in 1933, has been recorded by Roger Chase.

In 1940 Shore left the BBC Symphony Orchestra to join the Royal Air Force. He reached the rank of Squadron Leader in 1942 and put on special duties, serving until 1945. Shortly after the end of the war he retired from the BBC Symphony Orchestra, took on a professorship at the Royal College of Music, and from 1948 acted as a staff inspector of schools. The Sons of Light, a cantata for chorus and orchestra (1950) by Vaughan Williams, was commissioned by the Schools Music Association where Shore was an inspector there. The work is dedicated to him. After Vaughan Williams' death in 1958 the previously unknown Romance for viola and piano was found amongst his papers. Shore gave the premiere of the piece on 19 January 1962.

== Later life ==
Shore was made a CBE in 1955. During the 1960s and 1970s he was involved in the Rural Music Schools Association and taught at the Northern School of Music and various summer schools. In August 1980, Shore was involved in the Lionel Tertis International Viola Competition and Workshop on the Isle of Man, which commissioned Gordon Jacob's Viola Concerto No 2 as a test piece. The winner of the competition, the 19 year old American Paul Neubauer, gave the first public performance in 1981 as part of his prize. Bernard Shore died, aged 89, at the Dulas Court care home in Hereford.

== Publications ==
- Shore, Bernard (1944). The Orchestra Speaks. London: Longmans, Green and Co.
- Shore, Bernard (1949). Sixteen Symphonies. London: Longmans, Green and Co.
