= Raymond Jeremy =

British violist (1890–1969)

- Birth name: William Raymond Thomas Jeremy
- Born: 22 November 1890; Laugharne, Carmarthenshire, Wales
- Died: 12 March 1969 (aged 78); Aberystwyth, Cardiganshire, Wales
- Genres: Classical
- Occupation(s): Musician, professor
- Instrument: Viola

Raymond Jeremy, FRAM, (1890-1969) was a British violist, known for his quartet playing, particularly the first performances of Edward Elgar's String Quartet and Piano Quintet. He was professor of violin and viola at the Royal Academy of Music in London and taught the violist Watson Forbes.

== Biography ==
Raymond Jeremy was born in Laugharne, Wales in 1890. His early instruction on the violin was in Wales with Oliver Williams. After three years of study with Williams, Jeremy was awarded the Ada Lewis scholarship to study at the Royal Academy of Music in London, where his violin professor was Hans Wessely. During his final year at the academy, he met Lionel Tertis and turned to the viola. Whilst at the Royal Academy of Music, Jeremy twice won the Charles Rube Prize for ensemble playing.

Jeremy played in Thomas Beecham's Symphony Orchestra in 1910 when Richard Strauss's new operas Elektra and Salome, received their first performances in Britain. He also played in Sir Henry Wood's Queen's Hall Orchestra.

Jeremy played with numerous ensembles over his playing career including the Kutcher String Quartet, the International Quartet, the Allied Quartet, the Philharmonic Quartet, the London Piano Quartet, the Virtuoso Quartet, the Meredyll Quartet, the Harp Ensemble, the Spencer Dyke Quartet, the British String Quartet, the Sybil Eaton Quartet, and the Henkel Piano Quartet. He also accompanied other String Quartets such as the London String Quartet and the Stratton Quartet.

With the Philharmonic quartet, Jeremy played in the premieres of two works by Arnold Bax, the In Memoriam sextet (1917) and the G major quartet (1918). During the first world war, Jeremy recalls playing quartets with cellist Arthur Williams (brother of Jeremy's first teacher), Jelly d'Aranyi and Adila Fachiri, and stated that he learned the most about musical performance by playing string quartets with this ensemble. It was his connection with the d'Aranyi sisters which gave him a way in to the high-society world of music.

Jeremy was a good friend of Sir Edward Elgar and gave the first public performances of Elgar's String Quartet and Piano Quintet at the Wigmore Hall on 20 May 1919, with Albert Sammons and W. H. Reed (violins), Felix Salmond (cello) and William Murdoch (piano). He also performed at Lady Elgar's funeral in April 1920, playing the Andante Piacevole from Elgar's string quartet. In that year Jeremy also played at the first private performance of Arthur Bliss's Conversations.

In December 1924 he performed at the Wigmore Hall in London with the celebrated Russian harpist Maria Korchinska in a performance of Debussy's Sonata for Flute, Viola and Harp. In 1927 Jeremy gave the premiere of Bax's Phantasy Sonata, with Korchinska, the work's dedicatee. Jeremy continued to play with Korchinska in recitals around Great Britain throughout the 1930s. Jeremy also performed with the Welsh harpist Gwendolen Mason.

In 1929 he performed Ralph Vaughan Williams's Flos Campi at the Geneva Festival of the International Society for Contemporary Music.

He made numerous recordings with a variety of ensembles including a recording in 1930 for the National Gramophonic Society of Paul Juon's Chamber Symphony Op. 27.

Jeremy taught in the 1920s at the Editha Knocker School of Violin Playing and was, throughout the 1930s, a professor at the Royal Academy of Music and an examiner for their Licentiate examinations. He received the Fellowship of the Royal Academy of Music (FRAM) in 1935.

During the second world war, Jeremy performed in a number of concerts for the wartime Council for the Encouragement of Music and the Arts (CEMA), the precursor to the Arts Council.

In his later years, he was professor of Violin and Viola at Aberystwyth College from where he retired in 1958.

The conductor and composer Eugene Goossens dedicated the second movement of his String Quartet (Op.14) to Jeremy. The other movements are dedicated to Arthur Beckwith and Cedric Sharpe, all members of the Philharmonic String Quartet who played alongside Goossens when he was the second violinist.

Jeremy married Märta Vivika Norstrom in 1926 (she died in 1947) and they had one daughter, Nancy.

Raymond Jeremy died in Aberystwyth in 1969, aged 78.
