= Cedric Sharpe =

British cellist, composer and music professor (1891 - 1978)

Cedric Sharpe ARCM, Hon RAM
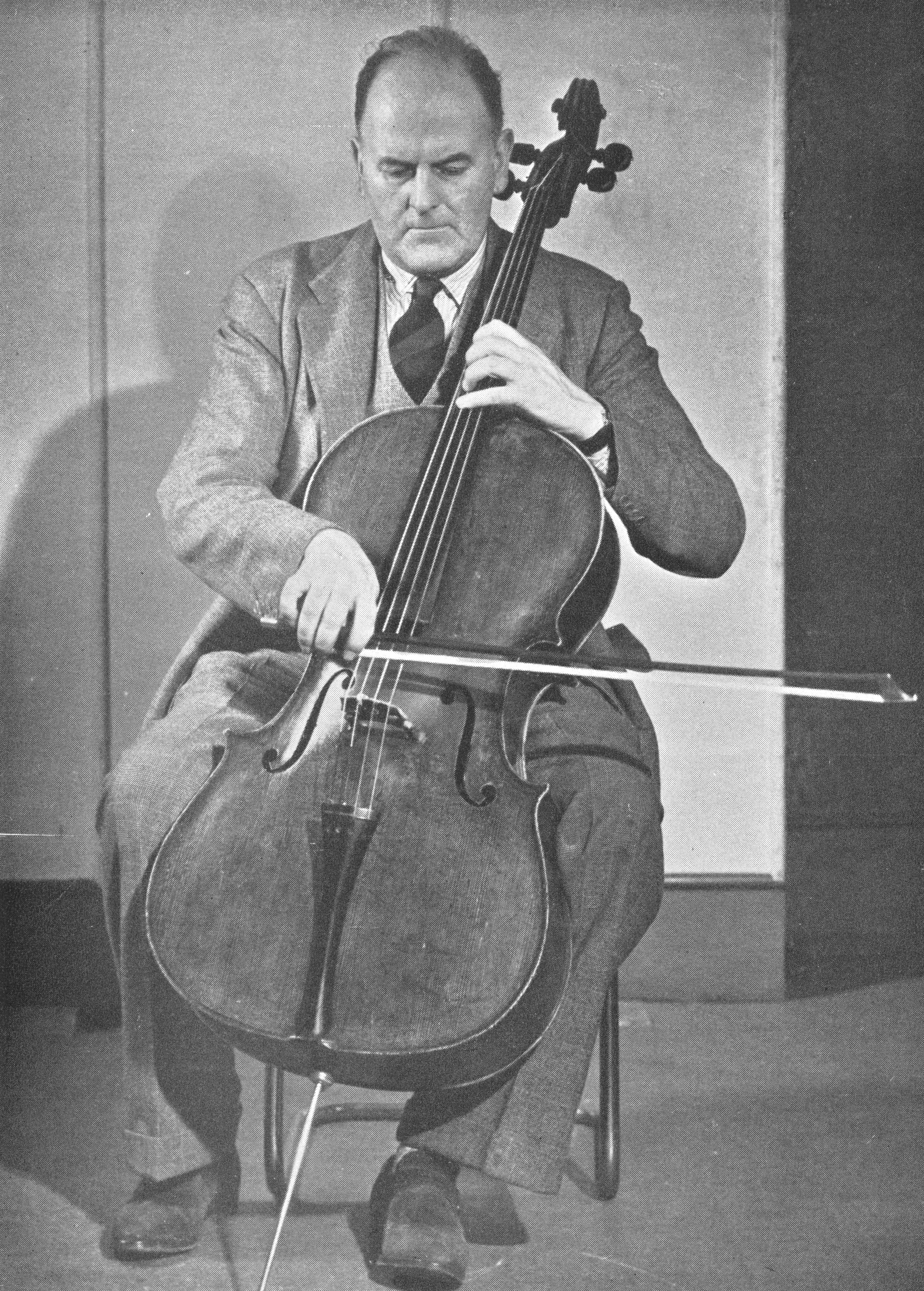
- c.1930s – picture taken from The Violoncello by Jules de Swert, edited by Cedric Sharpe

Background information
- Born: April 13, 1891; Maida Vale, London, England
- Died: July 1, 1978 (aged 87) Steyning, Sussex, England
- Genre: Classical
- Occupations: cellist, composer and music professor
- Instrument: Cello
- Years active: 1914-1966
- Label: His Master's Voice
- Formerly of: London String Quartet; Philharmonic Quartet; Virtuoso Quartet; London Symphony Orchestra

Cedric Sharpe, ARCM, Hon RAM (13 April 1891 – 7 July 1978) was a British cellist, composer and music professor of the early to mid-20th century. He studied cello at the Royal College of Music later becoming professor of cello at the Royal Academy of Music – the start of a teaching career that was to span almost four decades before he retired in 1966 at the age of 75. During the inter-War years he became a prominent player of both chamber and orchestral music; his repertoire included both British and European contemporary music. He recorded for His Master's Voice and was broadcast by the BBC. He composed a number of original pieces mostly for solo cello with piano accompaniment.

== Early life ==
Cedric Sharpe was born in Maida Vale, London, England, in 1891, the son of Herbert Sharpe a professor of piano and composer at the Royal College of Music in London. From the age of seven he studied under Tennyson Werge, a cellist who had performed with his father in London concerts. He continued his studies with the cellist W. H. Squire at the Royal College of Music gaining a scholarship there in 1907 at the age of 16. After completing his studies he left the Royal College of Music in 1912. In 1913 he married Evelyn Blanche Jennings a composer of songs and settings of poems; they had a son and a daughter.

== Playing career ==
Sharpe became a prominent player of both chamber and orchestral music. In 1914 along with James Lockyer (viola) and the London String Quartet he performed in the first British public performance of Schoenberg's Verklärte Nacht at the Bechstein Hall in London.

In 1915 he formed the Philharmonic Quartet with Arthur Beckwith (1st violin), Eugene Aynsley Goossens (2nd violin) and Raymond Jeremy (viola). The First World War interrupted their work as some of the members were called up for service; they re-formed in 1918 with Frederick Holding and Thomas Peatfield as 1st and 2nd violins. The quartet was active until the early 1940s.

In 1924 Sharpe founded the Virtuoso Quartet with Marjorie Hayward (1st violin), Edwin Virgo (2nd violin) and Raymond Jeremy (viola). They made frequent tours of the British Isles sometimes forming quintets with other well-known players of the day, for example Leon Goossens (oboe), William Murdoch (piano), Harriet Cohen (piano) or Arnold Bax. In 1926 with Dale Smith (baritone) and Sidonie Goossens (harp) they performed in a BBC concert of contemporary music which included "Ode to a Nightingale" by Eric Fogg and Aquarelles for string quartet by John Foulds; this was broadcast from the New Chenil Galleries studios in Chelsea over the radio station 2LO.

Sharpe was also a member of several other ensembles – the Chamber Music Players, the Chamber Music Trio, the English Trio, the Trio Players with Eda Kersey (violin) and Gerald Moore (piano), the Harp Ensemble and the Cedric Sharpe Sextet (formed in 1930) which was broadcast regularly by the BBC in the years leading up to the Second World War. The June 1932 issue of Gramophone magazine commented:

These are all interesting organisations, but one cannot help wishing that Cedric Sharpe, instead of making up the ensemble of so many different combinations, would devote himself exclusively to solo work; or, following the example of the Flonzaley and Lener Quartets, found a quartet whose members would devote themselves solely to their own organisation.

In 1933, the Trio Players along with Enid Cruickshank (contralto) performed three of Schoenberg's lieder: "Ewartung" and "Schenk Mir Deinen Goldenen" from Opus 2 and "Hochzeitslied" from Opus 3. These were broadcast over London Regional along with works solely for trio by Beethoven, Berlioz, Ireland and Schubert.

Sharpe also held the following positions as an orchestral player (with approximate dates where known): principal cello for the New Symphony Orchestra (1930s and 1940s), director and principal cello for the London Symphony Orchestra (1930s and 1940s), principal cello with the Royal Albert Hall orchestra and principal cello with the Royal Opera House Covent Garden orchestra (1940s). He played cellos by David Tecchler (dated 1701) and Charles Buthod (dated 1897).

== Academic career ==
In 1928 Sharpe became professor of cello at the Royal Academy of Music in London. His teaching career was to span nearly 40 years before his retirement in 1966 at the age of 75. He contributed to books about cello technique, for example editing and revising "The Violoncello" a primer originally written by Jules de Swert in 1920. The cellist Dennis Vigay (born 1926) was amongst Sharpe's pupils.

== Compositions ==
Sharpe's compositions date mainly from between the two World Wars. He wrote a number of original pieces for cello and piano, a number of arrangements for cello and piano, some original and arranged songs in ballad style and two pieces for light orchestra.

His original cello and piano pieces (with dates where known) are: Midsummer Song (1921), Gavotte in G minor (1927), The Angelus (1927), Chansonette (1928), An Old Time Dance (1928), Le Soir (1928), Five Little Solos for Cello and Piano (1928), Romance in A (1929), Valse Capricieuse (1933), An Old World Love Song (1933), Cradle Song (1939), Humoresque Rumbaesque (1939), Petite Valse Lyrique (1950), Nocturne (1951), Pavane, The Vesper Bell (from an old Breton folk tune) and Five Little Songs.

His cello and piano arrangements are of music by J. S. Bach and Thomas Arne. He also arranged the following traditional folk tunes: Six Old English Airs (1921), Six Old Irish Airs (1923), Eight Welsh Melodies (1925) and a set of Scottish folk tunes originally arranged for solo piano by his father Herbert Sharpe.

His ballad songs (with dates and lyricists where known) are: "The year's at the Spring" (Robert Browning 1927), "The Fairy Fiddler" (N. Hopper arranged 1927), "Lullaby Song" (Gabriel Setoun 1933), "Love thy Mother", "Little One. Prayer." (Thomas Hood 1933), "It was the Time of Roses" (1933) and "In Praise of Ale" (1934).

His light orchestral pieces are: Suite Pompadour (orchestrated by Hubert Bath 1934) and Holyrood Suite (1935).

== Recordings ==
Sharpe recorded for His Master's Voice starting in 1915 with a number of short pieces for solo cello, for example The Broken Melody by Van Biene (1915), Le Cygne by Camille Saint-Saëns (1916), Roses of Picardy by Haydn Wood (1918) and Salut d'Amour by Edward Elgar (1919). Throughout the 1920s and 1930s he recorded with his ensembles, for example the Virtuoso Quartet recorded Beethoven's quartets in E minor Op. 59 No. 2 (in 1924), C major Op. 59 No. 3 and E-flat major Op. 127. They also recorded the Debussy quartet in G minor Op. 10, the Cesar Franck quartet in D major M.9, the Tchaikovsky No.1 in D major Op. 11 (in 1924) and the Ravel in F major (in 1929).

== Death ==
He died in Steyning, Sussex, England, UK on July 1, 1978 at age 87.
