= Kutscher =

Kutscher is a German occupational surname literally meaning "coachman". Notable people with the surname include:

- Arthur Kutscher (1878–1960), German historian
- Hans Kutscher (1911–1993), German judge
- Marco Kutscher (born 1975), German equestrian
- Martín Kutscher (born 1984), Uruguayan swimmer
- Reinaldo Kutscher
- Volker Kutscher
- Yechezkel Kutscher (1909–1971), Israeli philologist
