= Herbert Sharpe =

British pianist, composer and music professor (1861 - 1925)

Herbert Francis Sharpe (1 March 1861 – 14 October 1925) was a British pianist, composer and music professor. He studied piano at the Royal College of Music in London later becoming professor there. He composed songs, chamber music and orchestral pieces. He was one of the founding professors of the Royal College of Music.

== Early life ==
Herbert Sharpe was born in Halifax, West Yorkshire, England in 1861 the son of a Yorkshire merchant. He gained a piano scholarship (The Halifax Scholarship) at the National Training School of Music (now the Royal College of Music) in 1876. He went on to succeed Eugen d'Albert as the Queen's Scholar there studying under Arthur Sullivan, Ebenezer Prout, J. F. Barnett and Frederick Bridge. After finishing his studies in 1882, he gave many concerts in the provinces as well as in London where he organised several series of trio concerts between 1899 and 1902. He married Bertha Turrell in April 1884 and his son the cellist Cedric Sharpe was born in 1891.

== Career ==
Sharpe was one of the founding members of the Royal College of Music being appointed professor of piano there in 1884 one year after it opened. In 1890 he became an examiner for the Associated Board. He was one of the first to bring the music of the modern French school into the curriculum. The composer Vaughan Williams was one of his most well-known pupils.

His successful career was to end in 1925 when he died suddenly while still in post aged 64. The pianist S. G. Shimmin who was one of his pupils wrote the following as part of the obituary article published in the RCM magazine in 1925:

Mr. Sharpe brought to his teaching certain qualities that endeared him to all his pupils. His patience was phenomenal. Imperturbably genial and kind, he would go over a difficult point again and again if necessary, without a trace of irritation. He had a quiet comprehensiveness of personality that made pupils trust his guidance entirely. His teaching was not of the narrow kind that sees but a segment of musical truth and proclaims it as the whole, thereby warping instead of widening the powers of judgment in the pupil. His musical vision was wide, and embraced many different manifestations of the art. He did not rely on any particular "method" in teaching, but used largely the way of example at the keyboard. It was a rare pleasure to bear him play passages from Debussy and Ravel, with a quality of tone almost uncanny in its beauty. But memory of all [sic], perhaps, was his Mozart playing which had unassuming serenity that approached perfection.

His influence for good in the life and work of the College has been a very potent one, and perhaps all the more so owing to the complete freedom from anything spectacular in his artistic nature. Always modest and self-effacing, inclining to no extremity of view, but always keeping a splendid balance and poise in his musical outlook, he has been instrumental in giving to the innumerable students who passed through his hands a broad and sane view of their work which is a very precious thing in these days of change and instability. While deeply mourning his loss, they will resolve to carry on in the light of his example.

Anna of the Five Towns, by Arnold Bennett is dedicated to him.

== Compositions ==
Sharpe's principal compositions are as follows:

Piano solos: Op. 1–10 – various, Songs of The Year twelve two-part songs Op. 16, Twelve two-part songs Songs of Moor and Mountain Op. 18, Twelve two-part songs Songs by the Sea Op. 19, Five pieces Op. 23, Five Character Pieces for piano duet Op. 24, Twelve trios Op. 25, Legende for Violin Op.26, Two Musical Sketches Op. 28, Four duets for 2 violins and piano Op. 29, Idylle for flute and piano Op. 38, Variations for two pianos Op. 46, Three four-part songs with orchestra (also for female voices with piano) Op. 52, Three Part Songs Op.54, Suite for Piano Op. 58, Three symphonic pieces for piano duet Op. 59, Pianoforte School Op. 60, Pantomime Suite Op. 61, Suite for flute and piano Op. 62, Six Two-part Songs Op.63, Suite for violin and piano Op. 65, Six English Fantasias Op. 71, Fantasie-Romance for Piano "We Two" Op.73, Preludes for Piano Op.74.

Arrangements of Grieg's Norwegian songs and dances for piano duet, Songs and duets – various, Concert overture for orchestra (still in manuscript), Romance for Two Pianos (still in manuscript), A comic opera in three acts (still in manuscript).

== Recordings ==
In 1922 Sharpe made a number of recordings for His Master's Voice accompanying his son Cedric Sharpe on the cello.
