= London String Quartet =

Classical music ensemble founded in London, 1908

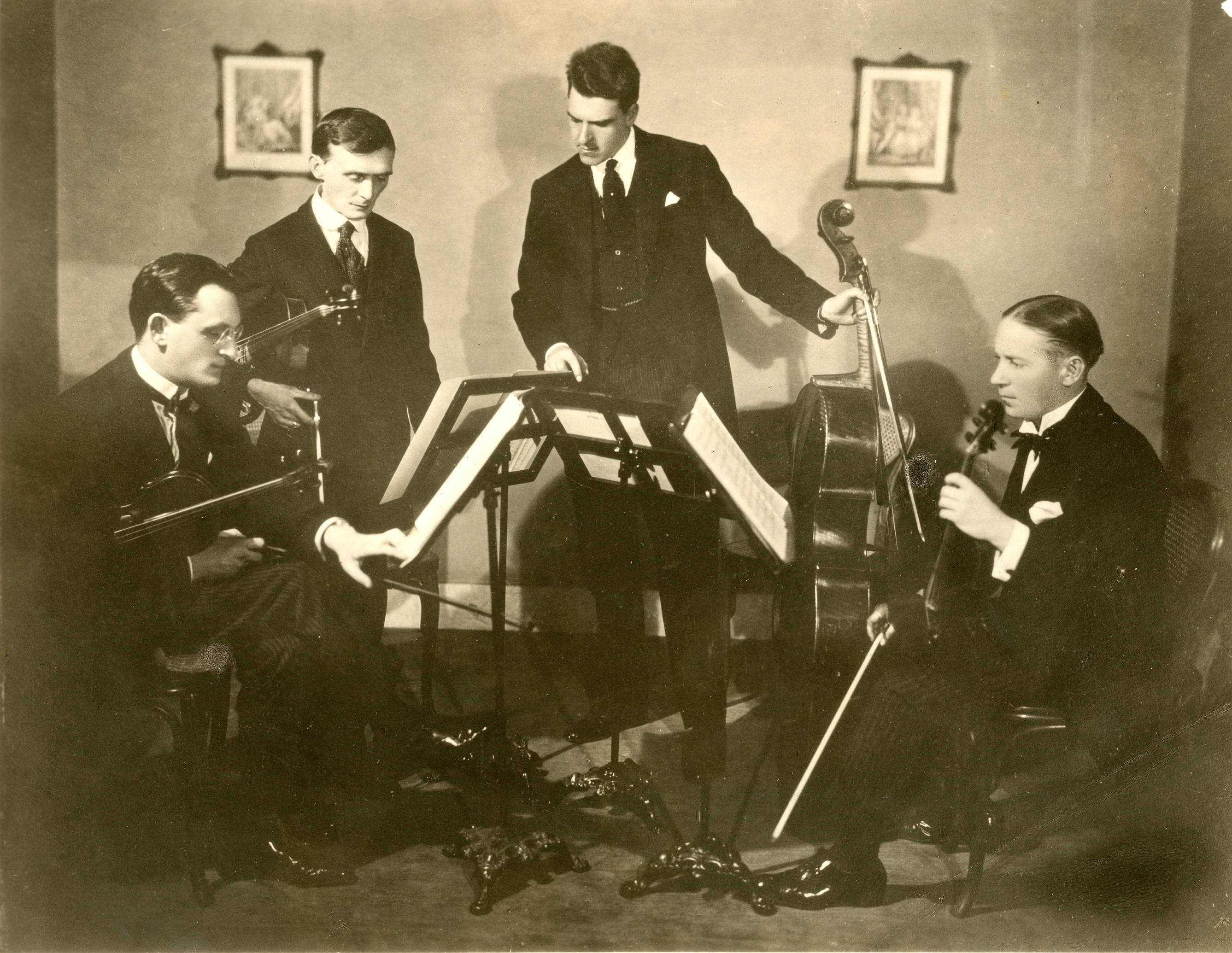
- The quartet in October 1925

Background information
- Years active: 1908–1930s

The London String Quartet was a string quartet founded in London in 1908 which remained one of the leading English chamber groups into the 1930s, and made several well-known recordings.

== Personnel ==
The personnel of the London String Quartet was:

1st Violin:

- Albert Sammons (1908–1917)
- James Levey (1917–1927)
- John Pennington (1927–1934)

2nd Violin:

- Thomas W. Petre (1908–1916, 1919–1934)
- H. Wynne Reeves (1916)
- Edwin Virgo (1917–1918)
- Herbert Kinsey (1918)

Viola:

- Harry Waldo Warner (1908–1929)
- Philip Sainton (1930)
- William Primrose (1930–1934)

Cello:

- Charles Warwick Evans (1908–1934; he later made his career in America)

== Origins ==
The viola player and composer Harry Waldo Warner (1874–1945) had trained at the London Guildhall School of Music under Alfred Gibson and Orlando Morgan. After giving some violin recitals he concentrated on viola. Charles Warwick Evans (1885–1974) had studied for 6 years at the Royal College of Music and became principal cello in the Beecham Opera Company, then leading cello in the Queen's Hall Orchestra. He resigned that post to devote himself to the String Quartet.

In 1908 Warwick-Evans was leader of the Queen's Hall violoncellos and Waldo Warner was first viola in the New Symphony Orchestra. Warwick-Evans formed the idea of a string quartet worked up to the standard of a solo virtuoso, and approached Waldo Warner. He was enthusiastic, and then Petre was found and finally Albert Sammons, the new leader of Thomas Beecham's orchestra, to lead the quartet.

They rehearsed four times a week for nearly two years before giving their first concert. There was to be no 'boss': if anyone disagreed with tempo or phrasing he spoke out, the point was discussed, and the decision made if necessary by voting. The first concert was on 26 January 1910, at Bechstein (Wigmore) Hall, as the 'New' Quartet, playing Dohnanyi in D flat, Tchaikovsky in D, and a Fantasy Quartet (No. i) of Waldo Warner's. Reviews were excellent: the second concert was in June 1910, of Debussy in G minor, Beethoven Op. 59 no. 1, and a Fantasy of Balfour Gardiner's. Warwick-Evans suggested the name 'London String Quartet' and in 1911 it was adopted.

== Wartime and after ==
The British premiere of Arnold Schoenberg's Verklärte Nacht took place on 23 January 1914 at the Bechstein Hall in the presence of the composer. The London String Quartet was supplemented by James Lockyer on viola and Cedric Sharpe on cello.

At the outbreak of war later in 1914, Petre was called up to serve in France and his place was taken successively by Wynn Reeves, Herbert Kinsey, and Edwin Virgo. Warwick-Evans and Waldo Warner could not serve for health reasons. Albert Sammons, meanwhile, was building a solo career and had less time for essential rehearsals. In May 1915 the quartet began to give chamber music 'Pops', much liked in wartime London. By May 1917 they had given 50 concerts. At about that time Sammons left and was replaced (July 1917) by James Levey, a pupil of Ferdinand Hill's. The last of these concerts, the 117th, was on 14 July 1919.

In 1920 the suggestion was made that they should perform a one-week cycle of the complete Beethoven quartets, and this was done first in Edinburgh, then in London, then Stockholm, Christiania, and variously in America, in all ten cycles including three in London. In September 1920 they were introduced to America by Mrs Elizabeth Sprague Coolidge at Pittsburgh, playing Frank Bridge's E minor (Bologna) Quartet, Beethoven in E minor, and Waldo Warner's Folk-song Fantasy.

== International touring ==
In addition to a great number of concerts in London and England they undertook many international tours, notably to America, France, Portugal, Spain (twice), Scandinavia (thrice), (Germany) and Canada. From November 1922 to April 1924 they conducted a world-tour.

Their prestige in America, North and South, was very considerable, and they travelled from Canada to Buenos Aires, performing much new music as well as Beethoven quartet cycles. By the late 1920s they had introduced around one hundred new pieces of music to the repertory. Their disbanding, in November 1934, was prompted by John Pennington having been appointed to the concertmaster's chair in San Francisco. Thereafter all but violist Primrose – who joined Toscanini's NBC Symphony Orchestra as co-principal – moved to Hollywood studios. In 1941 the quartet reformed for concerts in Los Angeles and performed at summer concerts and other recitals. Primrose pursued his distinguished career as a soloist and was replaced by Cecil Bonvalot, and subsequently Edgardo Acosta. The quartet formally disbanded in 1952.

The quartet was considered one of the most important international groups of its time. Numerous premieres, Beethoven cycles, widespread concertising, and eminent recordings marked out its trajectory. The 'live' Library of Congress recordings demonstrate what is considered its best musicianship in ways that even its studio discs occasionally fail to show.

Irving Kolodin wrote:

'In the Flonzaley's later years,... they seemed to have become a committee of experts matching exquisite swatches of tonal texture rather than performers of music. For young ears, the rise of the London String Quartet (with the incomparable James Levey as leader, and the enduring partnership of Thomas Petre, H. Waldo Warner and C. Warwick Evans participating) dimmed the Flonzaley star even as it was waning. A more vibrant enthusiasm, a stronger sense of tonal colours, a refinement that was not raffiné, gave them pre-eminence as long as this personnel endured. This, in truth, was not long, and though Levey's successor was John Pennington of the honeyed tone, and William Primrose first showed his prowess as a violist in Waldo Warner's place, it was not the same thing.'

As live Library of Congress recordings irrefutably demonstrate, Kolodin's implication that the Levey-led quartet declined when Pennington and Primrose took their places in the ensemble is very much wide of the mark.

== Waldo Warner ==
Harry Waldo Warner also won distinction as a composer of chamber music, including six published string quartets and a trio. Many of his quartets were premiered by the London String Quartet. The first two quartets were one-movement works described as Phantasies for the purposes of the Cobbett Prize, which was won by both. The third in C minor is in four movements, though the slow movement and scherzo are linked: the fourth is a Phantasy based on an English folk-song, with many variations. The fifth is a Suite called 'The Pixy Ring', each movement being concerned with fairy lore, and the sixth is a Suite of four movements described as being in the 'Olden Style'.

== Recordings ==
The group made prolific early recordings in the days of the pre-electric recording horn, when it was difficult to obtain clear sound from string chamber groups. The 1917 premiere recording (made in this way) of the Vaughan Williams song-cycle On Wenlock Edge, with Gervase Elwes (tenor) and Frederick B. Kiddle (piano) is deservedly famous, and has James Levey as first violin (Columbia Records, Purple label, 7363–7365). This remained in the catalogue until at least 1933.

Acoustic recordings also include the following works:

- Beethoven: Quartets Nos. 1 (Columbia 1919): 2 (Columbia 1916): 3 (Vocalion 1921): 6 (Vocalion 1924): 8 (Columbia 1924 and 1925): 14 (Vocalion 1924).
- Brahms: Quartet No. 2 (Vocalion 1923).
- Elgar: String Quartet in E minor (Vocalion 1921).
- Haydn: Quartet in B♭, Op. 64, No. 3 (Vocalion 1921): Quartet in D, Op. 64, No. 5 (Lark) (Columbia 1919): Quartet in C, Op. 76, No. 3 (Emperor) (Columbia 1924):
- Kreisler: Quartet (Vocalion 1921).
- Mendelssohn: Quartet No. 1 (Vocalion 1922).
- Mozart: Quartets Nos. 14 (Columbia 1916): 15 (Columbia 1918): 21 (Vocalion 1920): Quintet 4 (Columbia 1917).
- Schubert: Quartet No. 13 (Columbia 1921 unissued): Trout Quintet (Columbia 1924) (coupled with a Glazounov movement): Quartet in D minor 'Tod und das Mädchen'. (Col Light Blue, 78 rpm, L1751-1754). (20 November & 24 December 1925).
- Schumann: Quartet No. 1 (Columbia 1917): Piano Quintet (Vocalion 1921).
- Smetana: Quartet No. 1 (Vocalion 1923).
- Warner: Quartet in C (Vocalion 1923).

In 1928 the Columbia Graphophone Company sponsored and organised a Schubert Centenary event, which included a Composer's Contest and two other phases of awards, and was completed with an issue of over seventy records of Schubert's music, including chamber recordings by various groups. The London String Quartet was invited to record the following Schubert items (these electrical-microphone recordings feature John Pennington at the first violin desk):

- Schubert: Quartett-satz in C minor (Col Light Blue, 78 rpm, L1679R). (4 November 1927) [This was an electrical recording made to replace L1679 recorded 18 December 1924].
- Schubert: Quintet in A major 'The Trout', with Ethel Hobday (piano) and Robert Cherwin (double-bass). (Col Light Blue, 78 rpm, L 2098–2102). (9–10 January 1928).
- Schubert: Quintet in C major op 163 with Horace Britt (cello). (Col Dark Blue, 78 rpm, 9485–9490). (18–19 April 1928).

These items were also available:

- Franck: Quartet in D major (Columbia Light Blue, 78 rpm, L2304-2309). (26–27 October 1928).
- Beethoven: Quartet in A minor op 132 (Columbia 78 rpm LX 332–336). (2–3 April 1934).

=== Re-issues, restorations ===
- The London String Quartet: 1917-1951 Recordings, Music & Arts CD-1253 (eight CDs), 2012
- London String Quartet: Columbia Electrics Volume 1, Schubert, Frank Bridge, Pristine Audio PACM127 (two CDs), 2025
- Schubert: Quintet for Strings, Pristine Audio XR PACM071 (2011)
- Columbia Masterworks: Beethoven & Schubert, St Laurent Studio YSL 78-022 (2011)
- LSQ: Frank Quartet in D Major, St Laurent Studio YSL 78-033 (2011)

== Sources and notes ==
- A. Eaglefield-Hull, A Dictionary of Modern Music and Musicians (Dent, London 1924).
- R. Elkin, Queen's Hall 1893–1941 (Rider, London 1944).
