= Philharmonic Quartet =

The Philharmonic Quartet was an English string quartet musical ensemble founded during the period of the First World War and remaining active until the early 1940s, by which time none of the original members were present in the group.

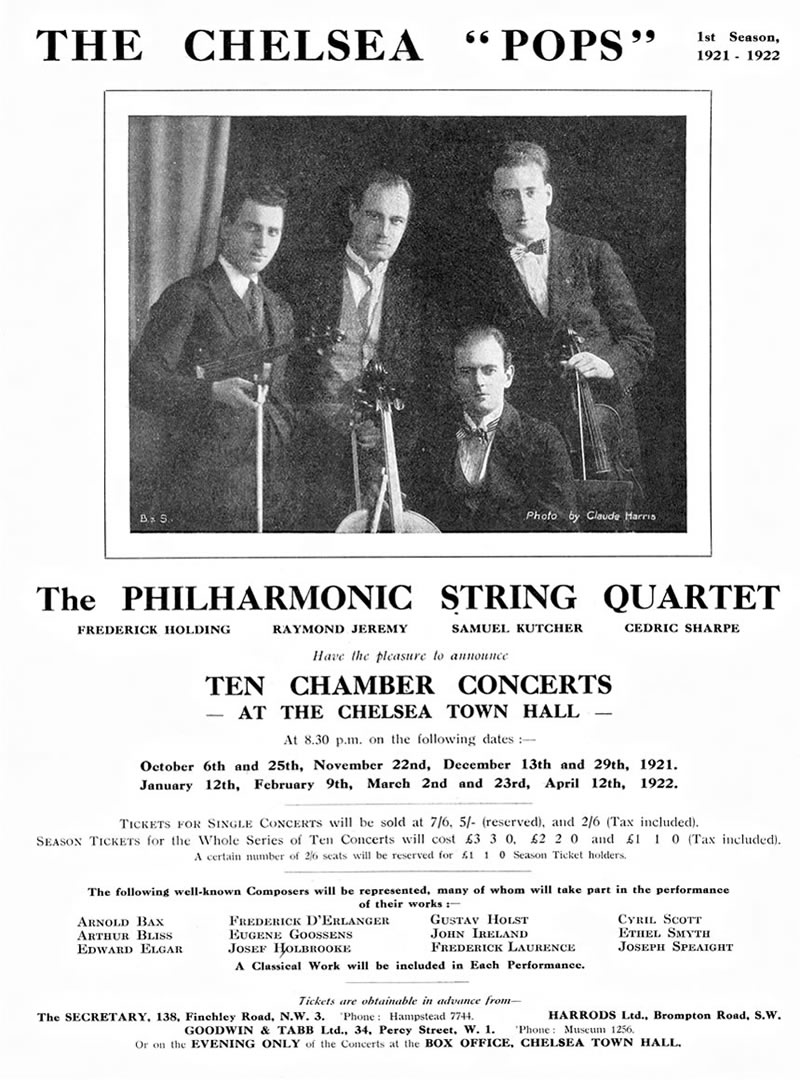
Concert brochure from 1921

== Original members ==
1st violin: Arthur Beckwith
2nd violin: Eugene Aynsley Goossens
Viola: Raymond Jeremy
Violoncello: Cedric Sharpe

== Early history ==
The quartet championed works by British composers, giving the first performances of works by Arnold Bax, Cyril Rootham and Arthur Bliss. They also performed several works by Eugene Aynsley Goossens, including his String Quartet op.14, which dedicated each of its movements to a member of the group. In addition to performances of standard repertoire by Beethoven and Mozart, the quartet played contemporary works by Ravel, Stravinsky and Debussy.

Some of the players were conscripted into active service during the First World War. When the quartet reappeared in 1918, Goossens had been replaced by 'F. Holding'. The following year, Arthur Beckwith was replaced by 'Mr Peatfield'. Cedric Sharpe was later to found the Virtuoso Quartet in 1924 and was joined by Raymond Jeremy.

== Recordings ==
The Philharmonic Quartet made several recordings for the Gramophone Company on the His Master's Voice label:

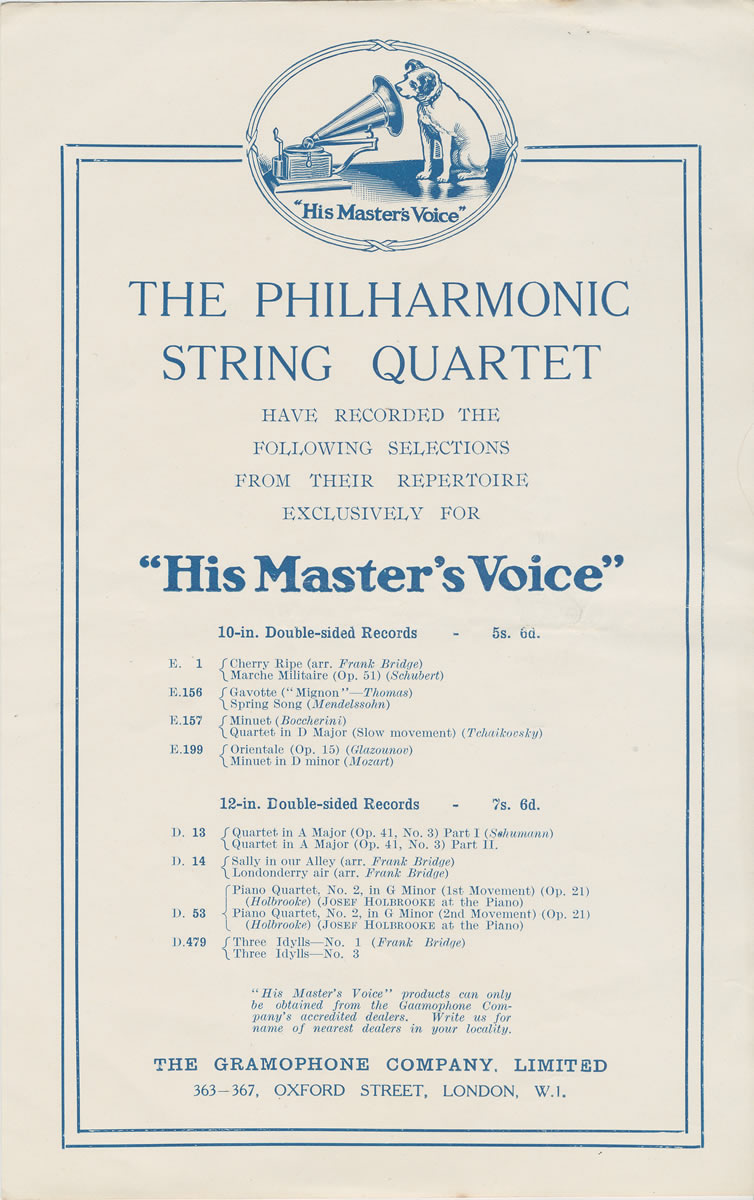
His Master's Voice Catalogue with Philharmonic String Quartet recordings

- Glazunov 5 Novelettes Op.15 – (iv) Valse
- Coates: Bouree
- Boccherini: Minuet, G275 (Recorded 12 July 1915)
- Bridge: Cherry ripe
- Bridge: Sally in our alley (Recorded 25 March 1918)
- Bridge: Irish melody (Recorded 25 March 1918)
- Bridge: Idylls, string quartet (Recorded 9 January 1920)
- Glazunov: Oriental, op.15, no.2 (1 June 1920)
- Holbrooke: Piano Quartet No. 2 in G minor Op. 21
- Holbrooke: Folksong suite no.1 (Recorded 25 March 1918)
- Mendelssohn: String quartet no.1 (Recorded 27 March 1916)
- Mendelssohn: Spring song (Recorded 27 March 1916)
- Mozart: Minuet in D minor (Recorded 9 January 1920)
- Ravel: String quartet, F major (Recorded 25 March 1918)
- Schubert: String quartet no.14, D810, D minor. Andante con moto (Recorded 12 July 1915)
- Schubert arr. Scott: Marche Militaire
- Schumann: String quartet, op.41. no.3 (Recorded 14 February 1918)
- Tchaikovsky: String quartet no.1 Andante cantabile (Recorded 12 July 1915)
- Thomas: Mignon. Gavotte (Recorded 27 March 1916)
