= Albert Sammons =

English violinist and composer (1886–1957)

Sammons in middle age

Albert Edward Sammons (23 February 1886 – 24 August 1957) was an English violinist, composer and later violin teacher. Almost self-taught on the violin, he had a wide repertoire as both chamber musician and soloist, although his reputation rests mainly on his association with British composers, especially Elgar. Sammons made a number of recordings over 40 years, many of which have been re-issued on CD.

== Early life and education ==
Albert Sammons was born in Fulham, the second eldest of four children. His father was a shoemaker and good amateur violinist. Sammons started to receive some lessons from his father around the age of seven. Apart from these lessons, he was virtually self-taught. His first professional engagement was in the band at the Earls Court Exhibition in 1898; the conductor was so impressed by the 12-year-old that he made him leader. He left school at this time and became a professional musician – partly to bring extra income to the household, as his father was a compulsive gambler.

Sammons's father took both Albert and his eldest brother Tom to symphony concerts at St James's Hall and Queen's Hall. The boy began to gain a reputation for his reliability and was engaged by many London musical establishments, as well as in the 'Hungarian' and 'White Viennese' bands popular at the time. Sammons also received a few free lessons from the Eugène Ysaÿe-trained Spanish violinist Alfredo Fernandez. At 16, relations with his father reached a point where Albert and his brother left home to stay with friends, only returning when his father walked out to join the band on an ocean liner and the two brothers were therefore obliged to provide for the rest of the family.

== Concert career ==
His first concerto performance was the Mendelssohn E minor Concerto at the Kursaal Concert Hall in Harrogate in 1906. Among the concertos in his repertoire were those by Beethoven, Brahms, Bruch, and the Mozart G major. He married Laura Tomkins in Middlesbrough on 31 October 1907 (divorced 1920). Around this time Sammons was recruited to play at musical parties for the upper classes at their country houses.

He was the leader of the British Symphony Orchestra in a series of Amalgamated Musicians' Union Sunday concerts at the London Coliseum in 1908–1909. Conductors of the concerts included Jimmy Glover and Alick Maclean. He was also engaged by Ernesto Bucalossi at the Waldorf Hotel and Wyndham's Theatre. It was at the Waldorf that Thomas Beecham heard him and in August 1909 offered him the position of sub-leader (soon to be leader) of his orchestra, which later included opera seasons at Covent Garden, and the 1911 Diaghilev season. He also consolidated his solo career by playing the Bruch Violin Concerto No. 1 with the London Symphony Orchestra at the Queen's Hall in 1910. The conductor Adrian Boult commented on his rise in British violin-playing, "he had had no special preparations, no training abroad, no scholarship luxuries".

In 1910, with Thomas Petre (second violin), Warwick Evans (cello), and Harry Waldo Warner (viola) he formed the London String Quartet, with whom he remained until 1917. The quartet gave concerts mainly in the UK but travelled to Amsterdam and Paris, with a repertoire extending from the classical period to contemporary works – including Verklärte Nacht in the presence of the composer.

He mainly appeared in the UK, although he did lead the Beecham orchestra for a six-week season with the Diaghilev company at the Kroll Opera House, Berlin in 1913 and, having played under Pierre Monteux for the Diaghilev seasons, was invited to lead the orchestra at the Casino de Dieppe, giving two concerts a day, and extending both his orchestral and chamber music repertoire.

After the end of the First World War, Sammons all but gave up string quartet and orchestral playing to concentrate on a large, regular programme of solo work and chamber music recitals throughout Britain and Ireland, and later, broadcasts. Sammons, William Murdoch (piano), Lionel Tertis (viola) and Lauri Kennedy (cello), founded The Chamber Music Players in 1921, giving their first private performance on 6 January of that year, and first public concert at Haverstock Hill, London on 13 January, going on to give many concerts at the Wigmore Hall and around the UK.

== Elgar, Delius and Debussy ==
Sammons was particularly associated with Edward Elgar's Violin Concerto in B minor, which he first played on 23 November 1914. He made the first complete recording of the concerto on 18 March and 10 April 1929 with the New Queen's Hall Orchestra conducted by Sir Henry Wood, which displays "wonderfully assured portamenti carried as if on the breath of a great singer" and "immense structural strength". He estimated that he played the concerto over a hundred times, including at The Proms. He gave his last performance of the Elgar on his 60th birthday in 1946, with George Weldon conducting the BBC Symphony Orchestra. He also made the first recording of Elgar's Violin Sonata in E minor in 1935.

In May 1915 a chance encounter in London with Frederick Delius led directly to the composition of a violin concerto in which Sammons probably assisted considerably even to the point of writing some link passages. On 13 July 1916 Sammons gave the first UK performance of the Violin Sonata of Claude Debussy, only six weeks after its Paris premiere.

He played a part in the rehabilitation of Fritz Kreisler, by presenting (along with Dame Nellie Melba) a laurel wreath at the Austrian violinist's first appearance in England after the war in 1920.

== Composer ==
He composed many short pieces for violin and piano, which he included in his recital programmes and recorded. A Cradle Song of 1915 is dedicated to his second daughter and the Lullaby of 1923 to the third, Colleen. His Phantasy Quartet, Op. 8 of 1915 won the Cobbett Competition and was published by Hawkes & Son the following year. The Roumanian Air and Gipsy Dance, Op.23, was published by Hawkes in 1929. He also made editions of others' works and published books of studies and exercises. Among his pedagogical works are The Secret of Technique in Violin Playing, Op. 20 and the Virtuosic Studies, Op. 21 (1921), consisting of 38 studies in two books.

== Later life and death ==
He married his second wife Olive Hobday (the daughter of musicians Ethel Hobday and Alfred Charles Hobday) on 5 December 1921. Shortly after, they moved to Bognor Regis (in the same road as William Murdoch), where he lived for the rest of his life. Among other concertos in his repertoire were those by Beethoven, Brahms, Bruch, and the Mozart G major. During the Second World War, he continued his busy concert schedule around the UK, travelling by train, as well as appearing at the National Gallery concerts.

From 1946 Sammons spent less time playing and more teaching. As a teacher, he had worked at the Midland Institute in Birmingham from the 1920s, but from 1939 he taught privately and at the Royal College of Music. His pupils included Alan Loveday, Hugh Bean and Samuel Kutcher. He became a Fellow (FRCM) in 1944.

The onset of Parkinson's disease forced his retirement from public performance in June 1948. He attended a testimonial concert at the Royal Albert Hall on 7 December in a wheelchair, and heard a tribute from Arthur Bliss, with others in the programme from Joseph Szigeti, Fritz Kreisler and Sir Adrian Boult.

He died in Middleton-on-Sea in 1957, aged 71. Boult said of him after his death that he was distinguished by "his selfless interest in music-making of all kinds, whether in Queen's Hall or in some humble mission hall in far-off Wales or Scotland. He was a great musician in every sense of the word".

== Instruments ==
His violins included a Gofriller (he bought another 1696 Gofriller in 1927), a Felice Guadagnini, and a Nicolas Gagliano. At the Cobbett competition in February 1923 he played in a 'blind' comparison of a 1731 Stradivarius and a modern instrument by Alfred Vincent. When Sammons sold the Gofriller in 1951 he gave the new owner a list of all the works he had played on it.

== Premieres ==
As leader of the London String Quartet (1910–1919):

- 23 March 1914, Ralph Vaughan Williams: Phantasy Quintet (1912)
- 4 November 1915, Frank Bridge: String Quartet No 2
- 16 June 1916, Sally in our alley & Cherry Ripe arranged by Bridge
- 12 June 1917, John Ireland: Trio in one movement
- 17 November 1916, Frederick Delius: String Quartet (3 movements)
- 1 February 1919, Delius: String Quartet (4 movements)
- 26 April 1919, Edward Elgar: String Quartet and Piano Quintet (private performance)
- 21 May 1919, Elgar: String Quartet and Piano Quintet (public performance, with W. H. Reed, Raymond Jeremy and Felix Salmond; William Murdoch played in the Piano Quintet)

As soloist:

- March 1917, Ireland: Violin Sonata No. 2 (with William Murdoch)
- 30 January 1919, Delius: Violin Concerto
- 1 May 1920, Eugene Goossens: Violin Sonata
- 7 October 1924, Delius: Violin Sonata No 2 (with Murdoch)
- 20 March 1925 Herbert Howells: Violin Sonata No. 3
- 2 June 1930, Granville Bantock: Violin Sonata
- 20 January 1931, Goossens: Violin Sonata No. 2
- 14 July 1933, Guirne Creith: Violin Sonata No. 2
- 19 May 1936, Creith: Violin Concerto (BBC studio performance)
- 26 February 1937 Stanley Wilson: Concerto for Violin and Viola (with Bernard Shore)
- 26 November 1940, Edmund Rubbra: Violin Sonata No. 1
- 10 May 1942, George Dyson: Violin Concerto (with BBC broadcast)

== Recordings ==
Albert Sammons made his first recording in October 1908; his last was made on 16 April 1946 (Edmund Rubbra's 2nd sonata with Gerald Moore). Other recordings (with dates) include, as leader of the London String Quartet:

- various movements and extracts from string quartets
- Mozart K428, Beethoven op18/2 and Schumann op41/3
- (with Gervase Elwes) "On Wenlock Edge"

As a soloist:

- Elgar: Violin Concerto (abridged October 1916, complete 1929 – see below)
- Elgar: Violin Concerto (recorded by Columbia in London 18 March & 10 April 1929 with New Queen's Hall Orchestra under Sir Henry J. Wood [matrices WAX 4785–4794, 4846–7; released Dec. 1929 on 78s L2346/51]. The performance "possesses a fire, poetry and nobility that have rarely been matched, and certainly not surpassed" – review by Andrew Achenbach in Gramophone Oct. 1998. CD re-issues include Avid Masters AMSC587 [1998]; Pearl GEM0050 [1999]; Naxos Historical 8.110951 [2002])
- Bruch: Violin Concerto No. 1 (December 1925)
- Beethoven: Violin Concerto (March 1927, unpublished, matrixes destroyed)
- Mozart: Sinfonia Concertante (with Lionel Tertis) (September 1933)
- Moeran: Violin Concerto (live performance, April 1946)
- Delius: Violin Concerto (September 1944)
- Delius: Violin Sonatas (recorded in 1929, 1924, 1944)
- Elgar: Violin Sonata (recorded 2 February 1935)
