= William Murdoch (pianist) =

Australian pianist, composer and author (1888–1942)

William David Murdoch (10 February 1888 – 9 September 1942) was an Australian pianist, composer and author.

== Early life and education ==
Murdoch was born at Sandhurst (now Bendigo, Victoria), the son of Andrew Murdoch, an ironfounder, and his wife Annie, née Esler. At 11 years of age William began piano lessons and soon won several solo competitions. In 1903 he was awarded the first Bendigo Austral Scholarship. This entitled him to three years' tuition at Marshall-Hall's Conservatorium of Music, where he continued his studies under Eduard Scharf and W. A. Laver, later Ormond Professor of Music. In 1906 Murdoch won the Clarke Scholarship. (Note: The Clarke Scholarship was created under the same (School of Music) scheme as the Elder Overseas Scholarship in South Australia. It did not cover, for instance, the inescapable accommodation during the (lengthy) holidays and transport to concerts. Even during term only one meal was supplied, Monday to Friday. Not a problem for English students but potentially crippling for Colonials) Murdoch spent two miserable years (1907–1908) at the London College.

. . . years pregnant with doubt, disappointment and all kinds of fears; The gloomy climate, so different from that of sunny Victoria, affected his spirits. He was lonely, homesick — and only a boy.

He began taking assignments as accompanist and pianist at private functions, to some success. He subsequently made great progress, under the guidance of a Danish pianist and teacher, Frits Hartvigson. In his last two years at the college, he won every prize available: the Hopkinson gold and silver medals, the Challen gold and silver medals, the Dannreuther prize for concerto playing, and the Brinsmead grand piano.

== Career ==
On 5 August 1915 Murdoch married Ellen Josephine Tuckfield in London. In 1919 he participated in the premieres of Sir Edward Elgar's Violin Sonata in E minor and Piano Quintet in A minor.

When Murdoch's first wife, Ellen Josephine Tuckfield, died; he subsequently married divorcee Dorothy Violet Lang, née Mascall, on 21 March 1921. After she divorced him, married Antonia Dorothea Meek, née Simon, on 25 November 1925.

== Style ==
The critic William James Turner wrote in 1916: "Even when we get to the best pianists it is rarely, if ever, that we find a combination of exceptional technical mastery with tone-power, the delicacy of touch, brilliance, command of color, sensitiveness of phrasing, variety of feeling, imagination, and vital passion. Mr. Murdoch possesses all these qualities to a high degree" (ADB).

== Sources ==
- J. A. Provan, 'Murdoch, William David (1888 - 1942)', Australian Dictionary of Biography, Volume 10, MUP, 1986, pp. 632–633. Retrieved 2009-10-25
- Serle, Percival (1949). "Murdoch, William David". Dictionary of Australian Biography. Sydney: Angus & Robertson.
