= Aeolian Hall (London) =

Former art gallery and concert venue

Coordinates: 51.5121°N 0.1443°W

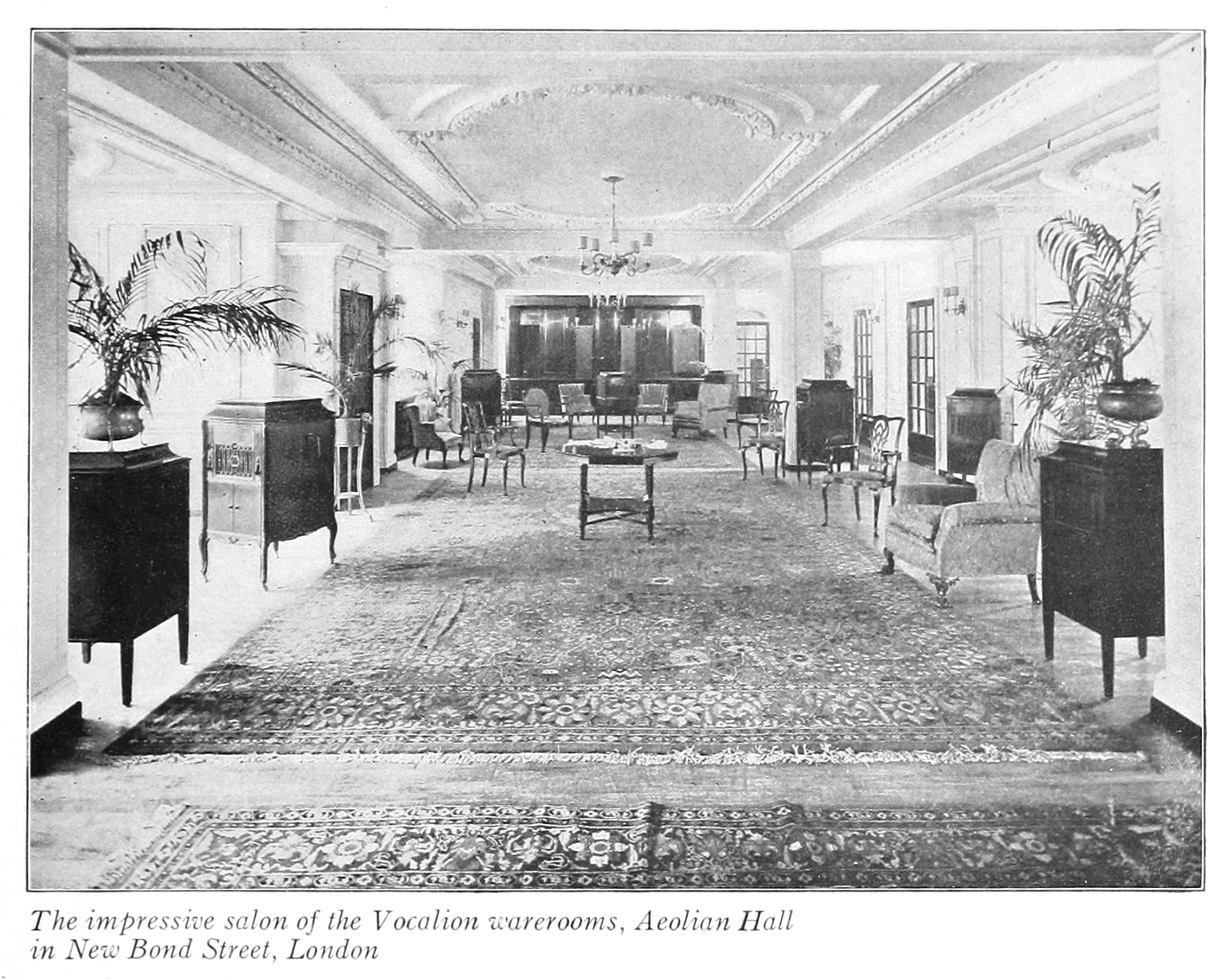
Salon of the Vocalion warerooms, Aeolian Hall (1916)

Aeolian Hall, at 135–137 New Bond Street in London, England, was an exhibition gallery, concert hall and (from 1943) a broadcasting studio theatre for the British Broadcasting Corporation.

== History ==
The building began life as the Grosvenor Gallery, being built by Coutts Lindsay in 1876, an accomplished amateur artist with a predilection for the aesthetic movement, for which he was held up to some ridicule. In 1883 he decided to light his gallery with electricity. An outhouse became a substation, and equipment was installed in the basement, which upset some of the neighbours, and caused others to buy electricity from him. Thus began the system of electrical distribution in use today, but the threat of fire ended these activities, and by 1890, Lindsay was forced to sell out to the Grosvenor Club.

By 1903 the whole building was taken over by the Orchestrelle Company of New York (the Aeolian Company). Manufacturers of musical instruments, especially the pianola, they converted the space into offices, a showroom, and a concert hall. The inaugural recital at Aeolian Hall took place on 19 January 1904.

Aeolian Hall was a popular venue for the Russian recitalist Vladimir Rosing. The hall was turned into an intimate opera house for one set of performances. In June 1921 Rosing presented, with the director Theodore Komisarjevsky and the conductor Adrian Boult, a season of Opera Intime, performing The Queen of Spades, The Barber of Seville, and Pagliacci. On 12 June 1923 the first performance of Facade, music by William Walton, poems by Edith Sitwell, took place.

== BBC Variety ==
After the destruction of their St George's Hall studios in March 1943, the BBC took it over for the recording of variety broadcasts, and for concerts and recitals. It was the home of BBC Variety for thirty years, and of programmes such as The Goon Show, Hancock's Half Hour, Trad Tavern (often featuring Chris Barber) and Just Fancy (1951–1962 comedy with Eric Barker and Deryck Guyler). By the early 1960s, twenty shows a week were being recorded or performed on the premises.

== Modern usage ==
In 2020 the Italian cashmere-specialist retailer Brunello Cucinelli re-located its flagship London store to the premises, placing a grand piano in a street-facing window as an acknowledgement of the building's past.
