= Bedham =

Hamlet in West Sussex, England

Coordinates: 50.97°N 00.56°W

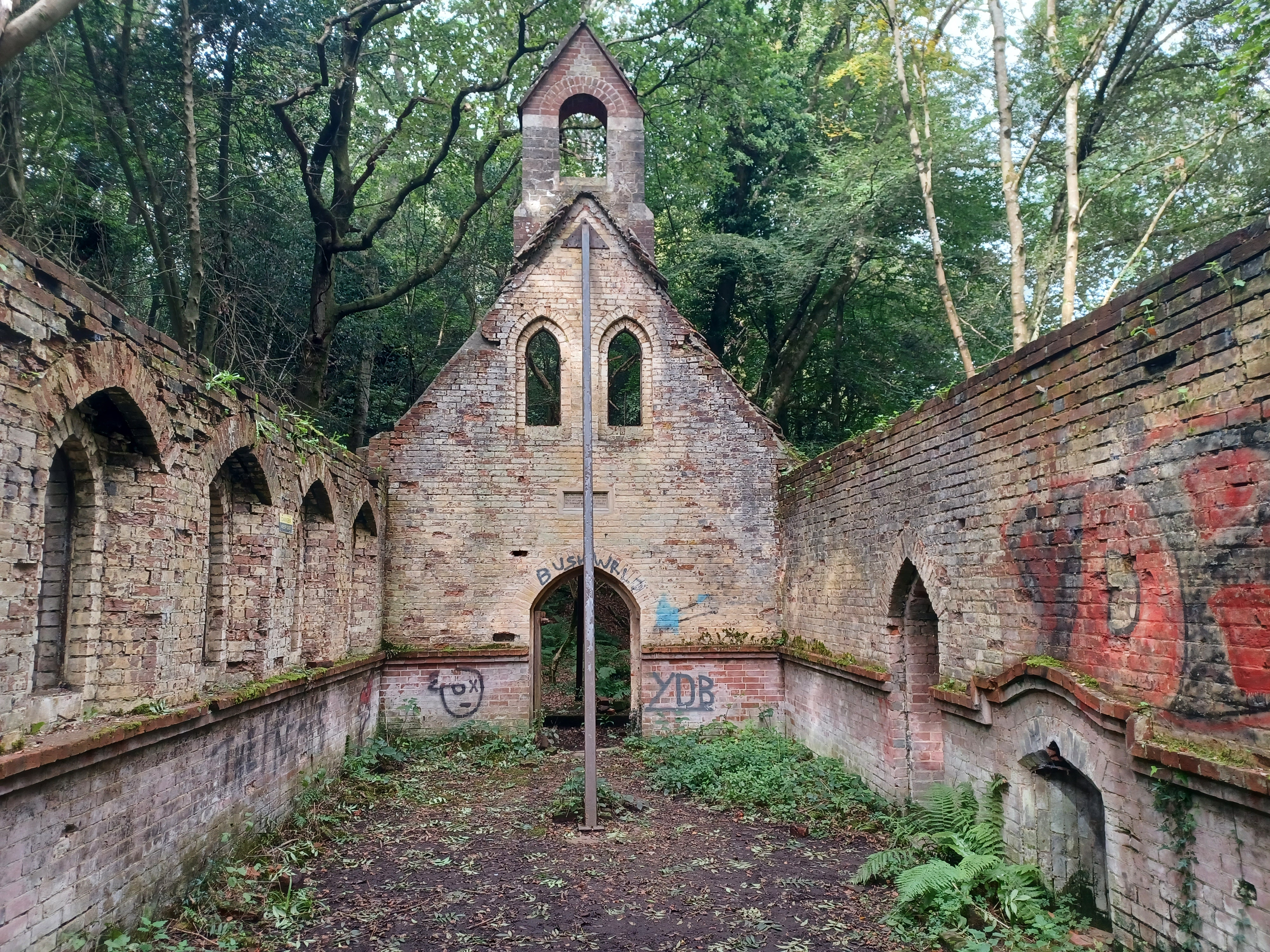
- The former Bedham Church and School

- Location within West Sussex
- OS grid reference: TQ0121
- District: Chichester District
- Shire county: West Sussex
- Region: South East
- Country: England
- Sovereign state: United Kingdom
- Post town: Pulborough
- Postcode district: RH20 1
- Dialling code: 01798
- Police: Sussex
- Fire: West Sussex
- Ambulance: South East Coast

Bedham is a hamlet 4 kilometres (2 1/2 miles) east of Petworth in the Chichester District of West Sussex, England. It is in the civil parish of Wisborough Green.

Bedham consists of a farm, a derelict Victorian church and school, and a scattering of houses set high on a wooded sandstone ridge of the western Weald, at 150 metres above sea level. To the west Flexham Park is an area of commercial woodland, with large areas of chestnut coppice, and south of this is a sandstone quarry at Bognor Common. To the northeast are large areas of semi-natural forest, left unmanaged as a nature reserve, called The Mens. South of The Mens is Hawkhurst Court, a country house formerly owned by Hamilton Cuffe, former Privy Counsellor and 1st Baron Desart [U.K. 1909] used as a Canadian army HQ in the buildup to the Normandy Invasion during World War II, then as a private school, before becoming private housing in the 1980s.

From the early 20th century Bedham became popular with artists of limited means who wanted to "escape from civilisation". Remote cottages could be bought for £100. The composer Sir Edward Elgar lived nearby at Brinkwells for a time as a sub-tenant of the artist Rex Vicat Cole, and the studio where Elgar composed his Cello Concerto was moved up to the village and now stands as a separate house. Ford Madox Ford, author of The Good Soldier also lived in the village with Stella Bowen, an Australian artist twenty years his junior. Later residents included Miss Ethel West (d.1950) and her companion Miss Metherell who lived in Bedham Cottage - Miss Metherell using the pen name Rhoda Leigh wrote a fictional account of the hamlet, Past and Passing: Tales from Remote Sussex, which offended some local residents with its thinly veiled and exaggerated references to them. One of those offended was Mrs. Puttick who sold groceries, tobacco and sweets from the kitchen of her house opposite the lane to Warren Barn.

Honour Thy Father - Recollections of Sussex Life over Two and a Half Centuries recounts much Bedham history centred on Mants, the cottage where its author Lillian Hunt's grandfather lived.

== Pronunciation ==
Bedham is traditionally pronounced with a heavy stress on the final syllable.

== History ==
In 1460 Bedham was home to William Hibberden, one of the members of parliament for Midhurst.

An agreement of 1769 between the owner of the manor, William Mitford of Pitshill at Tillington, and the tenants provided for the enclosure of common land to create woodland managed as coppice, although the areas involved are not specified.

In 1981 the Royal Logistic Corps considered the area for practising helicopter insertions of freight due to the hilly wooded nature of the area. The area was however dropped at the 7th of 10 stages of evaluation of areas across the U.K.

== Church and School ==
An ecclesiastical building, serving as both church and schoolhouse, St Michaels and All Angels Anglican Church was built in 1880 by William Townley Mitford MP and the Church of England to provide elementary education for children from the hamlet and surrounding area. Built in the style of a chapel it doubled up as the church on Sundays. The single room was divided by a curtain for infants and senior classes. At the end of the school week the chairs were turned to face the east and ink pots removed from the desks. In the 1930s services would be held there once or twice a month by the Rector of Fittleworth, with one of the local ladies playing the harmonium. The church finally closed in 1959 and is now a ruin.

== Notable residents ==
The painter Rex Vicat Cole rented a house called Brinkwells to the east of the Fittleworth to Wisborough Green road from around 1905 and he sublet it to Sir Edward Elgar between 1917 and 1921, at a time when Elgar was convalescing. During these years Elgar enjoyed learning craft skills from the woodmen at Flexham Park and composed his last four great works - the Violin Sonata in E minor, Op. 82, the String Quartet in E minor, Op. 83, the Quintet in A minor for Piano and String Quartet, Op. 84, and the sublime Cello Concerto in E minor, Op. 85. These works were said to be inspired by the local woods and by a strange legend of a clump of trees said to be the remains of Spanish monks who had engaged in sacrilegious ceremonies in the park and been struck by lightning. A film, "Elgar's Tenth Muse", starring James Fox as Elgar and directed by Paul Yule was produced in 1996 depicting this period.

Ford Madox Ford and his pregnant partner Stella Bowen moved to the 17th century Coopers Cottage, now called Cotford, in September 1920. Their daughter Esther Julia was born in November 1920. Letters between the couple show that they kept some ducks and were helped with the garden by a neighbour called Standing. They were spied on there by Ford's former mistress Violet Hunt who "tracked them down in Bedham and hung over the fence of their cottage watching them..."
