= Brodsky Quartet (disambiguation) =

Three separate Brodsky Quartet are known to have existed:

- Brodsky Quartet (Adolph Brodsky Leipzig), established by Adolph Brodsky in Leipzig around 1889
- Brodsky Quartet (Adolph Brodsky Manchester), established by Adolph Brodsky in Manchester around 1895
- Brodsky Quartet, a contemporary quartet formed in 1972, named in honour of Adolph Brodsky.
- Adolph Brodsky, also played second violin for the Hellmesberger Quartet until 1870
