= Anton Hekking =

Dutch cellist (1856–1935)

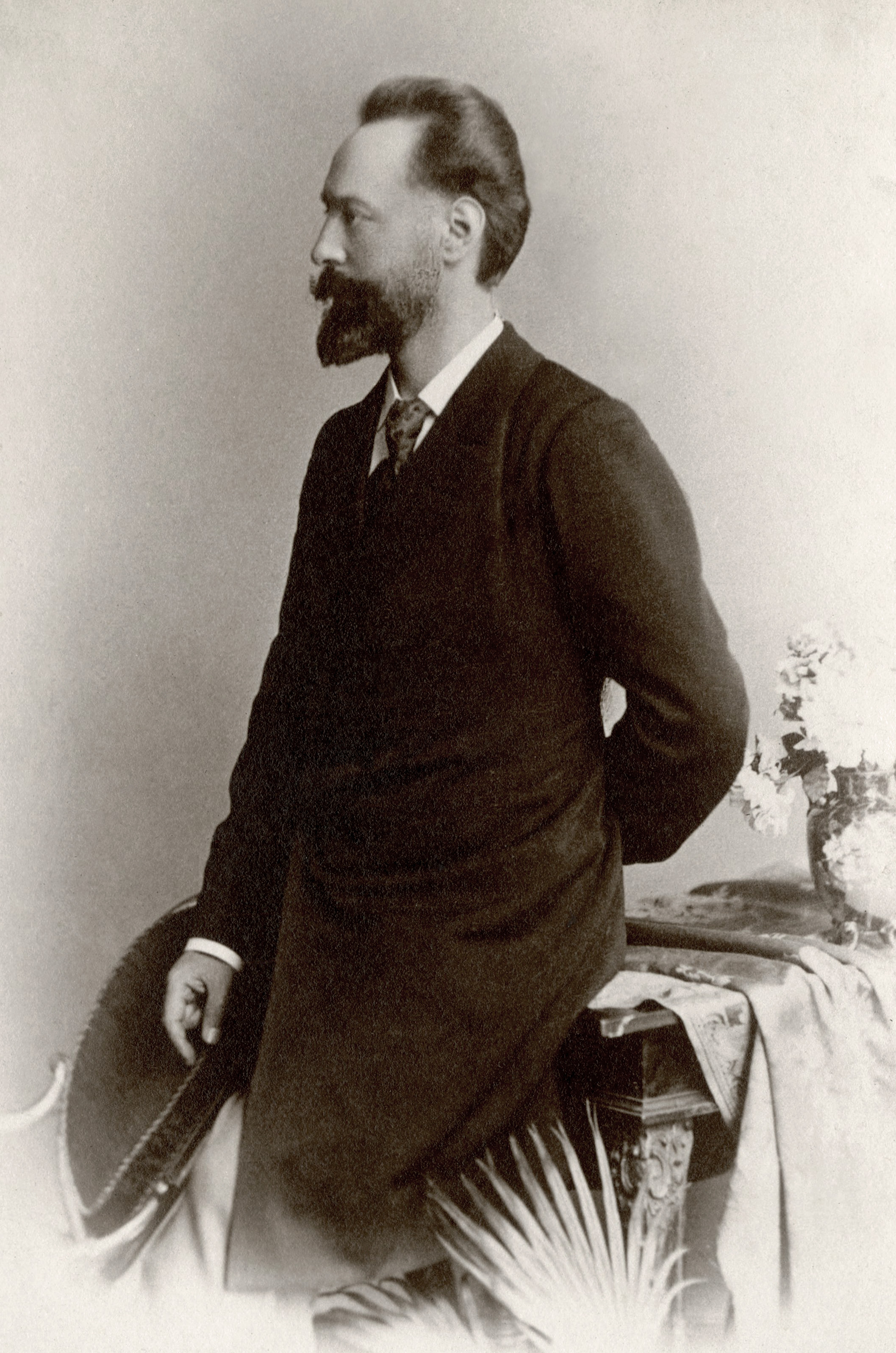
Anton Hekking in New York, c. 1891–1893

Johannes Francis Anton Hekking (7 September 1856 – 18 November 1935) was a Dutch cellist and teacher.

== Education ==
Anton Hekking was born in The Hague on 7 September 1856, to a musical family that also produced other notable cellists, including André Hekking (1866–1925) and Gérard Hekking (1879–1942), both of whom made their careers chiefly in France. (Note: There is confusion in the sources about the family tree: some state that André Hekking was Anton's brother and Gérard Hekking was his cousin, while others state that André was Anton's cousin and Gérard was his nephew.) Anton was taught first by his father, Gerard Hekking, who was himself a musician, and then, starting at age 12, by Joseph Giese (1821–1903) at the Hague Conservatory. At the age of 16 he became the principal cellist of the Utrecht orchestra. A few years later he moved to Paris to study with cellists Pierre Chevillard and Léon Jacquard at the Paris Conservatoire, where he won the premier prix for cello in 1878.

== Performing career ==
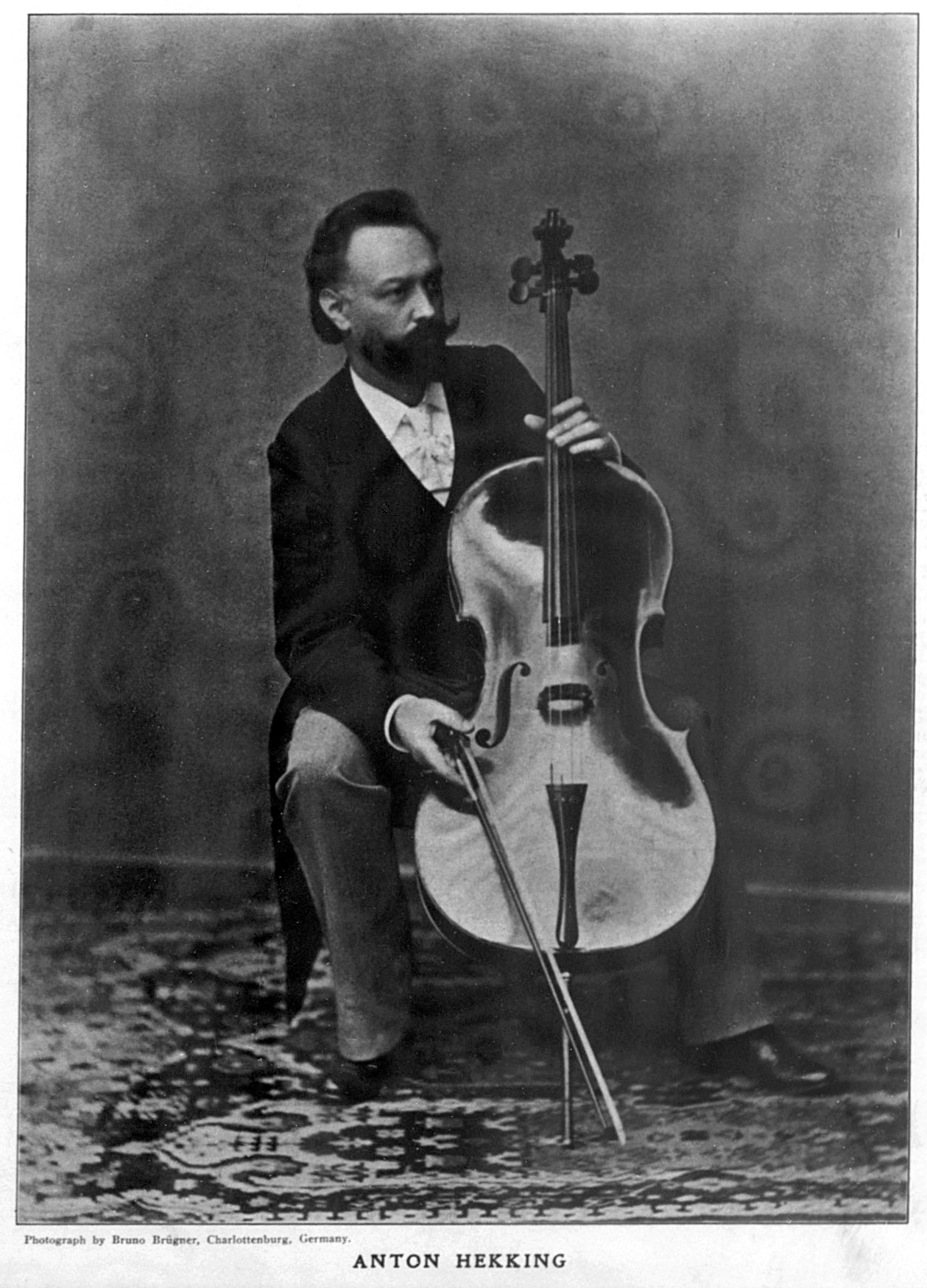
Anton Hekking in Berlin, c. 1893–1904

After a series of concert tours that included performances with the Russian pianist Anna Yesipova, in 1880 Hekking accepted the position of solo cellist with the Bilseschen Kapelle orchestra led by Benjamin Bilse in Berlin. In 1882, he was one of a group of 54 musicians who left Bilse in order to form the Berlin Philharmonic Orchestra, where Hekking served as the principal cellist from 1882 until 1888. During this time he also toured Europe for fifteen months with the Belgian violinist Eugène Ysaÿe, and was awarded the Order of the Golden Lion of Nassau by William III of the Netherlands.

In 1888, Hekking visited North America for the first time. A tour with the Mendelssohn Quintette Club in the winter of 1888–1889 included stops in 134 cities. In the fall of 1889 he accepted a position as the principal cellist of the Boston Symphony Orchestra under conductor Arthur Nikisch, where he remained for two seasons (1889–1891), followed by two seasons as the principal cellist of Walter Damrosch's New York Symphony Orchestra (1891–1893). In 1893 he returned to Berlin.

In 1896 he joined the faculty of the Stern Conservatory in Berlin, and in 1898 he began his second tenure as solo cellist of the Berlin Philharmonic, now conducted by Arthur Nikisch, where he remained until 1902. He was given a special contract that required him to play only twice a week at the orchestra's principal concerts; he was excused from rehearsals and other duties, and given ample time off for concert tours and appearances with other orchestras.

== Chamber ensembles ==
In addition to his work with orchestras and as a solo artist, Hekking was a member of several notable chamber ensembles. For his American tour in 1888–1889, he joined the historic Mendelssohn Quintette Club, established in 1849. While serving as principal cellist of the Boston Symphony Orchestra in 1889–1891, he was part of the Kneisel Quartet, founded in 1885 by Franz Kneisel, Hekking's former colleague in the Bilse orchestra and now the concertmaster of the Boston Symphony. When he moved on to the New York Symphony Orchestra in 1891, he and other first-desk players formed the New York Symphony Quartet, led by concertmaster Adolph Brodsky, who also established the better-known Brodsky Quartets in Leipzig (1884) and Manchester (1895). In 1896, following his return to Berlin, he replaced cellist Leo Schrattenholz in the Holländer Quartet, originally formed in 1894 by Gustav Holländer (1855–1915), Hekking's colleague at the Stern Conservatory.

In 1902 Hekking formed a trio with two younger musicians, violinist Alfred Wittenberg (1880–1952) and pianist Artur Schnabel (1882–1951). (Note: Known at the time as the Hekking Trio, but now usually referred to as "the first Schnabel trio", because of the fame of the pianist.) The trio was known for a series of inexpensive "Trio-Abende" in Berlin, in which standard works of the chamber repertoire alternated with solos and duets by individual members of the group; it also introduced a number of new works by contemporary composers. The concerts were a critical and popular success, with as many as 14 sold-out performances in a single season, and they continued until 1909 (although Schnabel was replaced by the American pianist Clarence Adler in 1907).

== Sources ==
- Abell, Arthur M. (21 November 1898). "Violin Echoes". The Musical Courier. 37 (21): 18.
- Adler, Clarence (March 1955). "My First Meeting with Rafael Joseffy". Piano Guild Notes. 4 (9): 11.
- "Anton Hekking". The Musical Courier. 49 (5): 11. 3 August 1904.
- "Chat about Men and Women". Boston Commonwealth. Vol. 33, no. 4. 2 September 1893. p. 10.
- Constant, Pierre (1900). Le Conservatoire national de musique et de déclamation: Documents historiques et administratifs. Paris: Imprimerie national.
- Cowden, Robert H. (1989). Instrumental Virtuosi: A Bibliography of Biographical Materials. Westport, CT: Greenwood Press. ISBN 978-0-313-26075-9.
- Ehrlich, A. (1898). Das Streich-Quartett in Wort und Bild. Leipzig: A. H. Payne. p. 54.
- O. F. (21 October 1896). "Berlin Branch Budget". The Musical Courier. 33 (17): 5.
- O. F. (14 November 1898). "Berlin Branch Budget". The Musical Courier. 37 (20): 5–7.
- "First Symphony Society Concert". The Musical Courier. 23 (21): 579–580. 18 November 1891.
- Fritzsch, E. W., ed. (1893). "Vermischte Mittheilungen und Notizien". Muskalisches Wochenblatt. 24: 463.
- Howe, M. A. de Wolfe (1914). The Boston Symphony Orchestra: An Historical Sketch. Boston: Atlantic Monthly Press.
- Hurst, Fannie (8 November 1963). "A Sketch of Clarence Adler". Congressional Record - Appendix: A6987–A6988.
- "Kneisel Quartet to End Long Career". Musical America. 25 (20): 48. 17 March 1917.
- Ledbetter, Stephen (200). "Kneisel Quartet". Grove Music Online (8th ed.). Oxford University Press. ISBN 978-1-56159-263-0. (subscription, Wikilibrary access, or UK public library membership required)
- "A New Quartet Club". The Musical Courier. 23 (24): 677. 9 December 1891.
- "New York Symphony Orchestra". The Musical Record (381): 9. October 1893.
- Phelps, Roger P. (1960). "The Mendelssohn Quintet Club: A Milestone in American Music Education". Journal of Research in Music Education. 8 (1): 39–44. doi:10.2307/3344236. JSTOR 3344236.
- Saerchinger, César (1957). Artur Schnabel: A Biography. New York: Dodd, Mead, and Co. pp. 76–79.
- Straeten, Edmund S. J. van der (1914). History of the Violoncello, the Viol da Gamba, Their Precursors and Collateral Instruments. London: William Reeves.
- Trowell, Garnet C.; Trowell, T. Arnold (May 1908). "Violoncellists Past and Present". The Strad. 19 (217): 331–334.
- Violoncellisten der Gegenwart in Wort und Bild. Hamburg: A.-G. 1903.
- Wilson, G. H. (1892). The Musical Yearbook of the United States: Season of 1891–1892. Worcester, MA: Charles Hamilton. p. 58.
