= Adolph Brodsky =

Russian violinist

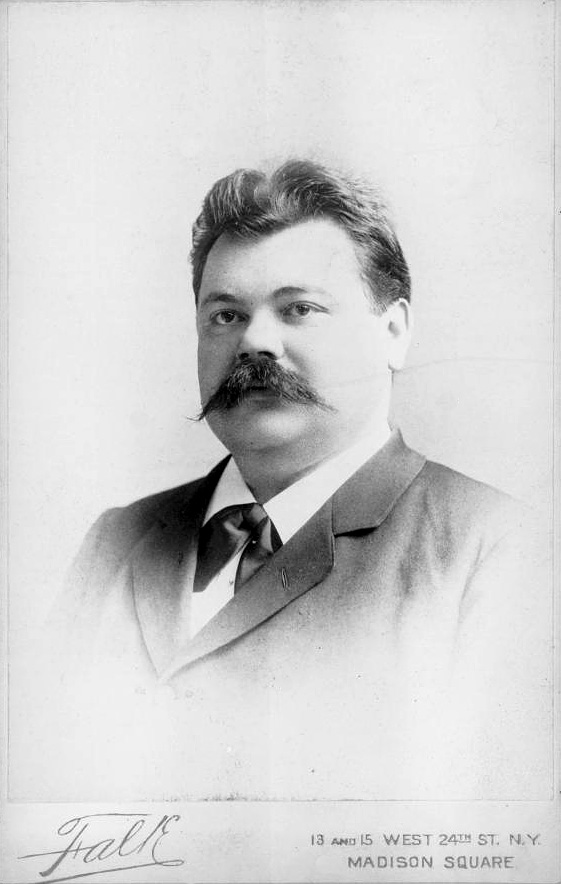
Adolph Brodsky in New York (photo by Benjamin J. Falk)

Adolph Davidovich Brodsky (Russian: Адольф Давидович Бродский, Adolf Davidovič Brodskij; 2 April [O.S. 21 March] 1851 – 22 January 1929) was a Russian violinist who later moved to the United States.

Brodsky had a long career as a performer and teacher, working in Vienna, Moscow, Leipzig, New York City, and Manchester. Throughout his career, he worked with composers such as Johannes Brahms, Pyotr Ilyich Tchaikovsky, and Edward Elgar.

== Biography ==
He was born into an assimilated Jewish family in Taganrog on the Sea of Azov. His grandfather and father were also violinists. He started music lessons at the age of five, a year after he first played his first violin, which he had bought at a fair. For four years he was taught music in his home town. Aged nine, he gave his first concert in Odessa, where a wealthy person heard him and was so impressed that they provided Brodsky with the funds to study in Vienna. In 1860, he immediately started his studies at the Vienna Conservatory with Joseph Hellmesberger, Sr. In Vienna, Brodsky met fellow student Hans Richter, with whom he became friends. Hellmesberger gave Brodsky the opportunity to play at numerous concerts and invited him to join the Hellmesberger Quartet to play second violin.

From 1866 to 1868 Brodsky was a member of the court orchestra. After ten years in Vienna, he toured for four years giving concerts. (One source says he toured Europe, another says Russia). After the tour he settled in Moscow in 1873. Contrary to what some sources say, he did not study with Ferdinand Laub. In 1875, Brodsky became second professor of violin at the Moscow Conservatory, where he remained for four years.

In 1880 he married Anna Lvovna Skadovskaya in Sebastopol. On 4 December 1881 Brodsky premiered Tchaikovsky's Violin Concerto in D major in Vienna, under the baton of Richter. Brodsky was the dedicatee of the concerto, after Tchaikovsky decided to withdraw the dedication from Leopold Auer, offended that the latter would not to play it unless the composer made certain changes incorporating his unsolicited suggestions. Brodsky had also premiered Tchaikovsky's Sérénade mélancolique in Moscow in 1876. It, too, had been initially dedicated to Leopold Auer, and it, too, had had its dedication withdrawn by the composer (although not reassigned to Brodsky in this case). This was not because of any criticism Auer had made of the Sérénade mélancolique, but was part of Tchaikovsky's reaction to Auer's issues with the Violin Concerto.

Later on, in 1883, after Henry Schradieck moved to the College of Music of Cincinnati, Brodsky was called to fill his position at the Leipzig Conservatoire. He remained in Leipzig until 1891. He formed there his own string quartet, the Brodsky Quartet initially with Ottokar Nováček (2nd violin), Hans Sitt (viola) and Leopold Grützmacher (violoncello). Upon Brodsky's later departure for the United States, Arno Hilf replaced him both as professor in the Leipzig Conservatoire and in the string quartet ensemble.

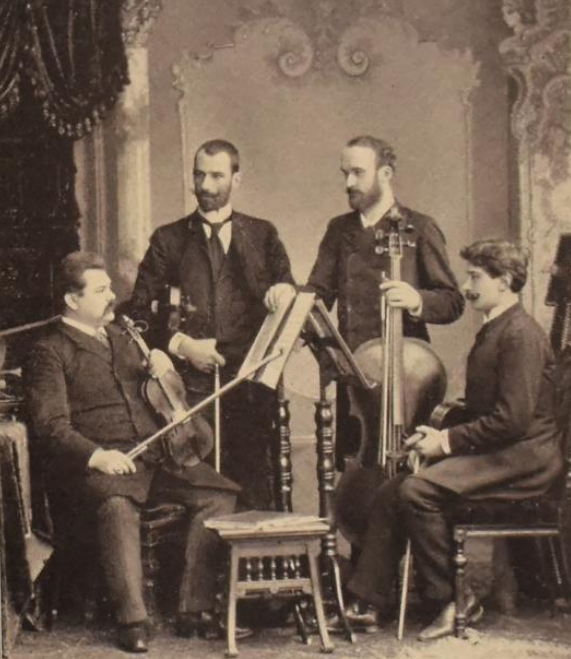
Adolph Brodsky, Hans Becker, Julius Klengel and Ottokar Nováček

In October 1891, Walter Damrosch invited Brodsky to become concertmaster of the New York Symphony Orchestra. Brodsky settled in New York City with his wife. In 1894, after three years in the United States, he returned to Europe, with a short stay in Berlin; while he was there Sir Charles Hallé invited him to Manchester to teach at the Royal Manchester College of Music, and direct the Hallé Orchestra. He taught at the College from 1895 until his death, becoming principal in 1896. It was in England that he changed the spelling of his first name to Adolph. Among his pupils at Manchester was Arthur Catterall, who later became a fellow professor at the College. While in Manchester he established his second Brodsky Quartet with Rawdon Briggs, Simon Speelman, and Carl Fuchs.

Brodsky worked on several occasions with Edward Elgar. He admired Elgar and had the opportunity to meet him in February 1900, when Richter introduced them following a performance of the Enigma Variations Richter conducted in Manchester. Carl Fuchs asked Elgar to compose a string quartet for the Brodsky Quartet. Several years later, in 1918, Elgar completed his String Quartet in E minor, Op. 83 and dedicated it to the quartet.

In January 1927, as part of a series of events celebrating Elgar's 70 years of life, Elgar conducted the Hallé Orchestra in a performance of his Violin Concerto. Brodsky, then 75 years old and retired, was the soloist that night.

He died on 22 January 1929 in England.

== Legacy and honors ==
While he was in Leipzig, Brodsky held a Christmas dinner, at which Johannes Brahms, Tchaikovsky and Edvard Grieg met. This sparked a friendship between Tchaikovsky and Grieg, who held high esteem for each other. (Brahms and Tchaikovsky, however, never liked or understood each other's music, although they had cordial and respectful relations personally.)

Brodsky was honoured with the Norwegian Order of St. Olaf in 1892. During the celebrations of its 50th Jubilee in February 1902, Victoria University conferred upon him an honorary Doctor of Music degree.

Brodsky was in possession of a Guarnerius violin, previously owned by Charles Philippe Lafont.

The British Brodsky Quartet is named in his honour.
