= Piano Quartet in C minor =

Piano Quartet in C minor may refer to:

- Piano Quartet in C minor (Schumann)
- Piano Quartet No. 1 (Mendelssohn)
- Piano Quartet No. 3 (Brahms)
- Piano Quartet No. 1 (Fauré)
- Piano Quartet (Strauss)
