= Fittleworth =

Village and parish in West Sussex, England

Coordinates: 50.96527°N 0.56381°W

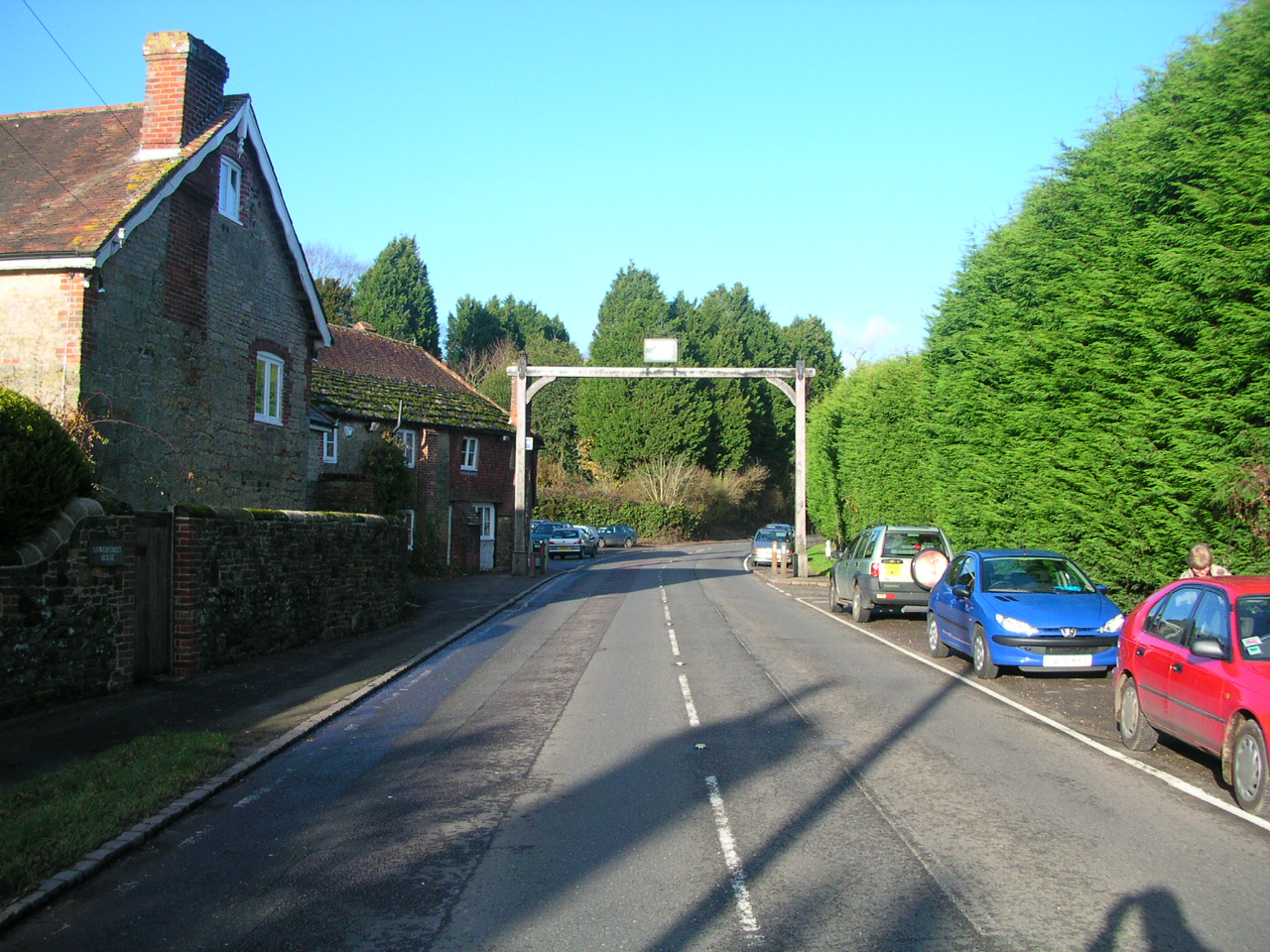
- The southern approach at The Swan

- Location within West Sussex
- Area: 11.64 km^{2} (4.49 sq mi)
- Population: 978 2011 Census
  - Density: 80/km^{2} (210/sq mi)
- OS grid reference: TQ009194
  - London: 42 miles (68 km) NNE
- Civil parish: Fittleworth
- District: Chichester
- Shire county: West Sussex
- Region: South East
- Country: England
- Sovereign state: United Kingdom
- Post town: PULBOROUGH
- Postcode district: RH20
- Dialling code: 01798
- Police: Sussex
- Fire: West Sussex
- Ambulance: South East Coast
- UK Parliament: Arundel and South Downs

Fittleworth is a village and civil parish in the District of Chichester in West Sussex, England located seven kilometres (4.3 miles) west from Pulborough on the A283 road and three miles (4.8 km) south east from Petworth. The village has an Anglican church, a primary school and one pub, The Swan. It is within the ancient divisions of the Bury Hundred and the Rape (county subdivision) of Arundel. The village is bounded south by the Rother Navigation.

In the 2001 census the parish covered 1,164 hectares (2,880 acres) and had 405 households with a total population of 931 people, of whom 434 were economically active. The 2011 Census included the hamlets of Egdean and Stopham and had a population of 978.

== History ==
Fittleworth is noted in 1167–8 as Fitelwurda, by 1279 Fyteleworth, 1438 Fetilworth and 1488 Fitelworthe. The Olde English FitelanweorJ translates as " the enclosure of Fitela." A Fitela happens to be mentioned in the Anglo-Saxon epic poem Beowulf as nephew of mythological hero Sigmund.

The manor of Fittleworth, in the reign of Edward I, was held by William Dawtrey and subsequently by the Bishopric of Chichester

The Lee and Stanley families were major landowners in Fittleworth through the centuries, as well as the Duke of Norfolk. Also among major property owners were the families of Levett and Edsaw.

From 1536 The Swan was the coaching inn, and permitted a change of horses for the royal couriers of the King's Post en route from London to the coast, before the long climb up the South Downs at Bury Hill.

The village was served by Fittleworth railway station, now a private dwelling, on a branch line of the now-defunct Midhurst Railways, from 1889 to 1963.

== Landmarks ==
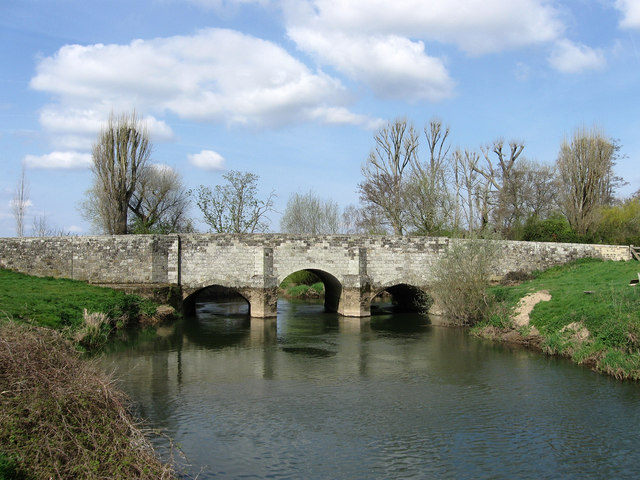
Fittleworth Bridge over the Rother Navigation

There are two bridges at Fittleworth, both of stone; one of two arches, the Clappers Bridge, belongs only to the mill stream; the other, of three, spans the River Rother and is sixteenth century, though the piers may be older. The middle span was enlarged in the 1780s to take barge traffic through to Midhurst. When the road was widened in 1967, the Clappers Bridge was rebuilt in entirety. Fittleworth Bridge was partially rebuilt to take a 25-foot road about twice the previous width.

The Swan on the north side of the Rother Navigation is a coaching inn with history possibly going as far back as the late 14th century. The Ancient Order of Froth Blowers (Motto: "Lubrication in Moderation") was founded here in 1924. The guild was created "to foster the noble Art and gentle and healthy Pastime of froth blowing amongst Gentlemen of-leisure and ex-Soldiers". It attracted an extraordinary half a million members in the 1920s and 1930s. Lager beer was ineligible, The Swan rule book stating: "it is unseemly and should be avoided always excepting by Naval Officers visiting German Colonies.". Many Victorian Artists have left paintings on the panelling of the lounge, including George Cole, Rex Vicat Cole (who sub-let his nearby cottage Brinkwells to Edward Elgar in 1917), A.W. Weedon and Philip Stretton. One of the Visitors' Books contains music and words to 'A Song to the River' by composer Sir Hubert Parry visiting for a boating trip. E.V. Lucas, Lamb's biographer, thought it the most ingeniously placed inn in the world. "It seems to be at the end of all things. The miles of road that one has travelled apparently have been leading nowhere but the Swan."

Coates Castle in the village of Coates, West Sussex is a Grade-II mansion about one and half miles south east from the southern boundary of Fittleworth. An area around Coates Castle has been designated as a Site of Special Scientific Interest which contains the entire known remaining British population of the Field Cricket Gryllus campestris.

== Famous residents ==
Explorer and broadcaster Duncan Carse lived in the village for over 40 years until his death in 2004.

The composer Edward Elgar lived in a house called "Brinkwells" near Fittleworth from 1917 to 1921. It was here that he composed his last four major works: the Violin Sonata in E minor, the String Quartet in E minor, the Piano Quintet in A minor and the Cello Concerto in E minor.

A. B. Simpson widely credited as the "inventor" of a method of harmonic tuning church bells, publishing two papers in the Pall Mall Magazine in 1895 and 1896. These two articles revolutionised bell tuning, and allowed for the great growth of carillons and other tower bell instruments that began in the early part of the twentieth century. The first set of bells founded under Simpson's principles, cast by Taylor's of Loughborough, now form the basis of the carillon at Iowa State University, Ames, Iowa.

The artist Charles Henry Sims lived there in the early 20th century.

Sculptor Alan Thornhill spent his childhood, between 1925 and 1936 here, his family building 'Rotherwood'.

Reginald Rex Vicat Cole (1870–1940) was an English landscape painter, and founded a School of Painting together with Byam Shaw. The Byam Shaw and Vicat Cole School of Art was based in Kensington.

Architect Clough Williams-Ellis produced designs in 1914 and 1929 for Little Bognor's Maxse family. He also made a design for a Hesworth Common War Memorial.

Bryan Ferry, the English singer songwriter lives locally.

== Cultural references ==
The Fittleworth Iphigenia was identified as an important Roman sculpture in 2012 after being discovered in the parish by sculptor Jon Edgar.

Ford Madox Ford lived in neighbouring Bedham during 1920 and 1921. In The Last Post, part of his tetralogy Parade's End, Sylvia stays with Lord and Lady Fittleworth.

George 'Boko' Fittleworth – Bertie Wooster's friend – was a fictional character of P.G. Wodehouse. Pelham Grenville Wodehouse was born near Guildford; knowledge of this area may be a clue to his inventiveness.

Author Hugo Donnelly spent a year in Fittleworth in the 1960s as a young waiter at The Swan and his writings are included in the anthology Sussex Seams. References to a resting Explorer – perhaps Carse – and revisiting the sites of Elgar's newfound creative inspiration in Fittleworth Woods are accompanied by notes on other famous visitors to stay at The Swan, including Elgar and Rudyard Kipling, who motored from Rottingdean – 3 hours and noted this in the visitor's book in 1901. Writer Algernon Blackwood visited Elgar at Brinkwells, and Elgar's wife Alice noted that the slow movement of Elgar's new Violin Sonata composed at "Brinkwells" seemed to be influenced by the 'wood magic' or genii loci of Fittleworth woods.

Donnelly also refers to the Explorer lending him the book Some West Sussex Superstitions Lingering in 1868 collected by Charlotte Latham from the cottage-people of Fittleworth while she lived at the Old Rectory of St. Mary's Church. The village has a rich tradition of snake lore. As late as 1860 there are sincere accounts of an 'audaciously large' dragon which would rush out of its lair in Fittleworth woods 'with a terrible hissing', to terrorise passing cottage-people.

Hilaire Belloc mentions Fittleworth 'where the Inn has painted panels' in his thoughts of Sussex, within one of his best known works The Path to Rome (1902).

=== Paintings of Fittleworth Mill ===
A c.1826 painting by J. M. W. Turner is in the collection of the Tate. An 1834 painting by John Constable is in the Victoria and Albert Museum, painted whilst visiting Lord Egremont at Petworth, where he encountered sculptor Francis Leggatt Chantrey and painter Thomas Phillips, Turner having been unable to come. Constable took home richly coloured sand and soil from Fittleworth Common and subsequently asked his Arundel-based brewer friend and amateur painter George Constable to send him samples of the paint from some slimy posts near the Mill.

== External links and further reading ==
- Parish council website
- Fittleworth Railway Station pictures
- Fittleworth – A Time of Change 1895–1916 (2009) Ed. A. Brookfield ISBN 978-0-9564125-0-8 Reuniting the Photographic Albums and Notes of John Smith 1852–1925
