= Brodsky Quartet =

British string quartet, set up in 1972

- Origin: Middlesbrough, North Yorkshire, England
- Genres: Classical music, Contemporary classical
- Occupation: Chamber ensemble
- Years active: 1972–present
- Website: www.brodskyquartet.co.uk

The Brodsky Quartet is a British string quartet active in since 1972. The ensemble primarily performs and records classical music though they have also commissioned works by contemporary composers and collaborated with music performers in a wide range of genre.

== Repertoire ==
The ensemble's classical repertoire include works by Haydn, Beethoven, Schubert, Bartók, Zemlinsky, Brahms, Debussy, Ravel and Shostakovich.

They have collaborated with such rock and pop figures as Björk, Elvis Costello, Sting, Katie Noonan and Paul McCartney. With Elvis Costello they co-wrote the Juliet Letters, released and toured in 1993. They perform the "Strings" on Björk's Family Tree box set. This material mostly comes from concerts Björk and the Brodsky gave at London's Union Chapel in December 1999.

The Quartet has commissioned many contemporary composers including Errolynn Wallen, Isidora Zebeljan, Elena Virsova, Andrea Tarodi, Theo Verbey, Javier Alvarez, John Tavener, Andrew Ford, Julian Nott and George Grundmann, and championed new work from composers such as Mario Lavista, Osvaldo Golijov and Peter Sculthorpe.

The Brodsky Quartet are also known for their arranging of non-quartet repertoire for use as concert encores. These have been compiled into various recordings, including Brodsky Unlimited, Petits Fours and Golden Oldies. They have worked in music theatre productions including Complicité's The Noise of Time, Brian Friel's Performances (with Rosamund Pike and Henry Goodman) and Bill Barclay's Letters to a Young Poet.

== History ==
The quartet was initially formed in Middlesbrough, North Yorkshire, in 1972 as the "Cleveland Quartet", and subsequently named for Russian violinist Adolph Brodsky.

In May 1998 the Brodsky Quartet was presented with a Royal Philharmonic Society Award for an outstanding contribution to innovation in programming. In 1999 they received Honorary Fellowship at Teesside University and in 2004 they were awarded an Honorary Doctorate at the University of Kent.

As well as their performance and recording work, the Brodsky Quartet was Quartet in Residence at Cambridge University in the 1980s, International Chair of Chamber Music at the Royal Conservatoire of Scotland from 2007 and holds visiting residencies at many establishments worldwide. For fourteen years they taught and performed at the Dartington International Summer School.

== Recordings ==
The Brodsky Quartet has a discography of over seventy recordings, having been signed by IMP, ASV, Teldec, Challenge, Vanguard, Warner, Autor, Brodsky Records, SOMM, Kim, Silva Classics, Orchid, CPO, Hybrid and latterly Chandos. They left Chandos in 2023, deciding to end their recording career, following three releases to mark their 50th anniversary; Rocking Horse Road with Jacqui Dankworth, Schubert's Cello Quintet with Laura Van Der Heijden and Golden Oldies, a compilation of their encore arrangements. They have collaborated with singers and instrumentalists worldwide, including Sir Willard White, Natasha Kudritskaya, Michael Collins, Joan-Enric Lluna, Leon Bosch, Laura van den Heijden, Natalie Clein, Anne-Sofie von Otter, Martin Roscoe, Tunde Jegede, John Harle, Craig Ogden, Martin Fröst, Nobuko Imai, Ryota Komatsu, Eddie Perfect and David Hansen.

== Members ==
The original members in 1972 were:

- Michael Thomas
- Ian Belton
- Alexander Robertson
- Jacqueline Thomas

In 1982, Robertson was replaced by Paul Cassidy. In 1999, Michael Thomas was replaced by Andrew Haveron. In 2007, Haveron was replaced by violinist Daniel Rowland. In 2019, Rowland was replaced as first violinist by Gina McCormack. In 2021, McCormack was replaced as first violinist by Krysia Osostowicz. As of 2026, the members are:

- Krysia Osostowicz, violin
- Ian Belton, violin
- Paul Cassidy, viola
- Jacqueline Thomas, cello

== Awards and nominations ==
- Edison Prize (The Juliet Letters)
- Choc Du Monde
- Royal Philharmonic Prize

=== ARIA Music Awards ===
The ARIA Music Awards is an annual awards ceremony that recognises excellence, innovation, and achievement across all genres of Australian music.

Year	Nominee / work	Award	Result	Ref.
2016	With Love and Fury (with Katie Noonan)	Best Classical Album	Nominated	

== Namesake ==
The Brodsky Quartet is not the first quartet of that name. They are named for Russian violinist Adolph Brodsky (1851–1929), who performed the world premiere of the Tchaikovsky Violin Concerto and was founder of two quartets under the Brodsky name. In 1918 Edward Elgar dedicated his String Quartet in E minor, Op. 83 to the 2nd Adolph Brodsky quartet.
