= Brodsky Quartet (Adolph Brodsky Leipzig) =

String quartet established 1884 in Leipzig

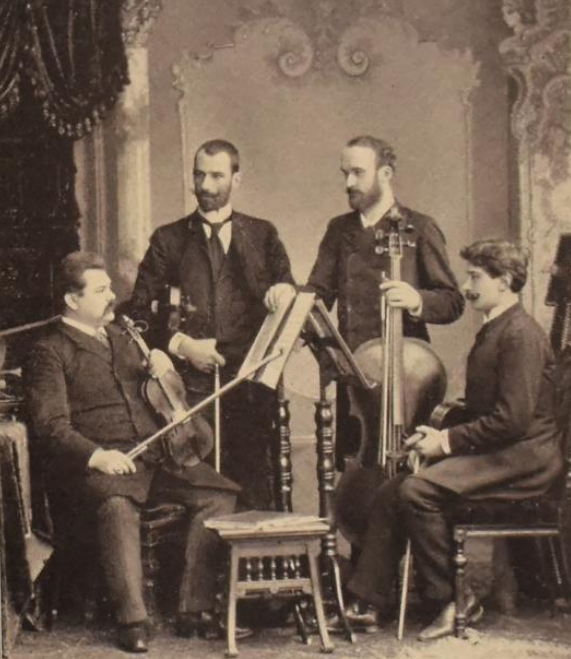
Adolph Brodsky, Hans Becker, Julius Klengel and Ottokar Nováček

The Brodsky Quartet was a string quartet led by Adolph Brodsky. It was established on 1884, while Brodsky was professor at the Leipzig Conservatoire. The founding members, aside from Brodsky (1st violin) were Ottokar Nováček (2nd violin), Hans Sitt (viola) and Leopold Grützmacher (violoncello).

In 1885, Hans Becker replaced Nováček (2nd violin) and Julius Klengel replaced Grützmacher. In 1888, Sitt was replaced by Nováček (viola), a former student of Brodsky. In 1891, Sitt replaced Nováček (viola) again and Arno Hilf replaced Brodsky, as the latter moved to the United States, accepting the invitation by Walter Damrosch to become concertmaster of the New York Symphony Orchestra. The quartet was renowned internationally and toured Russia (1889), Denmark (1890) and Italy (1891) as well as Germany.

In 1895, Brodsky formed a second quartet named Brodsky Quartet, when he settled in Manchester. Several years after an 1890 request by that quartet's cellist Carl Fuchs, Edward Elgar composed in 1918 his String Quartet in E minor, Op. 83 and dedicated it to the quartet.
