= Heinrich Schachtebeck =

German violinist and conductor

- Born: 6 August 1886; Diemarden
- Died: 12 March 1965 (aged 78); Leipzig
- Occupations: Conductor; Composer; Music critic
- Organizations: Hamburg State Opera; Leipzig Opera

August Louis Hermann Heinrich Schachtebeck (6 August 1886 – 12 March 1965) was a German violinist, conductor and university lecturer.

== Life ==
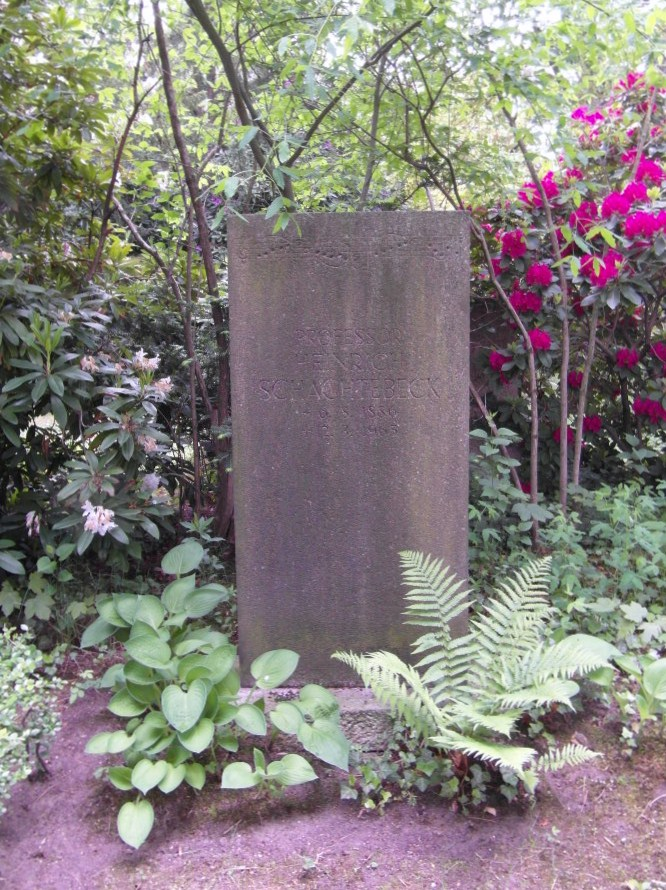
Schachtebeck's grave at the Südfriedhof in Leipzig

Born in Diemarden near Göttingen, Schachtebeck attended the Höhere Bürgerschule in Göttingen and received his first violin lessons from Eduard Gustav Wolschke, the then chief conductor of the Göttinger Symphonie Orchester. He studied violin from 1904 to 1905 with Arno Hilf at the Leipzig Conservatory. Afterwards, he received private lessons from Walter Hansmann and took part in concerts with the Gewandhaus.

In 1908 he became violinist in the Gewandhausorchester. In 1909 he became first concertmaster at the Theater Leipzig. From 1911 to 1914 he was concertmaster of the Philharmonic Winderstein Orchestra. He was also repeatedly appointed to the Bayreuth Festival orchestra (1911/12, 1914, 1931, 1933/34). Schachtebeck played in different instrumentations in the Schachtebeck String quartet. He served as a soldier during the First World War.

From 1929 to 1936, Schachtebeck was a lecturer at the University of Leipzig, but was dismissed because of his marriage to the Odessa-born pianist and "Half-Jew", Augusta Schachtebeck-Sorocker († 1944). He also had to quit his position at the Theatre Altenburg-Gera which he could hold only with special permission, and so he was without a permanent employment from 1944.

In 1945 he became chief conductor of the Leipziger Sinfonie-Orchester. From 1946 to 1948 he was a violin teacher and acting director of the Academy of Music in Leipzig. From 1948 to 1954, he was professor at the University of Leipzig. He founded the department music education (today: Institute for Music Education) at the Faculty of Education. He had several performances with the Collegium musicum.

Schachtebeck became a member of the German Musicians' Association in 1933. He was a member of the Society for German-Soviet Friendship and the Cultural Association of the GDR. Since 1946 he was a member of the SED and since 1946 of the FDGB.
