= Felix Salmond =

English cellist and cello teacher (1888–1952)

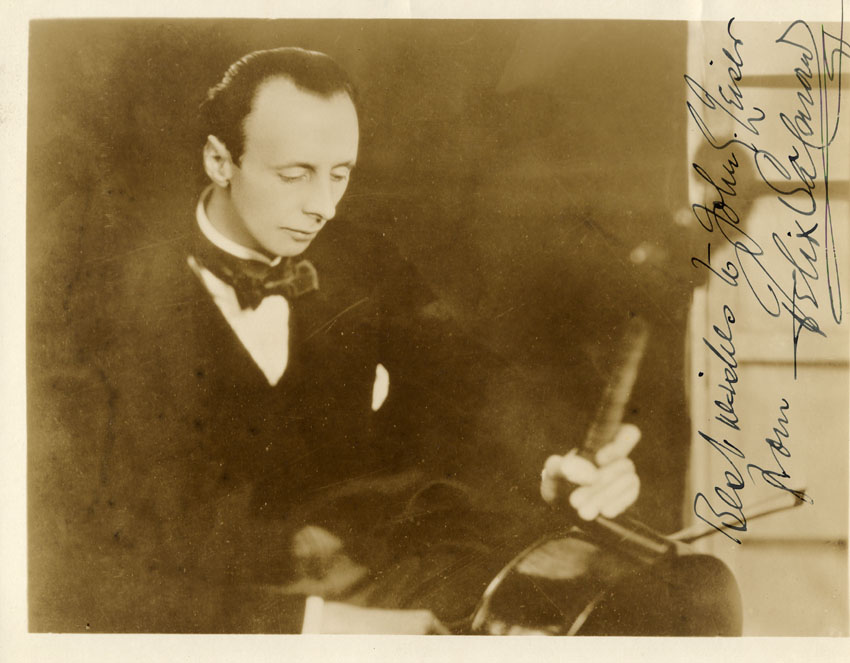
A signed photograph of Salmond with his cello, c. 1922

Felix Adrian Norman Salmond (19 November 1888 – 20 February 1952) was an English cellist and cello teacher who achieved success in the UK and the US.

== Early life and career ==
Salmond was born to a family of professional musicians. His father Norman Salmond was a baritone, and his mother Adelaide Manzocchi was a pianist who had studied with Clara Schumann. At age twelve, Salmond started studying with the man who became his primary cello teacher, William Whitehouse. He won a scholarship to continue studies with Whitehouse four years later at the Royal Academy of Music in London. He continued on to the Brussels Conservatoire at age nineteen, where he studied for two years with Édouard Jacobs. His concert debut was in 1908, playing Frank Bridge's Fantasy Trio in C minor and Johannes Brahms's Piano Quartet No. 1 in G minor. Salmond's mother was the pianist, with Bridge on viola and Maurice Sons playing the violin. The recital, which took place at the Bechstein Hall, was very successful, leading to many future engagements for Salmond. He gave recitals across Britain and appeared with the Queen's Hall Orchestra, the London Symphony Orchestra and the Hallé Orchestra, amongst others. He also toured America in a piano quartet with Harold Bauer, Bronisław Huberman and Lionel Tertis.

== Salmond and Elgar ==
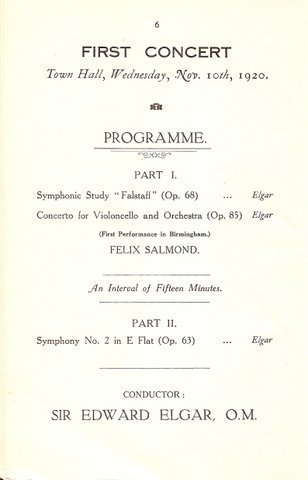
Programme for the CBSO's first formal concert, on 10 November 1920, with Salmond as the soloist and Elgar conducting

World War I prevented Salmond from developing his international career further at that time, but he resumed building a reputation in chamber music after the war. His performances in this period included the premieres, on 21 May 1919, of Edward Elgar's String Quartet in E minor and Piano Quintet in A minor at the Wigmore Hall (as the Bechstein Hall had now become).

After Salmond's performance of his quartet, Elgar entrusted Salmond with the solo part for the debut of his most personal and heartfelt work, his Cello Concerto in E minor with the London Symphony Orchestra at the Queen's Hall. The premiere, on 26 October 1919, proved to be a disaster. The performance was scheduled such that Albert Coates, the conductor of the London Symphony, would conduct the rest of the programme and Elgar himself would conduct the concerto. Coates, a self-important man, was well known for using up to forty-five minutes of his hour of rehearsal time lecturing his players. After Coates consumed an hour of Elgar's rehearsal time, Elgar—who was until that time waiting offstage for his chance to rehearse—uncharacteristically exploded with anger. The severely under-rehearsed performance which followed received scathing reviews, with Ernest Newman stating that "the orchestra made a public exhibition of its miserable self". Elgar later said that if it weren't for Salmond's diligent work in preparing the piece, he would have pulled it from the concert entirely.

On 10 November 1920, the inaugural concert of the City of Birmingham Orchestra (later the City of Birmingham Symphony Orchestra) was given at Birmingham Town Hall, with Elgar conducting a concert of his own works, including the first performance of his Cello Concerto in that city, with Salmond as the soloist.

== Career in America ==
On 29 March 1922, he made his American solo debut in New York at the Aeolian Hall. He settled in America, although he returned to England and Europe for tours. In 1923, he was appointed to the faculty at the Mannes School of Music. He was appointed to the Juilliard School's faculty in 1924, and became head of the cello faculty at the Curtis Institute of Music a year later—a position which he kept until 1942. However, still bruised by the experience of the first performance of the Elgar concerto, he did not teach it or play it outside England. He was highly regarded in America as a teacher, with pupils including Robert LaMarchina, Orlando Cole, Suzette Forgues Halasz, Tibor de Machula, Bernard Greenhouse, Leonard Rose, Daniel Saidenberg, and Alan Shulman. He also received great appreciation as a performer. In 1924, he appeared at Carnegie Hall in a well-reviewed piano trio with pianist Ignacy Jan Paderewski and violinist Efrem Zimbalist. He had a broad taste in music for the cello, including works by contemporary composers such as Samuel Barber, Ernest Bloch and George Enescu (premiering two of his pieces). He last returned to England in 1947; he died in New York.
