= William Whitehouse =

English cellist (1859 - 1935)

William Edward Whitehouse (20 May 1859 – 12 January 1935) was an English cellist.

== Career ==
He studied for one year with Alfredo Piatti, for whom he deputised (taking his place in concerts when called upon), and was his favourite pupil. He went on to teach at the Royal Academy of Music, Royal College of Music and King's College, Cambridge; his students included Felix Salmond and Beatrice Harrison, who both became closely associated with Edward Elgar. He played with violinist Joseph Joachim, and formed The London Trio with violinist Achille Simonetti and pianist Amina Goodwin. He edited Piatti's Caprices, with suggestions as to how his former teacher preferred them to be played.
