= Cello Concerto (Elgar) =

Musical work by Edward Elgar

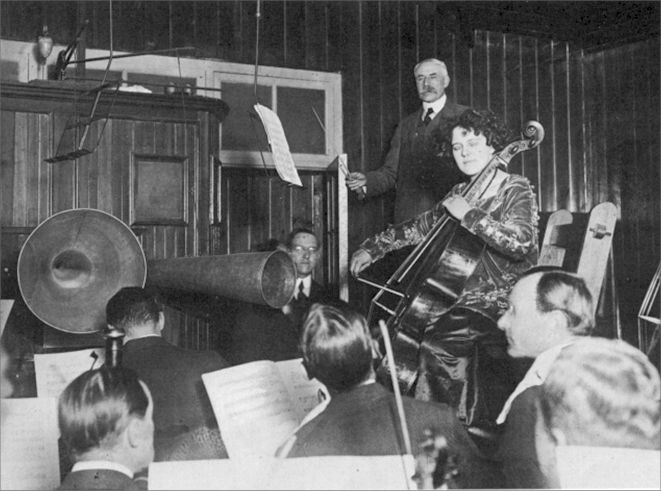
Elgar and Beatrice Harrison making the first (abridged) recording of the concerto (1920). Note the acoustic recording horns. Harrison would go on to make the first complete recording in 1928.

Edward Elgar's Cello Concerto in E minor, Op. 85, is a cornerstone of the solo cello repertoire. Elgar composed it in the aftermath of the First World War, when his music had already become out of fashion with the concert-going public. In contrast with Elgar's earlier Violin Concerto, which is lyrical and passionate, the Cello Concerto is for the most part contemplative and elegiac.

The October 1919 premiere was a debacle because Elgar and the performers had been deprived of adequate rehearsal time. Elgar made two recordings of the work with Beatrice Harrison as soloist. Since then, leading cellists from Pablo Casals onward have performed the work in concert and in the studio, but the work did not achieve wide popularity until the 1960s, when a recording by Jacqueline du Pré caught the public imagination and became a classical best-seller.

== History ==
Elgar is not known to have begun work on the concerto until 1919. In 1900 the cellist of the Brodsky Quartet, Carl Fuchs, had obtained the composer's agreement to write something for the cello one day. Fuchs and his friend the cellist Paul Grümmer later reminded Elgar of this. The composer's biographer Jerrold Northrop Moore speculates that Elgar may have recalled the promise when planning a new concerto in 1919.

In 1918 Elgar underwent an operation in London to have an infected tonsil removed. The night after his return from hospital to his London house he wrote down the melody that would become the first theme of the concerto. He and Alice, his wife (Lady Elgar), soon retired to their secluded country cottage "Brinkwells" near Fittleworth, Sussex. During 1918 Elgar composed three chamber works there (Note: The Violin Sonata in E minor, Op. 82; the String Quartet in E minor, Op. 83; and the Piano Quintet in A minor, Op. 84) which his wife commented were noticeably different in style and character from his previous compositions. After their premieres in the spring of 1919, he began realising his idea of a cello concerto. The work is dedicated to Sidney Colvin and his wife, who were his friends.

The concerto had a disastrous premiere, at the opening concert of the London Symphony Orchestra's 1919–20 season on 27 October 1919. Apart from the concerto, which the composer conducted, the rest of the programme was conducted by Albert Coates, who overran his rehearsal time at the expense of Elgar's. Lady Elgar wrote, "that brutal selfish ill-mannered bounder ... that brute Coates went on rehearsing." The critic of The Observer, Ernest Newman, wrote, "There have been rumours about during the week of inadequate rehearsal. Whatever the explanation, the sad fact remains that never, in all probability, has so great an orchestra made so lamentable an exhibition of itself. ... The work itself is lovely stuff, very simple – that pregnant simplicity that has come upon Elgar's music in the last couple of years – but with a profound wisdom and beauty underlying its simplicity." Elgar attached no blame to his soloist, Felix Salmond, who played for him again later. Elgar said that if it had not been for Salmond's diligent work in preparing the piece, he would have withdrawn it from the concert entirely.

In contrast with the First Symphony, which received a hundred performances worldwide in just over a year from its premiere, the Cello Concerto did not have a second performance in London for more than a year. Elgar's music was by this time widely seen as old-fashioned, less appropriate to the post-war era than to the Edwardian. The American premiere of the concerto was given in Carnegie Hall, New York on 21 November 1922 by Jean Gerardy with the Philadelphia Orchestra conducted by Leopold Stokowski. It was received with little enthusiasm: The New York Herald found most of the work "reflective, melancholy and generally depressing"; The New York Times thought the thematic material "is not rich; it is spun out, sometimes pretty thin". Gerardy later introduced the concerto in Poland and Australia. The Sydney Morning Herald found the work original, musicianly and an admirable addition to the cello repertoire, but "without the qualities that kindle the imagination of the listener".

Later the concerto gained greater appreciation. In 1955 the authors of The Record Guide wrote of "the irresistible appeal of the Cello Concerto", although "the task of interpreting the solo is extremely difficult", requiring "a reserved dignity that is peculiarly English". By 1967, according to the critic Edward Greenfield, Jacqueline du Pré was "convincing audiences from New York to Moscow that Elgar is – on occasion at least – exportable".

The work has become, along with Dvořák's Op. 104, one of the two most frequently performed cello concertos in the international repertoire.

== Music ==
This work is scored for solo cello, 2 flutes, 2 oboes, 2 clarinets in A, 2 bassoons, 4 horns in F, 2 trumpets in C, 3 trombones, tuba, timpani, and strings.

The work typically plays for a little under 30 minutes; (Note: Elgar's second recording with Harrison plays for 25m 11s; later recordings are generally slower: Tortelier (1954), du Pré (1965), Isserlis (1987) and Mørk (2009) range from 28m 33s to 30m.06s.) it has four movements:

1. Adagio – Moderato (approx. 8:00)
2. Lento – Allegro molto (approx. 4:30)
3. Adagio (approx. 4:50)
4. Allegro – Moderato – Allegro, ma non-troppo – Poco più lento – Adagio (approx. 11:30)

=== I. Adagio – Moderato ===
The first movement is in ternary form with an introduction. It opens with a recitative for the solo cello, immediately followed by a short answer from the clarinets, bassoons and horn.

An ad lib modified scale played by the solo cello follows. The viola section then presents a rendition of the main theme in Moderato, and passes it to the solo cello who repeats it. Elgar considered it to be his tune: "if you ever hear someone whistling this melody around the Malvern Hills, that will be me".

The string section plays the theme a third time and then the solo cello modifies it into a fortissimo restatement. The orchestra reiterates, and the cello presents the theme a final time before moving directly into a lyrical E major middle section.

This transitions into a similar repetition of the first section. This section omits the fortissimo modified theme in the solo cello. The slower first movement moves directly into the second movement.

=== II. Lento – Allegro molto ===
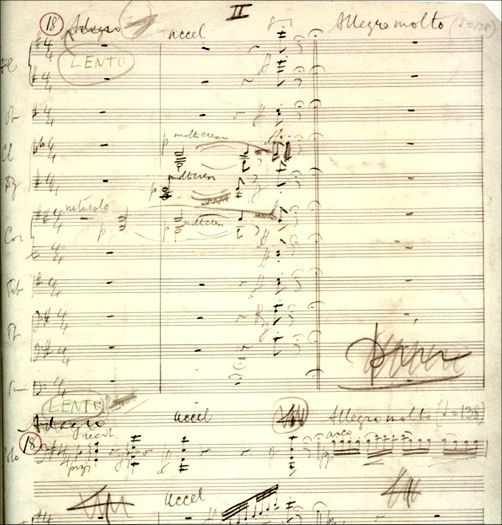
Fragment of the manuscript of the opening of the second movement of the concerto

The second movement opens with a fast crescendo with pizzicato chords in the cello. Then, the solo cello plays what will be the main motive of the Allegro molto section.

Pizzicato chords follow. A brief cadenza is played, and sixteenth-note motive and chords follow. A ritardando leads directly to a scherzo-like section which remains until the end.

=== III. Adagio ===
The slow third movement starts and ends with a lyrical melody, and one theme runs through the entire movement.

=== IV. Allegro – Moderato – Allegro, ma non-troppo – Poco più lento – Adagio ===
IV. Allegro
Performed by the Skidmore College Orchestra

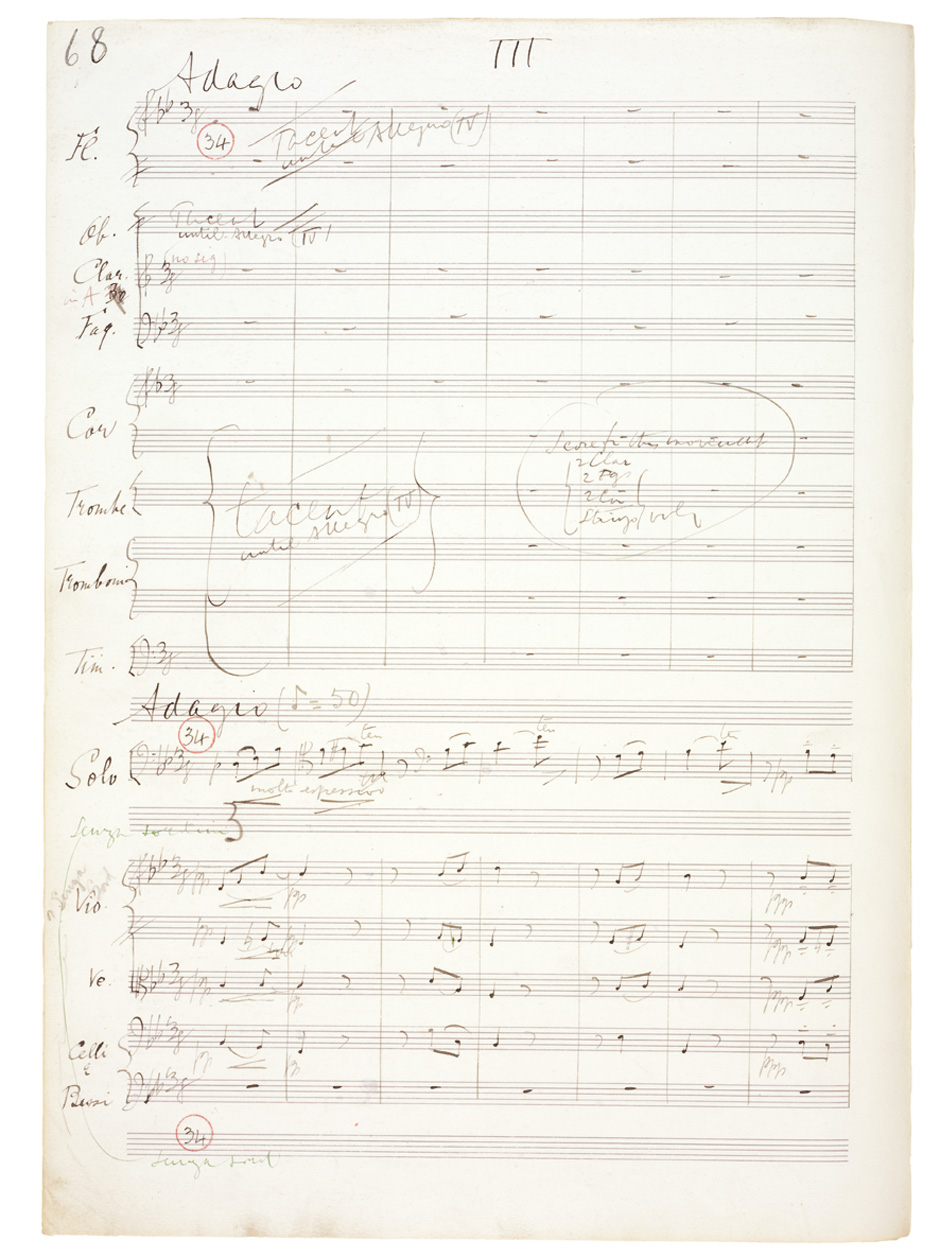
Autograph manuscript of the beginning of the third movement of the concerto

The fourth movement begins with another fast crescendo and ends at fortissimo. The solo cello follows with another recitative and cadenza. The movement's main theme is noble and stately, but with undertones and with many key-changes.

Near the end of the piece, the tempo slows into a più lento section, in which a new set of themes appears.

The tempo slows further, to the tempo of the third movement, and the theme from that movement is restated. This tempo continues to slow until it becomes stagnant, and the orchestra holds a chord. Then, at the very end of the piece, the recitative of the first movement is played again. This flows into a reiteration of the main theme of the fourth movement, with tension building until the final three chords, which close the piece.

== Recordings ==
Elgar and Beatrice Harrison made a truncated recording in 1920, using the acoustic recording process. (Note: The cuts reduced the playing time to 16m 02s.) The first complete recording was made in 1928, by Harrison, Elgar and the New Symphony Orchestra. There were later 78 rpm recordings with W. H. Squire and Pablo Casals as soloists, but the work was infrequently recorded until the LP era of the 1950s to the 1970s.

A key recording was made in 1965 by EMI, with British cellist Jacqueline du Pré as soloist and the London Symphony Orchestra conducted by Sir John Barbirolli. (Note: During a break in the recording session, the 20-year-old du Pré left the studio, returning to find a large audience of local musicians and critics who had heard that a star was in the making.) It was this recording that according to one critic "even persuaded the Americans to listen enraptured to Elgar". Since then there have been more than seventy recordings issued, with soloists including in the 1960s Pierre Fournier and Mstislav Rostropovich, in the 1970s Paul Tortelier, in the 1980s Lynn Harrell, Heinrich Schiff, Yo-Yo Ma and Steven Isserlis, in the 1990s Mischa Maisky, János Starker, Pieter Wispelwey and Truls Mørk, in the 2000s Anne Gastinel and Raphael Wallfisch, and later Sol Gabetta, Paul Watkins, Antonio Meneses and Sheku Kanneh-Mason.

In 1985 Julian Lloyd Webber recorded the concerto with the Royal Philharmonic Orchestra conducted by Yehudi Menuhin. For BBC Music Magazine Jerrold Northrop Moore chose this as the finest version to date and it won a Brit Award for "Best Classical Recording" of 1985. The BBC Radio 3 feature "Building a Library" has presented comparative reviews of all available versions of the concerto on three occasions. The Penguin Guide to Recorded Classical Music, 2008, has three pages of reviews of the work. The only recording to receive the top recommendation of both the BBC and The Penguin Guide is du Pré's 1965 recording with the LSO and Barbirolli. Other recordings commended by both the BBC and The Penguin Guide are by Beatrice Harrison (1928); Stephen Isserlis (1988); Yo-Yo Ma (1985) and Truls Mørk (1999).

The German periodical Fono Forum in a 2022 discographic survey of the work recommends recordings featuring as soloists Harrison, du Pré, Tortelier, Robert Cohen, Michaela Fukačová, Daniel Müller-Schott and Watkins.

== Notes, references and sources ==
=== Sources ===
- Anderson, Robert (1993). Elgar. London: J. M. Dent. ISBN 978-0-46-086054-3.
- Clough, Francis F.; G. G. Cuming (1952). World's Encyclopedia of Recorded Music. London: Sidgwick and Jackson. OCLC 847382507.
- Lebrecht, Norman (2007). The Life and Death of Classical Music. New York: Anchor Books. ISBN 978-1-4000-9658-9.
- March, Ivan, ed. (1967). The Great Records. Blackpool: Long Playing Record Library. OCLC 555041974.
- March, Ivan, ed. (1977) [1975]. The Penguin Stereo Record Guide (second ed.). London: Penguin Books. ISBN 978-0-14-046223-4.
- March, Ivan, ed. (2007). The Penguin Guide to Recorded Classical Music. London: Penguin Books. ISBN 978-0-14-103336-5.
- Moore, Jerrold Northrop (1999). Elgar – A Creative Life. Oxford University Press. ISBN 9780198163664.
- Reed, W. H. (1946). Elgar. London: Dent. OCLC 8858707.
- Sackville-West, Edward; Desmond Shawe-Taylor (1955). The Record Guide. London: Collins. OCLC 500373060.
- Steinberg, Michael (1998). The Concerto: A Listener's Guide. Oxford: Oxford University Press. ISBN 978-0-19-510330-4.
