= Piano Quartet (Strauss) =

Piano Quartet in C minor
- Piano quartet by Richard Strauss
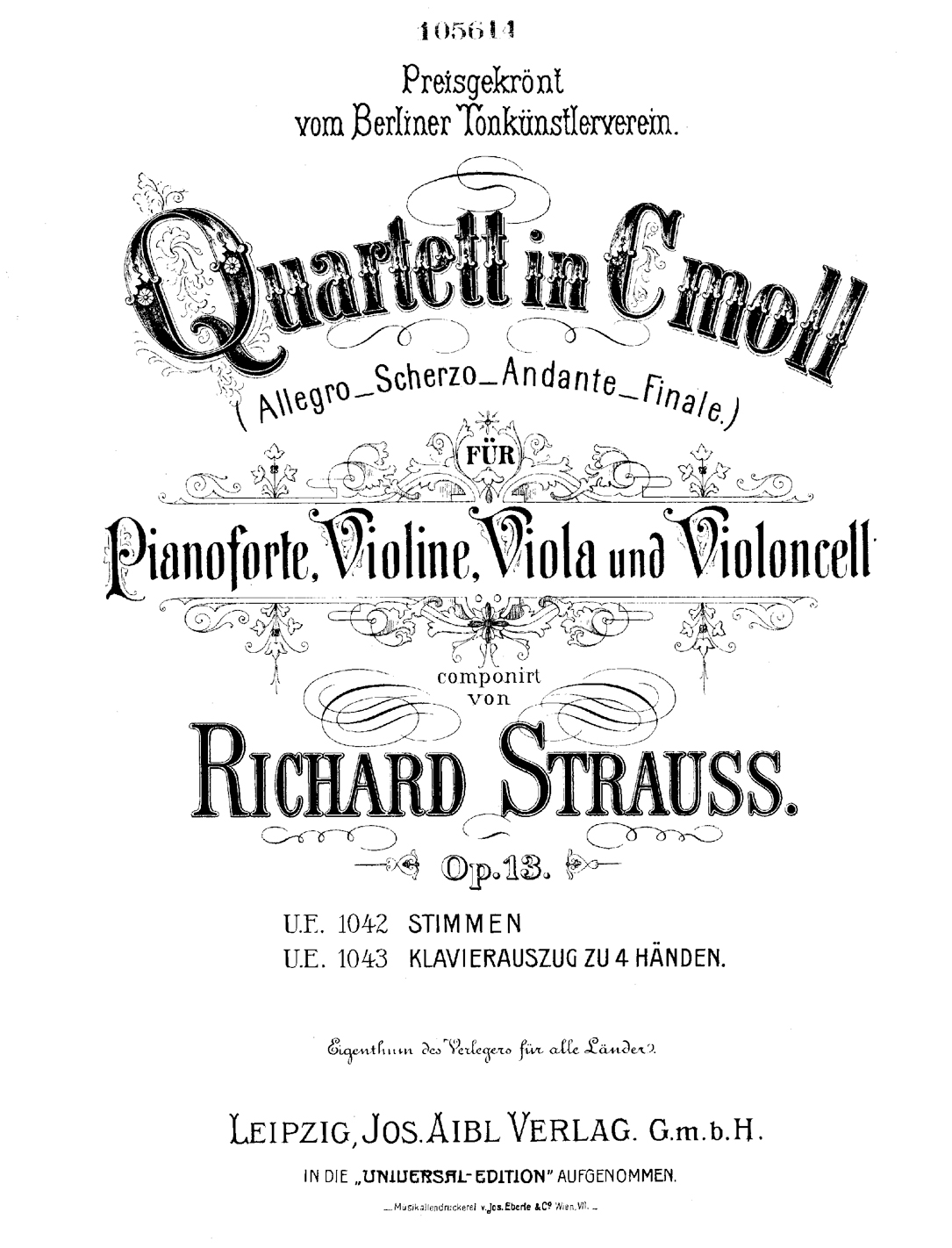
- Cover page of first edition
- Key: C minor
- Catalogue: TrV 137
- Opus: 13
- Composed: 1884–1885
- Dedication: Georg II, Duke of Saxe-Meiningen
- Published: 1886
- Duration: 37–40 minutes
- Movements: four
- Scoring: piano; violin; viola; cello

Premiere
- Date: 8 December 1885
- Location: Weimar
- Performers: Richard Strauss (piano); Karel Halíř (violin); Hagel (viola); Leopold Grützmacher (cello)

The Piano Quartet in C minor, Op. 13, TrV 137, was written by Richard Strauss from 1884 to 1885. An early chamber music work of the then 20-year-old composer, it shows considerable influence from Johannes Brahms. It is scored for a standard piano quartet consisting of a piano, violin, viola, and cello. At the premiere on 8 December 1885 in Weimar, Strauss himself performed the piano part.

The work consists of four movements, with a total playing time of 37 to 40 minutes. The first movement is in sonata form with many sharp contrasts and a constantly switching mood. The second movement is a light and playful scherzo dominated by a leaping motif. The third movement is lyrical and reflective, while the finale revisits the turbulent mood of the opening movement.

The work was favorably received by the press and public. Strauss submitted it to a competition of the Berliner Tonkünstlerverein and was awarded the first prize out of 24 entries. Though the Piano Quartet ultimately never rivalled the success of his other early chamber pieces, Strauss cherished the piece and programmed it regularly until the 1920s.

== Background ==
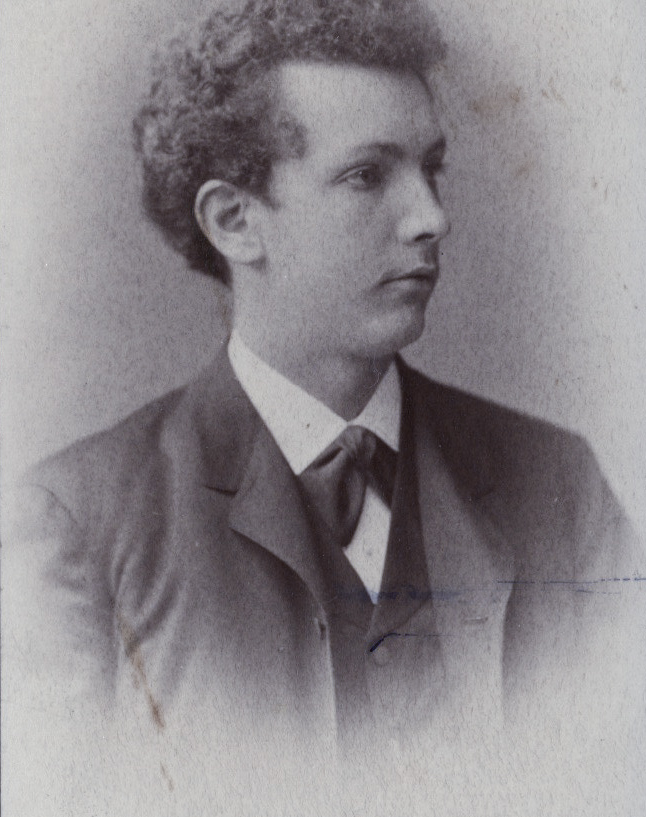
Strauss in 1886

The Piano Quartet in C minor was written in the fall and winter of 1884–85, bearing an autograph date of 1 January 1885. This early chamber music work, written when Strauss was 20 years old, shows considerable influence from Johannes Brahms, especially his Piano Quartet in G minor (1856–1861) and Piano Quartet in C minor (1875). When Strauss later spoke in retrospect about his Brahmsschwärmerei ("infatuation with Brahms") period, he explicitly mentioned Wandrers Sturmlied (1884) and Burleske (1885–1886), but not the Piano Quartet, which according to his biographer Richard Specht was the "strongest acknowledgment of Brahms that Strauss ever made". Musicologist Peter Jost suggests that Strauss was rather embarrassed by its stylistic similarity to Brahms' works in his later years.

A few weeks after the work's completion, the Berliner Tonkünstlerverein, a Berlin-based professional association for musicians, held a competition for "the best piano quartet received", with Heinrich Dorn, Josef Rheinberger and Franz Wüllner as judges. Motivated by the failure of his Cello Sonata at a similar competition three years earlier, Strauss submitted his Piano Quartet and was awarded the first prize out of 24 submissions, receiving a prize of 300 marks.

The premiere of the Piano Quartet took place in Weimar on 8 December 1885, with the composer playing the piano part. In a letter to his father, Strauss mentioned the other three performers as "Grützmacher, Halir and Hagel", presumably Leopold Grützmacher (cello), Karel Halíř (violin) and an otherwise unknown violist with the name Hagel. (Note: The performers of the premiere are sometimes incorrectly given as "members of the Halir Quartet", which was founded a decade later in Berlin.) Strauss described the premiere as being very successful.

The first edition appeared in July 1886; Strauss received a payment of 200 marks from his publisher Eugen Spitzweg, owner of the Aibl Publishing House in Munich. The work bears a dedication to Georg II, Duke of Saxe-Meiningen; as Court Kapellmeister in Meiningen, Strauss was eager to win the trust of the duke. After Strauss resigned to take up a position in Munich, the duke afforded his thanks to the dedication in a letter to Strauss: "The dedication of your inventive, beautiful quartet will afford me great pleasure. On this occasion, I would like to tell you that I am very sad to see you leave and confess that through your achievements I am thoroughly cured of my earlier misapprehension that you, due to your youth, were not yet qualified to be the sole director of an orchestra."

== Structure ==
External audio
- Performed by the Ames Piano Quartet
- I. Allegro
- II. Scherzo: Presto
- III. Andante
- IV. Finale: Vivace

The Piano Quartet consists of four movements, with a total duration of 37 to 40 minutes.

1. Allegro
2. Scherzo: Presto
3. Andante
4. Finale: Vivace

=== I. Allegro ===

The first movement is held in sonata form and opens with a low-lying unisono subject in the strings that pauses on a chord and subsequently erupts fortissimo in triplets on the piano. A similar series of musical devices is used in Brahms' G minor and C minor piano quartet. According to musicologist Ludwig Finscher, the opening movement is not based concise motifs, but on expansive thematic groups. While the first theme group is "richly Brahmsian", the second is "one of the first great Strauss cantilenas, a huge melody of pathos-saturated gestures". The development already shows Strauss in his "insatiable" manner of motif processing.

Music critic Michael Kennedy noted that "one should recognize the real Strauss in the broad sweep of the second subject of the first movement and in the Till-like way in which he switches moods during this Allegro".

=== II. Scherzo. Presto ===

The second movement is a skittish scherzo, dominated by a leaping motif that appears in various variations. Marked presto, it is full of energy, with octave drops throughout. Echoes of the Burleske for piano and orchestra, composed in 1886, can be heard. In contrast, the trio section is romantic and lyrical in which the instruments take turns. The trio section is recalled in the coda.

=== III. Andante ===

The third movement is an reflective Andante in F minor. A gentle introduction in the strings leads to a long, elegiac piano theme that the strings tentatively take up. A lyrical second subject is taken up by the viola, and Strauss develops both themes gracefully. A little triplet figure foreshadows Ariadne auf Naxos, composed almost 30 years later.

=== IV. Finale. Vivace ===

The finale returns to the turbulent mood of the opening movement, a "rugged piece consisting almost entirely of motivic gestures". The first theme is full of "sharp edges" and syncopated rhythms, but once again the mood shifts when the calm second theme (molto con espressione) is introduced in the cello. Both ideas are extensively developed, leading to a conclusion on a C minor chord.

Kennedy notes that the movement sounds more like Schumann than Brahms, though it also foreshadows the mature Strauss in some of the figures.

== Reception and legacy ==
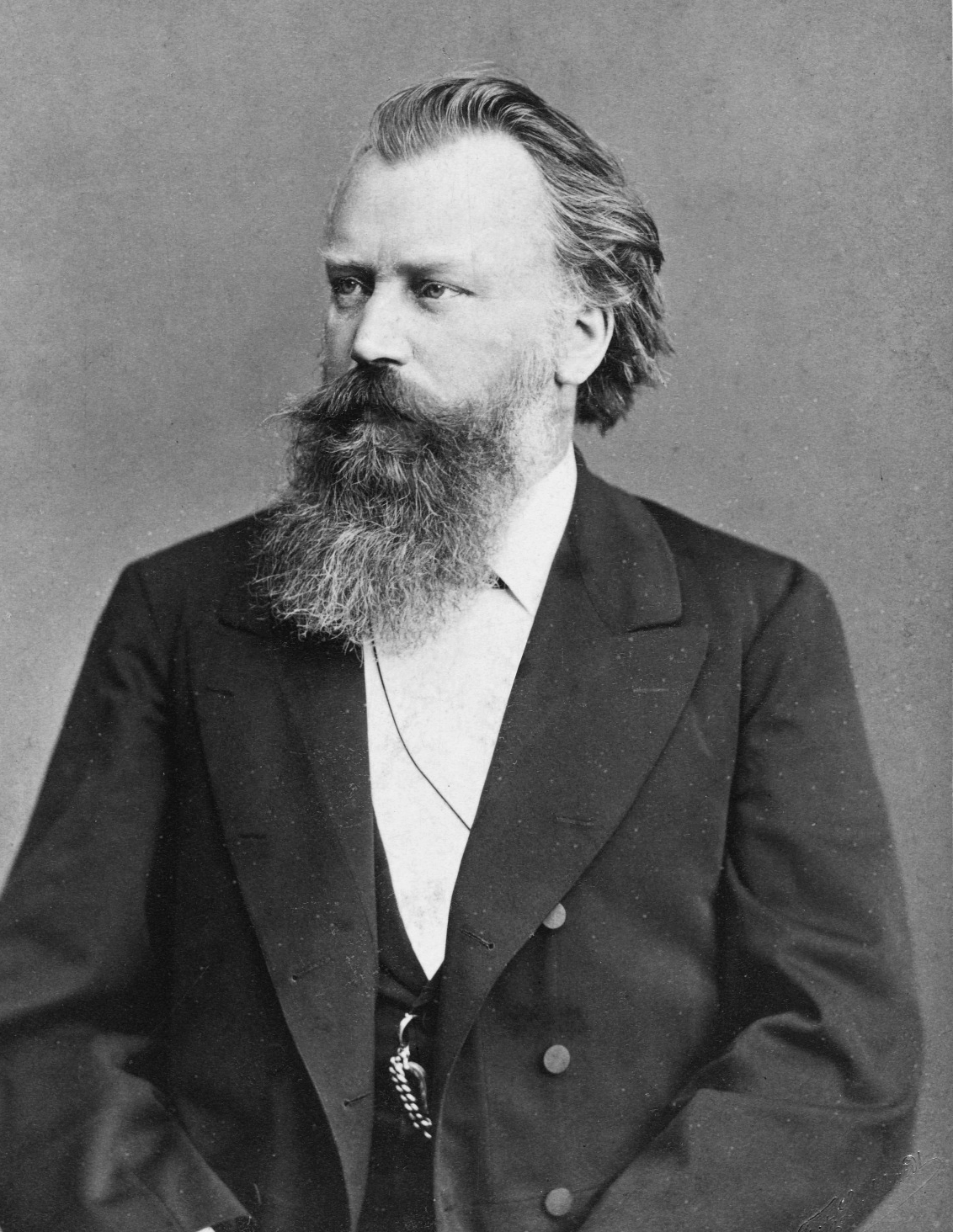
Johannes Brahms c. 1885

Although the premiere was successful and the work won Strauss a prestigious competition, his Piano Quartet did not receive much coverage in the press, perhaps due to an abundance of works in the genre and the dominance of Brahms' piano quartets. Strauss himself seemed to have been surprised that the Piano Quartet was enthusiastically received by the public – in a letter to his mentor Hans von Bülow, Strauss called his own work "by no means a pleasant and flattering piece".

Following a performance in Berlin on 22 May 1886 at a soiree of the Tonkünstlerverein, the Vossische Zeitung wrote:

[Richard Strauss'] new work testifies to aesthetic sense, inventiveness and technical skill. Just as the composer keeps within the bounds of a healthy sensibility here, he also develops his themes in a clear and mostly lively, as well as artistic manner. Only the first Allegro and the Scherzo of the quartet seem to be the most peculiar in substance, the latter especially with its rhythms. The Andante initially captivates with its soft and full swelling cantilena, but becomes tiring in the course due to the lack of a more lively contrast. The finale is fresh and brisk; in keeping with the basic character of the work, we would have liked a grander conception of this movement. The arrangement of the instruments, especially the strings, is as melodious as it is often characteristically charming.

The work was performed in Cologne in 1887 at the annual festival of the Allgemeiner Deutscher Musikverein. Music critic Richard Pohl complimented Strauss, despite being a follower of the New German School around Franz Liszt and thus critical towards chamber music in the style of Brahms:

Richard Strauss has an unusual talent for composition – he has his own thoughts, imaginative ideas, great formal dexterity and a 'long breath', a proof of proficient skill. The Quartet lasts three quarters of an hour and yet kept us in suspense until the end. The last movement, however, is the weakest – but that happens to most composers, as it is much harder to satisfactorily conclude than to begin. Dramatists usually do not fare any better with their final acts. The first movement is large in scale and broad in development; the Scherzo has real humor, but is so exceptionally difficult rhythmically that, as one kind artist told me, "you must be able to keep time very well just to listen to it". The Andante is noble and flows beautifully.

Music critic Arthur Johnstone wrote in 1904 that Strauss "shows himself a better Brahmsian than Brahms, avoiding all his model's worst faults" and that the quartet "might rank as the mature work of anyone but Strauss". He called it an "extremely good Quartet of the orthodox kind — one may even say, one of the best existing works for pianoforte and three bow instruments".

Though the Piano Quartet never rivalled the success of the Cello Sonata (1883) or the Violin Sonata (1887), Strauss cherished the piece and programmed it regularly until the 1920s; by then, he had already established a reputation for large-scale stage works and orchestral pieces. The Violin Sonata of 1887 remained his last major chamber music work, and the Piano Quartet "represents one of the last moments of Strauss' youthful apprenticeship before he discovered the path to his own musical independence".

== Recordings ==
As of 2022, recordings of the Piano Quartet include:

Recordings of the Piano Quartet in C minor
| Year | Performers | Label | Catalogue | Duration |
|---|---|---|---|---|
| 1993 | Ames Piano Quartet | Dorian | 90167 | 38:35 |
| 1994 | Ralf Gothoni, Mark Lubotsky, Martti Rousi, Matti Hirvikangas | Ondine | ODE840-2 | 39:46 |
| 1997 | Christiaan Bor, Rainer Moog, Ronald Thomas, Pascal Devoyon | Vanguard | 99156 | 36:41 |
| 1999 | Peter Wöpke, Roland Metzger, Ingo Sinnhoffer, Wolfgang Sawallisch | Arts Music | 472592 | 38:45 |
| 2000 | Lyric Piano Quartet | Black Box | BBM1048 | 37:53 |
| 2005 | Mendelssohn Piano Trio, Michael Stepniak | Centaur | CRC2718 | 34:03 |
| 2006 | Mozart Piano Quartet | MDG | MDG6431355 | 39:00 |
| 2006 | Alvarez Quartet | HERA | HER2121 | 38:22 |
| 2007 | Nash Ensemble | Hyperion | CDA67574 | 40:30 |
| 2010 | Primrose Piano Quartet | Meridian | CDE84584/5 | 38:25 |
| 2014 | Fauré Quartet | Sony | 88843023672 | 37:05 |
| 2016 | Doren Dinglinger, Tony Nys, Alexandre Vay, Daniel Blumenthal | CPO | 5551162 | 40:22 |
| 2017 | Canada Quartet | Centaur | CRC3384 | 40:50 |
| 2018 | Munich Piano Trio, Tilo Widenmeyer | Genuin | GEN18496 | 37:29 |
