= Violin Sonata (Elgar) =

Composition for violin and piano by Edward Elgar

Edward Elgar, aged about 60

Sir Edward Elgar wrote his Violin Sonata in E minor, Op. 82, in 1918, at the same time as he wrote his String Quartet in E minor and his Piano Quintet in A minor. These three chamber music works were all written at "Brinkwells", the country house near Fittleworth in West Sussex that Lady Elgar had acquired for her husband to recuperate and compose in, and they mark his major contribution to the chamber music genre. His Cello Concerto in E minor of 1919 completed the quartet of introspective and melancholy works that comprised Elgar's last major creative spurt before his death in 1934.

The violin sonata is scored for the usual combination of violin and piano, and has three movements:

1. Allegro
2. Romance: Andante
3. Allegro non troppo

Elgar's wife noted that the slow movement seemed to be influenced by the 'wood magic' or genii loci of the Fittleworth woods.

When the sonata was close to completion, Elgar offered to dedicate it to a family friend, Marie Joshua, and wrote to her: "I fear it does not carry us any further but it is full of golden sounds and I like it, but you must not expect anything violently chromatic or cubist". Marie Joshua died four days after receiving the letter, before she had had an opportunity to reply. As a tribute to her memory, Elgar quoted the dolcissimo melody from the slow movement just before the coda of the final movement.

The Violin Sonata in E minor was completed on 15 September 1918, and first performed on 13 March 1919 at a semi-public meeting of the British Music Society by Elgar's friend W. H. Reed with Anthony Bernard on piano. With Elgar present, it received its first public performance on 21 March 1919 in Aeolian Hall, with Reed and Landon Ronald. Albert Sammons and William Murdoch were the sonata's greatest champions in the early years, and they made a recording on 2 February 1935. (It was also Sammons who made the first complete recording of Elgar's Violin Concerto in B minor.) Earlier, in 1919, a recording was made by Marjorie Hayward and Una Bourne.

The Violin Sonata has never had a reputation as one of Elgar's great works, and it features irregularly on concert programs. In recent years, however, it has been recorded a number of times, and there are now over 20 recordings in the catalogue. Those who have recorded it include Hugh Bean, Yehudi Menuhin, Max Rostal, Lydia Mordkovitch, Nigel Kennedy, Midori, Maxim Vengerov, Tasmin Little, Jonathan Crow, Daniel Hope and Jennifer Pike.

It was also included in the soundtrack of the anime Nodame Cantabile.
