= Amina Goodwin =

English pianist and music educator (1867 – 1942)

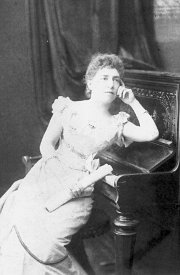
Amina Goodwin circa 1900.

Amina Goodwin (1867 – 1942) was an English pianist, composer, and music educator who founded the London Trio.

== Early life and training ==
The daughter of John Lawrence Goodwin, a Manchester organist and violinist, she began performing at the age of six, but received mixed reception as to her 'child prodigy' status at least until the age of fourteen.

She studied at the Leipzig Conservatory for four years from the age of eleven, followed by the Paris Conservatory under Élie-Miriam Delaborde for two years. On the guarantee of Camille Saint-Saëns, she became a pupil of Franz Liszt and of Clara Schumann.

== Teaching and writing ==
On her return to England, she performed at the Crystal Palace Saturday concerts and toured Europe as a piano soloist. She had established herself as a piano teacher in London by 1898.

Her compositions for piano included an intermezzo, toccata, gavotte and study.

She wrote the instructional Practical Hints on the Technique and Touch of Piano Playing as well as several articles on technique in the Etude magazine and contributions to Cobbett’s Cyclopedia.

== London Trio ==
In 1889 she formed the London Trio with William Whitehouse and a Mr Werner, who was later replaced on violin by Achille Simonetti and then Louis Pécskai. It was credited with being the first classical trio in England, and was a staple of the London music scene for many years.

== Personal life ==
She married an American husband, W. Ingram-Adams, but continued performing as 'Madame Amina Goodwin.'
