= Achille Simonetti =

Italian violinist and composer (1857 - 1928)

- Born: 12 June 1857; Turin
- Died: 19 November 1928 (aged 71) London
- Genres: Classical
- Occupations: Violinist and composer
- Instrument: Violin
- Years active: Circa 1880–1928

Achille Simonetti (12 June 1857 – 19 November 1928) was a prominent Italian violinist and composer, mainly resident in England and Ireland. He was mainly known as a chamber musician and teacher.

== Life ==
Born in Turin on 12 June 1857, Simonetti left his family in Bologna (this can be gleaned from his letter to Mr Hill (of Hills and Sons) written in 1922,) and completed his studies under Francesco Bianchi, Eugenio Cavallini, Giuseppe Gamba, Charles Dancla (regarded as the last exponent of the classical French school of violin playing), and Camillo Sivori, the last pupil of Niccolo Paganini.

Simonetti died aged 71 in London on 19 November 1928.

== Career ==
Simonetti came to England in 1891, embarking on a career as chamber musician. He became part of the first London Trio, an endeavour which occupied him from 1901 to 1912, along with cellist William Whitehouse and pianist Amina Goodwin.

From 1912 to 1919, he was a professor of violin at the Royal Irish Academy of Music, and served as a teacher for many distinguished violinists, including Walter Starkie.

Simonetti was also an early champion of the Brahms Violin Concerto, and wrote a cadenza for the work.

== Selected compositions ==
Orchestral

- Ronde joyeuse for string orchestra
- Sérénade for string orchestra
- Meditazione for small orchestra

Chamber music

- Allegretto Romantico in D minor for viola and piano (published 1897)
- Andante mélancolique for violin (or cello) and piano
- Ballata in C minor for viola and piano (published 1897)
- Berceuse for violin and piano
- Canzonetta for violin and piano
- Capriccio for violin and piano
- Cavatina for cello and piano
- Elegia for cello and piano
- Furlana, Italian Dance for violin and piano
- Madrigale in D major for violin and piano (1901) - wrote text and music? - (Different?) music has been set to this by Pietro Floridia.
- Mazurka for violin and piano
- Minuetto for violin and piano
- Notturnino for violin and piano
- Rêverie for violin and piano
- Romanza for violin and piano
- Romanzetta for violin and piano
- Sonata No. 2, Op. 9, for violin and piano in C major (published 1894)
- Scènes montagnardes, Op. 12, for violin and piano
- String Quartet No. 1 in D minor, Op. 14 (published 1904)
- String Quartet No. 2 in B flat major, Op. 16 (published c.1904)

Piano

- Caprice-Mazurka for piano
- Trois Morceaux caractéristiques (3 Character Pieces) for piano
