= Philip Eustace Stretton =

English painter

Philip Eustace Stretton (1865–1919) was a British animal and sporting painter working between 1882 until his death.

Stretton painted in oils and watercolour and exhibited at the Royal Academy between 1884 and 1904. Stretton was a follower of Sir Edwin Landseer, whose animal paintings had an enormous impact on Stretton.
