= Ottokar Nováček =

Czech composer and violist (1866–1900)

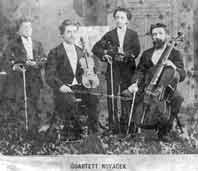
Ottokar Nováček (second from left)

Ottokar Eugen Nováček (13 May 1866 – 3 February 1900) was an Austro-Hungarian violinist, violist and composer of Czech descent. He is perhaps best known for his work Perpetuum Mobile (Perpetual Motion), written in 1895.

== Life ==
Nováček was born at Weißkirchen (Hungarian: Fehértemplom, Serbian: Bela Crkva / Бела Црква), southern Austrian Empire (today Serbia). He studied successfully with his father Martin Joseph Nováček, with Jakob Dont in Vienna (1880–83), and with Henry Schradieck and Brodsky at the Leipzig Conservatory, where he won the Mendelssohn Prize in 1885. He played in the Leipzig Gewandhaus Orchestra and in the Brodsky Quartet, originally as second violin and later as viola. He subsequently immigrated to the United States, where he was a member of the Boston Symphony Orchestra under Arthur Nikisch (1891) and was appointed principal viola in the Damrosch Orchestra, New York (1892–93). He also played in the re-formed Brodsky Quartet.

In 1899, after a heart condition forced him to retire from playing, he devoted himself to composition. His works include a piano concerto (1894, dedicated to, and first performed by, Ferruccio Busoni), Perpetuum mobile (Perpetual Motion) for violin and orchestra (1895), three string quartets (published in 1890, 1898 and 1904), eight Concerto caprices and other works for violin and piano, and six songs to texts by Leo Tolstoy. He died in New York City in 1900.

== Family lineage ==
- Martin (Joseph) Nováček (1834, Horaschdowitz, Royal Bohemia, Imp.-R. Austria–1906, Temesvár, Hungary)
  ∞ Maria Hildebrand
  - Rudolf Nováček (7 April 1860, Fehértemplom – 12 August 1929, Prague), a Militärkapellmeister and composer
  - Ottokar Nováček
  - Karl / Karel Nováček (1868, Fehértemplom – 1929, Budapest)
  - Victor Nováček (1875, Temesvár – 1914, Helsinki)
