= Diemarden =

Village in Germany

Coordinates: 51°29′N 9°59′E

Diemarden is a village in Gleichen in the Göttingen district of Lower Saxony, Germany. It had 1463 inhabitants as of 2005 and is the second largest village in Gleichen. In 2010, there were 1398 residents. The village's elevation is 172 meters above mean sea level. The village lies along the Garte stream, a tributary to the Leine river.

== History ==
The earliest record of Diemard is in 1022, when it is mentioned in the records of the St. Michaelis monastery in Hildesheim, which listed the manor and church as the monastery's property. In 1234 both manor and church were sold to the Hilwartshausen monastery. In 1272 the church was listed as having its own priest. The Vogtding served as court, later becoming monastery court. In the sixteenth century there was also a civil court, called Meierding.

In 1409 a watch tower was built as part of a series of eleven such towers that were part of a defensive and early-warning system for the city of Göttingen.

In 1993 a large windmill on a hill near Diemarden began generating electricity. Within two years, a second, more powerful windmill was added. These windmills and the watch tower can be seen from afar, marking the location of the low-lying village.

== Geography ==
The village lies in a valley surrounded by farmland, though with woods to the north and southwest. Through the valley flows the Garte stream. There are several plant species that grow wild in the greater village. These include early purple orchid and Gagea pratensis.

== Government ==
- Mayor: Gerold Kunz

== Sources ==
- Daldorf, Werner "Geschichte der Windkraft Diemarden Gmbh," www.windkraft-diemarden.de/history
- "Das Bietet Diemarden," www.gleichen.de/diemarden/home.htm
