= Arno Hilf =

German violinist

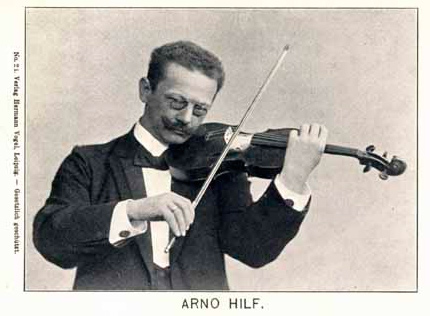
Arno Hilf, circa 1900

Franz Arno Hilf (14 March 1858 – 2 August 1909) was a German violin virtuoso. Among others, he was Konzertmeister of the Leipzig Gewandhaus Orchestra and primarius of the Gewandhaus Quartet.

== Life ==
Hilf came from a family of musicians. He was born in 1858 as the son of a musician in Bad Elster. His brother Robert Hilf (1859-1911), his uncles Christian Adam Arno Hilf and Christoph Wolfgang Hilf and his cousins Oskar Korndörfer and Ernst Korndörfer were also musicians and all played in the Gewandhaus Orchestra.

He received violin lessons from his uncle Christian Adam Arno Hilf and piano lessons from his father. At Leipzig Conservatory he studied from 1872 to 1876 with Ferdinand David, Engelbert Röntgen and Henry Schradieck.

From 1878 to 1888 he was second concertmaster at the Bolshoi Theater and teacher at the Moscow Conservatory. From 1878 to 1885 he was second violinist in the quartet of the Russian Music Society and from 1880 until 1915 in the Hřímalý Quartett in Moscow. (Quellenkataloge zur Musikgeschichte. Vol. 40). Noetzel, Wilhelmshaven 2007, ISBN 978-3-7959-0780-8, p. 128.

He then returned to Germany and became concertmaster of the Loh-Orchester Sondershausen in Sondershausen and teacher at the local conservatory. From 1889 to 1891 he was concertmaster of the Leipzig Gewandhaus Orchestra and at the same time Primarius (Quellenkataloge zur Musikgeschichte. Vol. 40). Noetzel, Wilhelmshaven 2007, ISBN 978-3-7959-0780-8, p. 113 of the Gewandhaus Quartet. He was also first violin teacher at the Leipzig Conservatory from 1892.

Among his students were Walter Bach, Clemens Meyer, Gabriel del Orbe, Heinrich Schachtebeck, Gustav Schmidt and Hans Stieber.

== Literature ==
- Alberto Bachmann: An Encyclopedia of the Violin. Dover Publications, Mineola 2008, ISBN 978-0-486-46618-7, p. 364.
- Albin Buchholz, Marion Schulz: Arno Hilf – Violinvirtuose, Lehrer, Komponist. (Schriften des Neuberin-Museums. 38). Neuberin-Museum Reichenbach, Reichenbach im Vogtland 2018, ISBN 978-3-932626-38-8.
- Hans-Rainer Jung, Claudius Böhm: Das Gewandhaus-Orchester. Seine Mitglieder und seine Geschichte seit 1743. Faber and Faber, Leipzig 2006, ISBN 3-936618-86-0, p. 167.
- Hilf. In: Meyers Großes Konversations-Lexikon. 6th edition. Vol. 9, Bibliographisches Institut, Leipzig/Vienna 1907, p. 330.
