= String Quartet (Elgar) =

Edward Elgar, aged about 60

The String Quartet in E minor, Op. 83, was one of three major chamber music works composed by Sir Edward Elgar in 1918. The others were the Violin Sonata in E minor, Op. 82, and the Piano Quintet in A minor, Op. 84. Along with the Cello Concerto in E minor, Op. 85 of 1919, these were to be his last major completed works prior to his death in 1934.

== Structure ==
The String Quartet lasts for around 25 minutes and is in three movements:

1. Allegro moderato, 12/8
2. Piacevole (poco andante), 3/8
3. Allegro molto, 4/4

=== II. Piacevole (poco andante) ===
The slow middle movement was a favourite of Elgar's wife Lady Elgar, who described it as "captured sunshine". It was played at her funeral in 1920, by Albert Sammons, W. H Reed, Lionel Tertis and Felix Salmond. It contains a quotation from Elgar's Chanson de Matin.

When he visited the composer during his final illness and after having listened to a gramophone recording of the second movement, Arthur Troyte Griffith remarked: ″Surely that is as fine as a movement by Beethoven.″ Elgar agreed: ″Yes it is, and there is something in it that has never been done before.″ When asked what he meant, Elgar merely replied: ″Nothing you would understand, merely an arrangement of notes". Brian Newbould has proposed that Elgar may have hinted at a shortened restatement of the opening theme before the coda. Presumably after the completion of the movement, he crossed the fourth bar (between bb. 263 and 264) through, but was still able to retain the original harmonisation.

== Background ==
Elgar had written a string quartet much earlier in his career, to which he assigned the opus number 8, but destroyed it. He made several other attempts, which all came to nothing. For example, he put aside work on a quartet to work on his First Symphony.

This quartet originated from a request by Carl Fuchs, cellist of the Brodsky Quartet and professor at the Royal Manchester College of Music. In February 1900, Elgar and his wife attended a performance of his Enigma Variations in Manchester, conducted by Hans Richter. At supper after the concert Richter introduced Elgar to Adolph Brodsky and his wife, and to Carl Fuchs. Fuchs then asked Elgar to compose a quartet for them.

In 1917, Elgar was ill and depressed by war-time London. He began work on the String Quartet on 25 March 1918, while recovering at home at Severn House after having his tonsils removed. He finished only the first subject of the first movement at that time. In May, Lady Elgar found "Brinkwells", a cottage surrounded by woods near Fittleworth in Sussex, in which he could work in seclusion away from the cares of the world. Now he turned his focus to the Violin Sonata in E minor, completing it on 15 September. He then immediately set to work on the Piano Quintet in A minor. He interrupted work on that piece on 8 October to return to the Quartet; he completed the middle movement on 26 November, and the final movement on 24 December. He completed the Piano Quintet in January 1919. The Quartet was first performed privately at Elgar's London home Severn House in January 1919, with George Bernard Shaw present, among others. Another private performance was given at the London home of his friend Frank Schuster on 26 April 1919.

Elgar was assisted in the violin writing, as he had been in the writing of the Violin Concerto in B minor in 1909–10, by his great friend W. H. Reed, who also led the quartet in the first private play-throughs.

== Premiere ==
The String Quartet in E minor was dedicated to the Brodsky Quartet, led by Adolph Brodsky, in honour of the promise Elgar had made years earlier to write a work for them. However, the members of the Brodsky Quartet were now around 70 years of age. The Quartet's public premiere was given by Albert Sammons and W. H. Reed, violins; Raymond Jeremy, viola; and Felix Salmond, cello on 21 May 1919, at the Wigmore Hall, London, the Piano Quintet in A minor also receiving its premiere on this occasion. The group was billed as the "British String Quartet". (Some sources say the London String Quartet gave the premiere, but Albert Sammons was the only member common to both groups.)
