= Leopold Grützmacher =

German cellist and composer

Leopold Grützmacher (born in Dessau, Germany on 4 September 1835, died in Weimar Germany on 26 February 1900) was a German cellist and composer. He was a member of the Leipzig Gewandhaus Orchestra.

== Early life and education ==
He was the younger brother of Friedrich Grützmacher.

== Career ==
He was a member of the Gewandhaus orchestra in Leipzig. Later he was the principal cellist of the Schwerin Hofkapelle, the Landestheater in Prague and then in the Hofkapelle in Meiningen, Germany. From 1876 he was first cellist and chamber music virtuoso in Weimar.

Grützmacher composed two cello concertos and many small cello pieces.

Among his students was Friedrich August Goerner, who went on to teach at Oberlin College in the United States.

== Legacy ==
His son Friedrich was also a cellist.
