= Piano Quintet (Elgar) =

1919 chamber work by Edward Elgar

Edward Elgar, aged about 60

The Quintet in A minor for Piano and String Quartet, Op. 84 is a chamber work by Edward Elgar.

He worked on the Quintet and two other major chamber pieces in the summer of 1918 while staying at Brinkwells near Fittleworth in Sussex. W. H. "Billy" Reed considered that all three were "influenced by the quiet and peaceful surroundings during that wonderful summer".

The Quintet was first performed on 21 May 1919, by the pianist William Murdoch, the violinists Albert Sammons and W. H. Reed, the violist Raymond Jeremy and the cellist Felix Salmond. These players included some of the composer's musical confidantes – Reed worked with him on the Violin Concerto and the Third Symphony, and Salmond on the Cello Concerto. Albert Sammons later made the first complete recording of the Violin Concerto.

The work is dedicated to Ernest Newman, music critic of The Manchester Guardian.

== Movements ==
There are three movements:

1. Moderato – Allegro
2. Adagio
3. Andante – Allegro

In performance, the first movement takes about 14 minutes, the adagio a little under 12, and the last movement a little over 10, making this the longest of Elgar’s chamber works.

His wife's first reaction on hearing the three chamber works was 'E. writing wonderful new music', and more than fifty years later The Gramophone agreed: 'Alice Elgar was quite right: it is a new urgency, pointed and refined by the discipline of writing chamber music, a discipline that clearly rejuvenated Elgar's imagination. It is big chamber music, with at times an almost orchestral sonority to it...'

The Quintet was first recorded by Ethel Hobday with the Spencer Dyke Quartet for the National Gramophonic Society in December 1925. Compton Mackenzie suggested that Elgar himself should play the piano for the recording, but the composer refused the invitation replying, "I never play the pianoforte - I scramble through things orchestrally in a way that would madden with envy all existing pianists".

It was subsequently recorded electrically for His Master's Voice by Harriet Cohen and the Stratton Quartet at the beginning of October 1933, immediately before the composer became seriously ill. Test pressings were rushed to Elgar's bedside; the pleasure he gained from them inspired Fred Gaisberg to record the Quintet as a Christmas present to the ailing composer.

The work took some years to establish itself in the repertoire, but in recent years it has been performed and recorded many times.

== Other versions ==
An orchestration of the Piano Quintet was completed by Donald Fraser in 2015. Its first recording, a performance by the English Symphony Orchestra conducted by Kenneth Woods, was released in May 2016. It received its first performance by the ESO and Woods at the 2015 Elgar Pilgrimage in Elgar Concert Hall at the University of Birmingham in October 2015.

Christopher Morley, the long-time senior critic of the Birmingham Post recognised the historical significance of the premiere, saying of the occasion that it was "one of the two most exciting events I have experienced during a reviewing career approaching half a century. October’s performance under Kenneth Woods in the appropriately named Elgar Concert Hall at Birmingham University was a revelation… This triumph of transcription deserves to be heard worldwide." The performance was later hailed as a 2015 Premiere of the Year in Classical Music magazine.

Musicologist Stephen Johnson, writing for BBC Music Magazine, said of the arrangement that " Fraser hasn’t just translated Elgar’s notes into rich and powerful orchestral terms, he has added (discreetly it must be said) the kinds of touches of colour and splashes of figuration Elgar himself might well have introduced. It really sounds like Elgar… beautifully realised, performed with warmth and understanding, and sympathetically recorded." Andrew Clements wrote in The Guardian that “Fraser’s work on the quintet does genuinely seem to give the music another dimension… As scored by Fraser, certain passages, such as the second subject in the opening movement, immediately connect with the world of the symphonies and the symphonic poem Falstaff… Kenneth Woods’s performance with the English Symphony Orchestra certainly shows that it is a plausible orchestral work.”

== Recordings ==
- In 2003, the BBC Radio 3 ‘Building a Library’ feature recommended a recording by the Sorrel Quartet (Gina McCormack, Catherine Yates, Sarah-Jane Bradley and Helen Thatcher) and Ian Brown on the Chandos label.
- Older recordings include, from the 78 era, the Stratton Quartet/Harriet Cohen version mentioned above, and from the LP years, John Ogdon and the Allegri Quartet, reissued on CD by Dutton and EMI respectively. A recording made c. 1963 for Delta Records by the Aeolian Quartet, successor of the Stratton Quartet, includes Watson Forbes (viola) (with Leonard Cassini, piano), a member of the Strattons in the 1933 recording, so that there is a continuity of tradition in this performance.
- Donald Fraser's orchestration of the Quintet was recorded in Elgar Concert Hall, Birmingham on 9 October 2015 and released in 2016 by Avie Records as AV2362. The performers were Kenneth Woods, conductor and the English Symphony Orchestra. The recording was a Classic FM Recording of the Month in May 2016 and spent eight weeks in the UK Classical Charts.
