= Brodsky Quartet (Adolph Brodsky Manchester) =

The Brodsky Quartet was the second string quartet established and led by violinist Adolph Brodsky.

== History ==
It was established in 1895 in Manchester, after Brodsky left New York and came to the English city to teach at the Royal Manchester College of Music and direct the Hallé Orchestra.

Brodsky played first violin, Rawdon Briggs played second violin, Simon Speelman played the viola, and Carl Fuchs played the cello. After the First World War the membership changed several times, with Brodsky the only original member.

Brodsky and Fuchs, who both admired Edward Elgar, met him in February 1900, when Hans Richter introduced them following a performance of the Enigma Variations Richter conducted in Manchester. Fuchs asked Elgar to compose a string quartet for the Brodsky Quartet. Several years later, in 1918, Elgar completed his String Quartet in E minor, Op. 83 and dedicated it to the Brodsky Quartet.

However, at the time Brodsky and Speelman were nearly seventy years of age and the remainder of the quartet in their fifties and the work premiere was given in London by the "British String Quartet", led by Albert Sammons.

Brodsky had formed the first Brodsky Quartet in Leipzig in 1884.
