= Penelope Spencer =

English dancer

- Born: 30 December 1901; Battersea, London, England
- Died: 3 October 1993 (aged 91); Cranleigh, Surrey, England
- Other names: Penelope Spencer Barman
- Occupation(s): Dancer, choreographer

Penelope Spencer (30 December 1901–3 October 1993) was an English dancer who is remembered for her modern approach to free-style dancing and choreography.

== Early life ==
Born in the London district of Battersea, she was the daughter of geologist Leonard James Spencer and of Edith Mary Close, a schoolteacher. From the age of 11, she was trained in theatre and ballet at the Italia Conti Academy where she studied under the pioneering modern dancer Margaret Morris.

== Career ==
In 1921, on Morris's recommendation, she was engaged by Rutland Boughton to stage dances and choruses for the Glastonbury Festival, some of which he incorporated in his opera The Immortal Hour. She then spent a brief period as principal dancer at the British National Opera Company performing in The Jewels of the Madonna. From 1924, she arranged dances for the productions of Sybil Thorndike and Lewis Casson, including The Cenci and Henry VIII, and also associated with Nigel Playfair, the manager of the Lyric Theatre, Hammersmith. During this period, she also started teaching dance at the Royal College of Music. Her work included dances for the first performance of Vaughan Williams' opera, Hugh the Drover.

Her choreography was influenced by avant-garde artists including Oliver Messel and Lord Berners who composed the music for her successful dance, "Funeral March for the Death of a Rich Aunt" in 1924. In 1927, Constant Lambert, who like Spencer had been influenced by the American black dancing group, The Blackbirds, composed the music for her "Elegiac Blues" (1927), inspired by the death of their star, Florence Mills. In 1932 Spencer and the Camargo Society put on the first performance of Elisabeth Lutyens' ballet The Birthday of the Infanta at the Aldwych Theatre.

In 1939, she was one of the first to dance on television when broadcasting began in 1939. After the war, she arranged dances for two of John Blow's productions, Venus and Adonis. In the late 1960s, she and her husband moved to London where they both provided assistance to the Royal Academy of Dance. After being incapacitated for several years as the result of a dancing injury, Penelope Spencer died of pneumonia on 3 October 1993.

== Assessment ==
The dance critic, Arnold Haskell, described her in 1931 as "the most interesting of all our English non-ballet dancers ... the greatest of her type I have seen in any country." Her son, R. J. Barman, commented that she "brought an innovative vision to English dance and choreography in the 1920s."

== Literature ==
- Robinson, Anne (2010). "Penelope Spencer (1901–93) Dancer and Choreographer: A Chronicle". Dance Research. 28 (1): 74.
- Haskell, Arnold Lionel (1931). Penelope Spencer and Other Studies. British-Continental Press.
