= Etain =

Etain (also Étain, Étáin) can refer to:

- Étaín, a character from Irish mythology
- the fairy princess in Rutland Boughton's opera The Immortal Hour
- the fairy princess in the play The Immortal Hour (play)
- Étain, Meuse, a commune in the Meuse département in France
- Étain-Rouvres Air Base (also Étain Air Base), former name of Base Lieutenant Étienne Mantoux
- Étain, the French word for tin or pewter
