= Mona Caird =

English writer and social reformer (1854–1932)

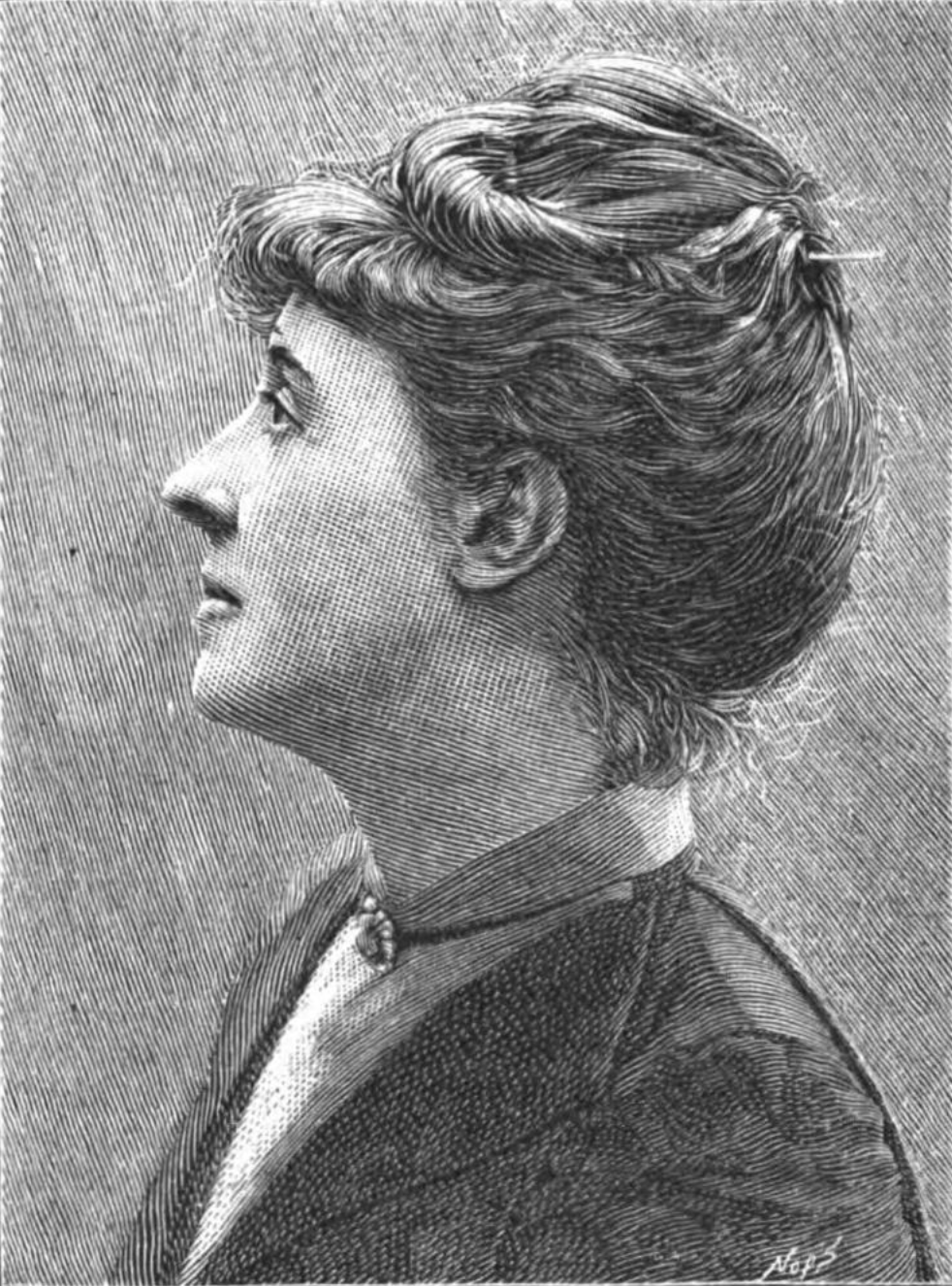
- 1894 engraving based on a photograph by H. S. Mendelssohn
- Born: Alice Mona Alison; 24 May 1854; Ryde, Isle of Wight, England
- Died: 4 February 1932 (aged 77); Hampstead, London, England
- Occupations: Novelist; essayist; social reformer
- Spouse: James Alexander Henryson (m. 1877; died 1921)
- Children: 1
- Writing career
- Pen name: G. Noel Hatton
- Years active: 1883–1931
- Subjects: Feminism; civil liberties; animal rights
- Movement: New Woman

Alice Mona Alison Caird (née Alison; 24 May 1854 (Note: Her birth year is sometimes incorrectly given as 1855 or 1858: England and Wales birth records make it clear that her birth was registered in the July–September quarter of 1854.) – 4 February 1932) was an English novelist, essayist, and social reformer. She wrote on feminism, marriage, motherhood, animal rights and civil liberties. Her essays on women's position in marriage were controversial in the late 19th century.

== Biography ==
Caird was born Alice Mona Alison in Ryde, Isle of Wight, the elder daughter of John Alison of Midlothian, Scotland, who some biographies claim invented the vertical boiler, and Matilda Hector, who the 1871 census records as having been born in Schleswig-Holstein, then part of Denmark. Her parents married on 21 June 1853 in St Leonards, near Glenelg, South Australia; her father was based in Melbourne and her mother was the eldest daughter of John Hector. Caird wrote stories and plays from childhood. The art critic Elizabeth Sharp, who married William Sharp, was reportedly a childhood friend of Caird.

In December 1877, she married James Alexander Henryson, son of Sir James Caird. Her husband farmed about 1700 acres (688 ha) of estates in Cassencary, Creetown, Kirkcudbrightshire, Scotland. He supported her independence, although he lived mainly at Cassencary and Northbrook House, Micheldever, Hampshire, while she spent much time in London and abroad. She mixed with literary people, including Thomas Hardy, who admired her work, and educated herself in the humanities and science. The Cairds had one child, a son born on 22 March 1884 and named Alison James, whom she called Alister. Her husband adopted the surname Henryson-Caird in 1897; he died in 1921.

Mona Caird died on 4 February 1932 in Hampstead, aged 77.

== Activism ==
Caird was active in the women's suffrage movement from her early twenties. She joined the National Society for Women's Suffrage in 1878 and later the Women's Franchise League, the Women's Emancipation Union (WEU), and the London Society for Women's Suffrage. Her essay "Why Women Want the Franchise" was read at the 1892 WEU Conference. In 1908, she published the essay "Militant Tactics and Woman's Suffrage" and took part in the second Hyde Park women's suffrage demonstration. She was also opposed to vivisection, writing on the subject in "The Sanctuary of Mercy" (1895), "Beyond the Pale" (1896), "The Ethics of Vivisection" (1900), and the play "The Logicians: An episode in dialogue" (1902), in which characters argue opposing views on vivisection.

Caird was a member of the Theosophical Society from 1904 to 1909. Her later writings include the illustrated travel book Romantic Cities of Provence (1906), the novel The Stones of Sacrifice (1915), and The Great Wave (1931), a work of social-science fiction critical of racism and negative eugenics.

== Literary works ==
Caird published her first two novels, Whom Nature Leadeth (1883) and One That Wins (1887), under the pseudonym "G. Noel Hatton", but they received little attention. Her later writings were published under her own name. She became prominent in 1888 when the Westminster Review published her article "Marriage", in which she analysed women's position in marriage, called its present state a "vexatious failure", and argued for equality and autonomy between marriage partners. London's Daily Telegraph responded with a series called "Is Marriage a Failure?", which drew a reported 27,000 letters from around the world and continued for three months. Caird argued that her views had been misunderstood, and later that year published another article, "Ideal Marriage". Her essays on marriage and women's position, written between 1888 and 1894, were collected in The Morality of Marriage and Other Essays on the Status and Destiny of Women in 1897.

Caird next published the novel The Wing of Azrael (1889), which deals with marital rape. Its protagonist, Viola Sedley, murders her cruel husband in self-defence. The short story collection A Romance of the Moors followed in 1891; in the title story, a widowed artist, Margaret Ellwood, counsels a young couple to each become independent and self-sufficient. Her best-known novel, The Daughters of Danaus (1894), tells of Hadria Fullerton, who wishes to be a composer but finds that family duties leave her little time for music. The novel has been treated by some scholars as a classic of feminist literature. Also well known is her short story "The Yellow Drawing-Room" (1892), in which Vanora Haydon rejects the conventional separation of male and female spheres. Such works have been described as "fiction of the New Woman".

=== Bibliography ===
Caird wrote seven novels, several short stories, essays and a travel book:

- Whom Nature Leadeth (1883) novel
- One That Wins (1887) novel
- Marriage (1888) essay
- "Ideal Marriage" (1888) essay
- The Wing of Azrael (1889) novel
- "The Emancipation of the Family" (1890) essay
- A Romance of The Moors (1891) stories
- "The Yellow Drawing-Room" (1892) story
- "A Defence of the So-Called Wild Women" (1892) essay
- The Daughters of Danaus (1894) novel
- "The Sanctuary of Mercy" (1895) essay
- "A Sentimental View of Vivisection" (1895) essay
- "Vivisection: An Appeal to the Workers" (1895) essay
- "Beyond the Pale: An Appeal on Behalf of the Victims of Vivisection" (1897) extended essay
- The Morality of Marriage and Other Essays on the Status and Destiny of Women (1897) essays
- The Pathway of the Gods (1898) novel
- "The Ethics of Vivisection" (1900) essay
- The Logicians: An episode in dialogue (1902) play
- Romantic Cities of Provence (1906) travel
- "Militant Tactics and Woman's Suffrage" (1908) essay
- "The Stones of Sacrifice" (1915) essay
- The Great Wave (1931) novel
