= Arthurian cycle (Boughton) =

The English composer Rutland Boughton's Arthurian cycle consists of five music dramas in a Romantic and sometimes Wagnerian musical style, presenting the legend of King Arthur from his begetting to his death:

- The Birth of Arthur, originally called Uther and Igraine, 2 acts, first performed 1920
- The Round Table, prologue and 3 acts, first performed 1916
- The Lily Maid, 3 acts, first performed 1934
- Galahad, 4 scenes, never performed, written 1943–1944
- Avalon, 2 acts, never performed, written 1944–1945.

The librettos of the first two are by the poet Reginald Buckley, heavily revised by Boughton, and those of the last three are by Boughton. Intended for Boughton's Glastonbury Festival, they were never widely produced elsewhere and have been almost entirely unperformed since Boughton's heyday between the two world wars. Critical judgement on the five music dramas has been mixed, and The Lily Maid is the only one considered still capable of revival. The scores have never been published.

== Composition and performances ==
=== Inception ===
Boughton conceived the idea of an Arthurian cycle of music dramas in 1906, when he read Sir Thomas Malory's Le Morte d'Arthur. He made little progress until he received from the young journalist and poet Reginald Buckley the manuscript of a dramatic poem, later published under the title Arthur of Britain (1914), which was also based on Le Morte d'Arthur. Buckley had initially intended this as a closet drama, but subsequently he tried to interest Sir Edward Elgar in setting the poem to music, then Granville Bantock, and finally, at Bantock's suggestion, Boughton, who agreed to collaborate.

=== The Birth of Arthur and The Round Table ===
Buckley rewrote his poem on lines dictated by Boughton in order to make it more dramatic, then Boughton set to work on the first music drama of the cycle, Uther and Igraine, beginning in 1908 and completing his task the following year. In 1911 they published this first libretto along with essays by both men in a volume called Music-Drama of the Future. Boughton and Buckley conceived a series of music festivals to take place in Glastonbury, a kind of English Bayreuth where their Arthurian "choral dramas", as Boughton called them, and other works would be performed. At the first of them, to be held in 1913, Uther and Igraine would have been staged, but when plans for this 1913 festival collapsed, orchestral excerpts and some scenes from it, now renamed The Birth of Arthur, were instead performed at a summer school in Bournemouth in August of that year. On 5 August 1914, just as Britain entered the First World War, the first of the Glastonbury Festivals began in spite of a serious and continuing shortage of resources. As George Bernard Shaw later wrote, Boughton was

one of those happily constituted men who can never see any reason for not doing anything, and he started with whatever means he had and whatever people he could find. Having no band, he accompanied on the piano. There being no theatre, his partner [Christina Walshe] made a fit-up, painting the decorations on anything that was lying about, and making the dresses out of fabrics of all sorts.

The Birth of Arthur, scheduled for the 1914 festival, fell victim to these problems and was only performed in extract. In 1915 Glastonbury again saw a scene from The Birth of Arthur, along with a staging of Buckley's Arthur of Britain as a play rather than as a cycle of music dramas.

Boughton now turned his attention to Buckley's libretto for the second opera, The Round Table, drastically revising it to suit his own taste, as indeed he was legally entitled to do, Buckley having long ago transferred the musical rights to him. This nevertheless worsened the already uneasy professional relationship between the two men, and from December 1915 their creative collaboration was at an end. The Round Table was completed in time for a premiere at the Glastonbury Festival on 14 August 1916, with a cast that included the baritones Percy Heming and Frederic Austin. It was well received by the audience. There was a hiatus in the run of Glastonbury Festivals from September 1916 to April 1919 due to Boughton's military service, and towards the end of this period Buckley fell ill and died, but in 1919 the Festival was revived and The Round Table was given a second performance. At the 1920 summer festival, on 16 August, The Birth of Arthur finally had its first complete performance, and both operas were revived at the 1925 festival.

=== The Lily Maid ===
The first draft of Boughton's libretto (Buckley's poem having now been discarded) for the third opera of the cycle, The Lily Maid, was written as early as 1917; its theme, the story of Elaine of Astolat. In 1921 a performance was projected for the following year, but as late as 1932, when he wrote a piece for violin and piano called "Winter Sun" based on themes from The Lily Maid, the opera itself had still not been completed. It was premiered in Stroud, Gloucestershire, on 10 September 1934, and had a fortnight's run at the Winter Garden Theatre, London in January 1937, Steuart Wilson conducting a cast that included John Fullard, Sybil Evers, and Arthur Fear. It was revived by Michael Hurd at Chichester, West Sussex, on 10 July 1985.

=== Galahad and Avalon ===
In October 1943 Boughton returned to the unfinished Arthurian cycle, writing the libretti to two operas, Galahad and Avalon. Galahad was composed during 1943 and 1944; for one of its four scenes he reused the libretto (by Boughton himself, after William Morris) and the music of his 1904 work, The Chapel in Lyonesse. Avalon, the last of his Arthurian music dramas, was written in 1944–1945. Plans to produce these two operas, or others of his works, to celebrate Boughton's 80th birthday in 1958 did not come to fruition, and as of 2025 neither has been performed.

== Influences ==
The Arthurian cycle's musical style evolved in some respects over the long period of its composition. It began firmly in the Wagnerian tradition – indeed, both Boughton and Buckley initially conceived the cycle as an English equivalent to Der Ring des Nibelungen – with influences also from Debussy, English folk music, and English choral music. Though it developed in the later operas it remained Romantic, ignoring innovations in 20th-century music. Galahad was particularlyly eclectic, showing strong influence from Mussorgsky in one scene and from Brahms and Tchaikovsky in another (the recycled Chapel in Lyonesse).

From 1926 to 1956 Boughton was intermittently a member of the Communist Party, though his ideology is said to have owed more to Ruskin and Morris than to Marxism–Leninism. His librettos for the later operas are heavily marked by his conviction that Christianity was a dying moral force which would be replaced by socialism, political didacticism taking over from the mythological poetry of the earlier operas. This can be seen particularly clearly as the cycle reaches its climax in the final scene of Avalon, where the turmoil of King Arthur's declining years ends with a peasant revolt offering the hope of a new socialist dawn.

== Reception ==
The critic Edward Dent wrote in 1945 that "Nobody can really form an adequate judgment [of the Arthurian cycle as a whole] until it is performed in a proper theatre with all the scenic and orchestral resources that it demands," but at the time all attempts to stage such a production failed, the cycle being considered "too long, uneven, obsolete, anachronistic...sometimes musically disappointing [and] difficult to stage". A complete performance, in fact, is still awaited, and any judgement must be based, at least in part, on the unpublished manuscripts of the scores.

Boughton's biographer, Michael Hurd, noted that the cycle as a whole suffers from a lack of unity. He believed that The Birth of Arthur showed "a great deal of Wagnerian conviction", and that "[i]n the unlikely event of a place ever being found in the modern opera house for romantic-historical works, The Round Table might well be a contender", but was less kind to the final two operas: "Though there are many beautiful passages, the general level of inspiration does not match the heroic nature of the action". Avalon in particular he counted as the worst of Boughton's ten operas. The early librettos he considered to be marred by a lack of any theatrical instinct on Buckley's part, and the later ones by Boughton's fustian syntax and vocabulary. He summed the cycle up as "a ruin perhaps, but undeniably impressive".

The Lily Maid, the third opera of the cycle, is here considered separately as it has been credited with virtues not seen to the same extent in the other four. Its premiere was welcomed by The Times with enthusiasm: "Those who want to hear the best that contemporary opera can do should visit Stroud this week". The composer Alan Bush called it "one of the most beautiful and one of the most truly original operas of recent times". The scholar Nadège Le Lan has written that in "[t]aking up the challenge of imitating the greatest, Boughton excels with The Lily Maid"; he "manages...to resurrect Arthur, and not just to exhume him". Michael Hurd considered that "Musically...it is outstanding: opulently romantic in its orchestration, harmonically rich, and uninhibited in its reliance on simple, heartfelt melodies. It is the one part of the cycle that could be presented to a modern audience without apology, for it is the one part that touched Boughton's heart and drew from him some of his finest music." He thought the libretto worthy of the music: "Only when he was dealing with emotions he could relate to on a personal level (as in The Lily Maid) was he able to achieve what he presumably set out to find: the simplicity of folk poetry."
