= Philip Sainton =

British-French composer, conductor, and violist (1891 - 1967)

Philip Prosper Sainton (10 November 1891 – 2 September 1967) was a British–French composer, conductor, and violist.

== Early career ==
He was born in Arques-la-Bataille, in Seine-Maritime, France, grandson to violinist Prosper Sainton and contralto Charlotte Helen Sainton-Dolby, but the family soon moved to Godalming, Surrey in the UK. His father, Charles Prosper, was a painter and his mother, born Amy Foster, was a singer. He started his music studies learning the violin. In 1913 he entered the Royal Academy of Music in London, where he studied composition under Frederick Corder and viola under Lionel Tertis.

Shortly after World War I (during which he was a cipher officer in Cairo) he joined the Queen's Hall orchestra, and in 1925 he was also appointed principal viola of the Royal Philharmonic Society's orchestra. These positions were relinquished in 1929 when he was asked to replace Harry Waldo Warner in the London Quartet. In 1930 he joined the BBC Symphony Orchestra.

== Composer ==
His composition activities had begun early. The premiere of his first orchestral work, Sea Pictures, took place at the Queen's Hall Proms on 4 September 1923 with the composer conducting. It was repeated the following year. Other Proms premieres included Harlequin and Columbine on 1 October 1925 and the ballet The Dream of a Marionette on 13 August 1929. In 1935, Sir Henry Wood conducted the premiere of his Serenade Fantastique with Bernard Shore playing the viola. During the 1940s he was a professor of Ensemble at the Guildhall School of Music.

Today, he is perhaps most remembered as the composer of the score for John Huston's 1956 film Moby Dick. Martin Anderson described it as "a vast, alfresco ballet danced by the sea itself" which "points to what was lost when ill-health prevented the already deeply self-critical Sainton from tackling the symphony he had long planned." The score - restored and partially re-constructed by J. Morgan and W. Stromberg in the late 1990s - shows the combined influence of Ravel, Delius and Vaughan Williams.

Modern recordings on Marco Polo and Chandos of Moby Dick, his tone poem The Island (1939), the symphonic elegy Nadir (first performed in 1949) as well as The Dream of a Marionette have helped the process of re-evaluating his music after years of neglect. Sainton also orchestrated a number of scores by the amateur South African composer J.S. Gerber.

== Personal life and death ==
In April 1915 he married the harpist Gwendolen Mason (1883-1977), who was later professor of Harp at the Royal Academy of Music, where she taught Osian Ellis. His second wife was Raymonde McGeoch, whom he met and married in 1935. He died in Petersfield, Hampshire in England. His daughter Barbara Clark (from his second marriage) holds many of the remaining scores.

His name is remembered in the Musicians' Book of Remembrance in the Musician's Chapel within the Church of the Holy Sepulchre, (The Musicians' Church) in London.

== Works ==
Stage

- The Dream of the Marionette, Ballet (1929)

Orchestral

- Sea Pictures (1923–1924) (aka Two Orchestral Pieces)
- Harlequin and Columbine (published 1925)
- The Dream of a Marionette ballet (1929)
- Sérénade Fantastique for Viola and Orchestra (1935) (also arranged for oboe)
- The Island, Tone Poem (1939) - recording conducted by Matthias Bamert, 1992
- Caricature (1940)
- Nadir, Tone Poem (1942)
- Moby Dick, Suite from the Film (1956)

The Clipper

- Carnival

Chamber music

- Crépuscule for Viola and Piano (1935)
- Phantom Gavotte for Viola and Piano

Vocal

- Even for Me for Voice and Piano
- He Was My King for Voice and Piano; words by Helen Waddell
- Jonah's Hymn from Moby Dick for Voice and Piano
- Leaves, Shadows and Dreams for Voice and Piano; words by Fiona Macleod
- A Night in Spring for Voice and Piano; words by Clifford Bax
- Shieling Song for Voice and Piano; words by Fiona Macleod
- The Song of the Wind Bell for Voice and Piano; words by Harold Acton
- A Walk by the River at Night for Voice and Piano; words by Clifford Bax

Film music

- Moby Dick (1956)
- A King in New York (1957); incomplete

Orchestrations of works by Jack Sydney Gerber (1902-1979)

- Balaton Rhapsody
- Fiesta
- Prelude to Stonehenge
- The Sea
