= The Pagan Review =

Magazine written and published by William Sharp

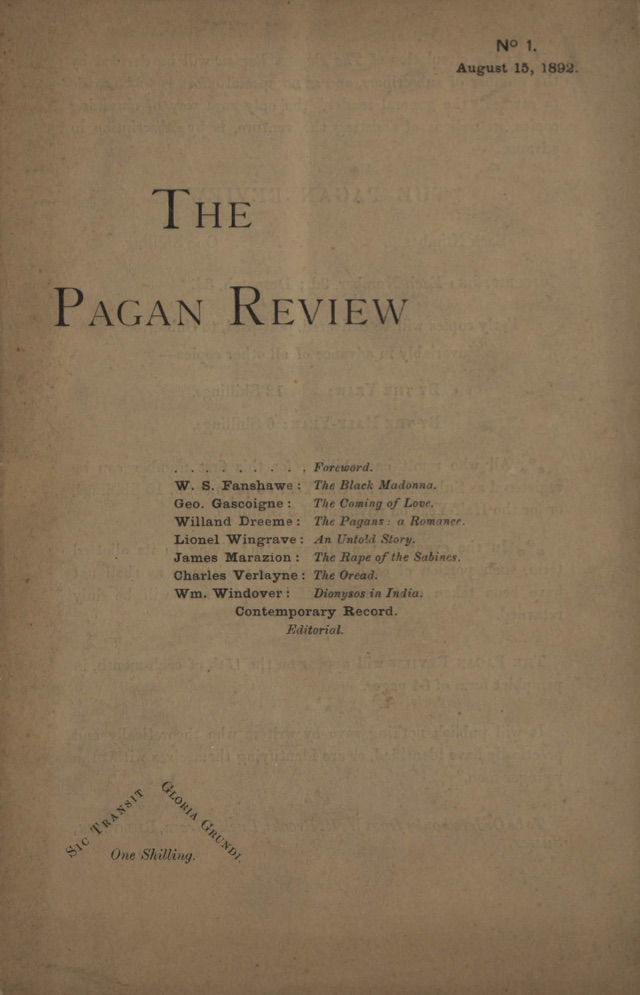
Cover of the only issue of The Pagan Review

The Pagan Review was a literary magazine published in one issue in August 1892. It was created by the Scottish writer William Sharp, who was called a pagan in a review of his poetry collection Sospiri di Roma (1891) and came to embrace the label. The magazine promoted a modern form of paganism focused on equality between the sexes. The content, which was written by Sharp under a variety of pseudonyms, consisted of prose fiction, poems, an unfinished play, and reviews of recent literature.

When it was published, The Pagan Review was accused of being far removed from ancient paganism. Retrospectively, the magazine has been analyzed in the context of the Victorian era's literary paganism and the New Woman movement.

== Background ==
William Sharp (1855–1905) was a Scottish writer who defended the creation of beauty and wanted to challenge the Victorian era's norms for poetic form and sexuality. He was called a pagan in The Scotsman's review of his poetry collection Sospiri di Roma (1891), which was written in Rome and used naked ancient statues as a starting point for praising human sensuality. Sharp first objected to this label, which he associated with sensuality at the expense of ethics and the absence of religiosity, but soon appropriated it for his own purposes. In a letter written in Paris on 23 April 1892, he addressed his friends Catherine Ann and Thomas Allibone Janvier as "fellow Pagans".

The Pagan Review was written soon after Sharp and his wife Elizabeth had settled in the countryside of Sussex, ending their bohemian lifestyle in Italy and France and starting a productive period of writing. It was intended as a quarterly magazine and edited by Sharp under the pseudonym W. H. Brooks, a nod to his maternal grandfather William Brooks.

Sharp's diary entry from 2 June 1892 mentions that he had started to write the story "The Rape of the Sabines". It was based on a story a woman told him during a visit to San Polo dei Cavalieri. The diary entry says it was for the White Review, and the colour white figures prominently in Sospiri di Roma, in descriptions of marble, flowers, statues and bodies. As the content of the magazine evolved, White was replaced by Pagan. "The Pagans: a Memory" was written on 3 and 4 June and appears to be partially autobiographical, as it mirrors Sharp's time with his lover Edith Rinder in Rome and Paris.

== Contents ==
The first issue of The Pagan Review was published on 15 August 1892 and contained the following texts, all written by Sharp under a variety of pseudonyms.

Title	Pseudonym	Summary
"Foreword"	W. H. Brooks	The editor introduces the magazine as an expression of the pagan current within the young generation in literature. He says this type of paganism does not yet have a proper name, but it supports equality between men and women and celebrates marriage and life.
"The Black Madonna"	W. S. Fanshawe	A short story set somewhere in Africa. During a religious festival that involves repeated human sacrifices at a goddess statue, Bihr the Chief questions the goddess' existence. She reveals herself to him and explains that only she is eternal and other gods are expressions of her. Bihr becomes infatuated with the goddess and tries, against her warnings, to marry her, which ends with him crucified and nailed to a nearby rock.
"The Coming of Love"	George Gascoigne	A poem in four quatrains that describes landscapes with osier beds and soft winds which evoke joy. The poet asks who all this belongs to.
"The Pagans: a Memory"	Willand Dreeme	Presented as the opening chapter of a novel about the love between a Scotsman and a female French painter of Scottish and Irish descent. The woman's brother, who also is a painter and lives with her, does not approve of their bohemian preferences and the couple end up leaving Paris together. The story is called "The Pagans: a Romance" in the table of content.
"An Untold Story"	Lionel Wingrave	A poem consisting of two sonnets.
"The Rape of the Sabines"	James Marazion	A short story set in Sabina, Italy, where two muleteer cousins are in secret relationships with two local sisters. The girls' father refuses to let them marry anyone who is not a Sabine and arranges weddings with two other men. At the night of the double wedding, the cousins, assisted by the sisters' younger brother, hide in the girls' room, murder the grooms and leave with the three siblings.
"The Oread"	Charles Verleyne	Presented as a fragment from an upcoming book titled La Morte s'Amuse. In Scotland, an Oread encounters a man for the first time. She is scared and confused by his clothes, but when she catches him swimming nude, she is calmed and chooses him as her mate.
"Dionysos in India"	Wm. Windover	A fragment of a play set in the Himalayas. Three fauns anticipate the arrival of a blind and lost god.
"Pastels in Prose"	S.	A review of Pastels in Prose (1890), an anthology of French prose poems translated to English by Stuart Merrill.
"Contemporary Record"	W. H. Brooks	Brief reviews of The Sisters by Algernon Charles Swinburne, One of Our Conquerors by George Meredith, The Foresters by Alfred Tennyson and La Débâcle by Émile Zola. Notes on the deaths of Robert Bulwer-Lytton and Walt Whitman. Short comments on new works by Hall Caine, Rudyard Kipling, William Hurrell Mallock, Robert Louis Stevenson and Maurice Maeterlinck.

The Pagan Review was officially discontinued after one issue when Sharp returned all subscriptions with the following message:

On the 15th of September, still-born The Pagan Review.

Regretted by none, save the affectionate parents and a few forlorn friends, The Pagan Review has returned to the void whence it came. The progenitors, more hopeful than reasonable, look for an unglorious but robust resurrection at some more fortunate date. "For of such is the Kingdom of Paganism."

— W. H. Brooks.

== Analysis and reception ==
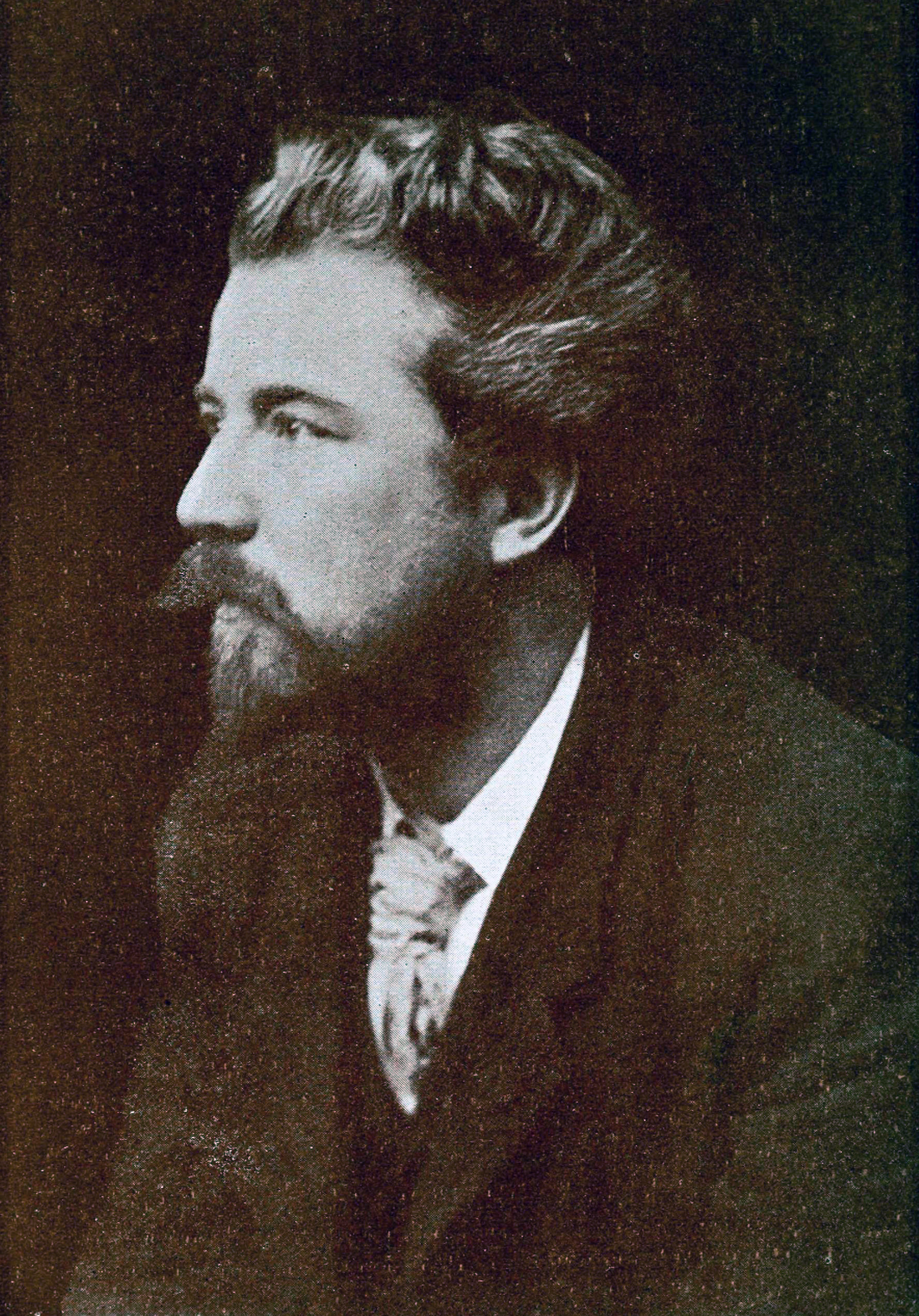
William Sharp in 1894

The Saturday Review published a review The Pagan Review on 3 September 1892, where the magazine was described as poorly written and devoid of something to say. Regarding its knowledge of paganism, the critic wrote:

There can be no better cure for the errors of Neo-paganism than a study of the old pagans, Homer, Sophocles, Virgil. They, not M. Paul Verlaine, not even Mr. George Meredith, not even Beaudelaire (as the Pagan Review calls that author, who himself smote the Neo-Pagans in a memorable essay) are the guides to follow.

In her book William Sharp / Fiona Macleod: A Memoir (1910), Elizabeth Sharp described The Pagan Review as a product of Sharp's "mental attitude at that moment, ... a sheer reveling in the beauty of objective life and nature, while he rode the crest of the wave of health and exuberant spirits that had come to him in Italy after his prolonged illness and convalescence". Edward Lewis wrote in The Atlantic in 1917 that The Pagan Review failed because of its outspoken paganism, arguing that such a label can have merit among friends but has an "extinguishing effect" when used in public. Lewis said Sharp "may have thought that it was the NeoPagan element in his books which made them so attractive to a large and faithful company of readers, and he may have been quite right in so thinking; but he did not perceive the risks he ran in abstracting them from their imaginative and literary setting, and exposing them in all the nakedness of their proper name".

The literary scholar Bénédicte Coste associates Sharp's "new paganism" with a late 19th-century trend of launching movements with the word "new". She says The Pagan Review "provides a surprisingly comprehensive overview of what paganism came to represent for some late-Victorians", placing it in a context of declining religious authority, scientific discourses, the British Empire's contacts with non-Christian populations, and an envisioned return to primeval nature in reaction to urbanisation and the Victorian social norms. Literary paganism had existed in Germany since the late 18th century and influenced British Romantic writers, before a broader fascination with paganism emerged in the United Kingdom in the 1890s through James George Frazer's The Golden Bough and literary critics such as F. W. Barry, who used the word "neo-pagan" for writers who preferred Celtic and classical subjects over Christian influences. Coste associates this version of paganism with how Walter Pater in 1867 had defined paganism as a timeless sentiment that articulates human finitude and persists as an element in all religions. Writing for Toronto Metropolitan University's project Y90s Classroom, Omeir Syed Ali analyzes The Pagan Review and in particular "The Pagans" as an expression of late 19th-century Romanticism and the New Woman movement. The latter sought to establish equal social standing for men and women and was a precursor to feminism.

== See also ==
- Modern paganism in the United Kingdom
