= Gwendolen Mason =

Welsh harpist (1883–1977)

Gwendolen Mason, OBE (24 May 1883 – 2 July 1977) was a Welsh harpist. She was born in Menai Bridge, Anglesey, the daughter of John Eilan Mason Parry and his wife Sarah. She studied at the Royal College of Music with John Thomas.

She was one of the first harpists in the UK to perform Ravel's Introduction and Allegro, at Bechstein Hall in 1913 under the composer's direction. In 1923 she recorded the work, also under Ravel's direction, for the Columbia record company.

York Bowen’s Arabesque for solo harp (1913) was dedicated to Mason. On 15 December 1920 she played in the premiere of Arthur Bliss's Rout, for wordless soprano and chamber ensemble, at the London (Piccadilly) home of Baroness d'Erlanger, conducted by the composer. On 5 December 1942 Mason played in the first performance of Benjamin Britten's A Ceremony of Carols, for three-part treble voices and harp, in the library of Norwich Castle.

Mason has been described by Geraint Lewis as "the leading British harpist of the inter-war and immediate post-war periods". She played with the Royal Opera House and London Symphony orchestras, and taught at the Royal Academy of Music from 1915 until 1959 and at the Royal College of Music from 1920 until 1954. Her star pupil at the academy was Osian Ellis (who succeeded her as Professor of Harp), but she also taught Gwendoline and Margaret Davies, Shân Emlyn Jones, Sheila Bromberg and Derek Bell of the Chieftains.

Mason was still teaching, broadcasting and making regular concert appearances in the 1950s and early 1960s: for instance she performed with the English String Quartet in the Centenary Concert in memory of Ethel Smyth on 29 October 1958. Smyth was an admirer, who wrote several elaborate harp parts for Mason in her operas and songs.

In April 1915 she married the composer Philip Sainton, and during the 1920s they were a high-profile musical couple. They later divorced, and Sainton married again in 1935. Her address in 1935 was 6, Sussex Place, London SW7. By 1950 she was living at 29 Campden Grove in Kensington. She died in July 1977 at the age of 93 in Oxford.
