= Sheila Bromberg =

British harpist (1928–2021)

- Born: 2 September 1928; London, England
- Died: 17 August 2021 (aged 92); Aylesbury, England
- Education: Royal College of Music; University of Greenwich
- Occupation: Musician
- Known for: Harp

Sheila Bromberg (2 September 1928 – 17 August 2021) was a British harpist who performed in both classical and popular settings. She is best known for playing on the Beatles’ song "She's Leaving Home" on their 1967 album Sgt. Pepper's Lonely Hearts Club Band.

== Early life ==
Sheila Zelda Patricia Bromberg was born on 2 September 1928 in London, England, the daughter of Michael Bromberg and Rose Lyons. Her father was an orchestral viola player of Russian descent who had played with the Scottish National Orchestra and her mother was a seamstress. Her family was Jewish. Her paternal grandfather was a noted Jewish musician in Ukraine who was forced to depart to escape anti-Jewish pogroms. Her son was also an orchestral musician.

== Education ==
Bromberg studied the piano from an early age. She took lessons from a Russian uncle and became an accomplished pianist. She studied the harp with Gwendolen Mason at London’s Royal College of Music, where she graduated in 1949. At the age of 70 she received a degree from the University of Greenwich in music therapy.

== Career ==
Bromberg played harp in the London Philharmonic Orchestra, the Royal Philharmonic Orchestra, the BBC Concert Orchestra and the Royal Liverpool Philharmonic. She also performed in the orchestra for the London run of the musical Phantom of the Opera. She played harp on the soundtracks of two James Bond films in the 1960s, Dr. No and Goldfinger. In addition, she earned regular wages as a session musician for popular artists such as Frank Sinatra, Bing Crosby, the Bee Gees, Dusty Springfield, and Sammy Davis Jr.

In March 1967 Bromberg, then a single mother with two small children, was hired at Abbey Road studios in London to play harp on the recording of "She's Leaving Home", one of the songs on the Beatles' Sgt. Pepper's Lonely Hearts Club Band album. This made her the second woman to perform on a Beatles song, the first having been Joy Hall, mistakenly credited as "John" Hall, who a number of weeks earlier had played cello on "Strawberry Fields Forever". Her playing on the song has been said to "define the piece". Bromberg and the orchestra went through three hours of takes until midnight, and when the album came out she realized McCartney had used her first take. She said later that she found it "a little bizarre" that she became known for four bars of music. In 2011 she told the BBC that she was "very proud to have been part of it".

Bromberg was a member of the BBC's Top of the Pops orchestra in the 1960s and 1970s. Top of the Pops was considered to be England's most popular music television programme at the time. She played the signature introduction on the recording of "Boogie Nights", a hit single in 1976 by the disco band Heatwave. Bromberg was an orchestra regular on the highly rated British television show Morecambe and Wise. She performed in many TV commercials as well as in a Monty Python's Flying Circus sketch, in which she played the harp in a wheelbarrow. In retirement she taught harp and piano, and trained to use music to help children with mental disabilities. In 2011 she was reported to be living at Rock Hill in Chipping Norton, Oxfordshire. In 2013, aged 84, she was living and teaching music in the village of Lane End, Buckinghamshire.

== Personal life ==
Bromberg married Sydney Laurence in 1949 after graduating. They later divorced. She had two children, Naomi Venables and David Laurence, and five grandchildren. Her cousin is the American musician and songwriter David Bromberg.

== Death ==
Bromberg died on August 17, 2021, in Aylesbury, England.
