= Prosper Sainton =

French violinist

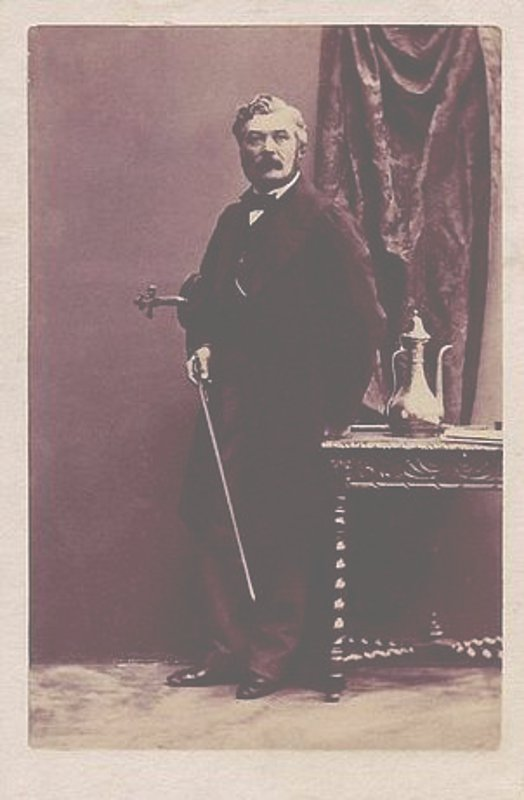
- Prosper Sainton 1860

Background information
- Instrument: violin

Prosper Philippe Catherine Sainton (5 June 1813 – 17 October 1890) was a French violinist.

== Life ==
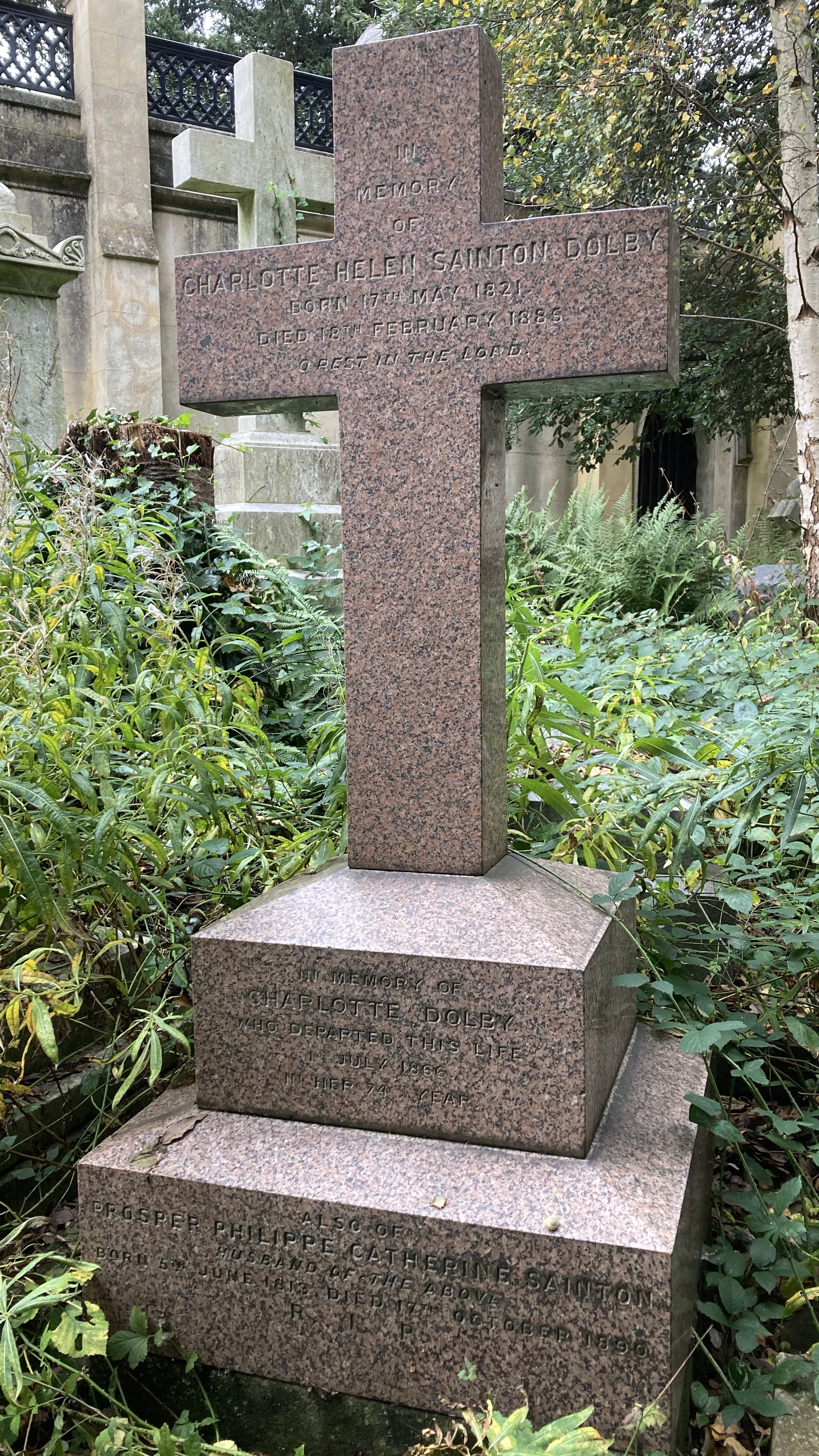
Grave of Prosper Sainton in Highgate Cemetery

Sainton was the son of a merchant at Toulouse, where he was born. He entered the Paris Conservatoire under François Antoine Habeneck in 1831, and became professor of the violin in the Conservatoire of Toulouse.

In 1844 he made his first appearance in England, at a Philharmonic concert directed by Mendelssohn. Settling in London, he was in 1845 appointed professor at the Royal Academy of Music. In the early organizations for chamber music which culminated in the establishment of the Popular Concerts, Sainton bore an important part; and when the Royal Italian Opera was started at Covent Garden, he led the orchestra under Michael Costa, with whom he migrated to Her Majesty's Theatre in 1871.

From 1848 to 1855 Sainton was leader of the Queen's Band, and in 1862 he conducted the music at the opening of the International Exhibition. In 1860, he married the famous contralto singer, Charlotte Dolby. He was leader of the principal provincial festivals for many years, and gave a farewell concert at the Royal Albert Hall in 1883. He died in October 1890. His method was sound, his style artistic, and his educational work of great value, the majority of the most successful orchestral violinists having been his pupils.

His grandson was composer, conductor and violist Philip Sainton (1891–1967).

He is buried with his wife, Charlotte, on the western side of Highgate Cemetery.
