= The Immortal Hour (play) =

1899 play

The Immortal Hour is an 1899 play by Scottish playwright Fiona Macleod, a pseudonym of writer William Sharp, loosely based on the Irish myth The Wooing of Etain. It was first published complete in the November 1900 issue of The Fortnightly Review and posthumously published in book form in 1907 (US) and 1908 (UK).

== Dalua ==
Dalua is a character in the play. Although the play uses characters and settings from Celtic mythology, the character of Dalua was the invention of Macleod. He is a brooding and fateful presence, known alternatively as the Amadan-Dhu, the Dark One, the Faery Fool. He claims to be even more ancient than the gods. It is through his movements and gestures that he affects the feelings and desires of the other characters and thus drives the fatal, hubristic pursuit of the Faery princess Etain by the mortal king Eochaidh; later, at the end of the work, he steps in and touches the king, who consequently dies.

== Opera ==
In 1912 the English composer Rutland Boughton composed an opera of the same name with a libretto adapted from the play. It ran in London for 216 consecutive performances in 1922, and for a further 160 performances the following year, and was staged in New York City in 1926. It was revived at the Sadler's Wells Theatre in London in 1953. The first recording of the complete work was released in 1983.
