= She's Leaving Home =

1967 song by the Beatles

- Sheet music cover

Song by the Beatles

from the album Sgt. Pepper's Lonely Hearts Club Band
- Released: 26 May 1967
- Recorded: 17 and 20 March 1967
- Studio: EMI, London
- Genre: Baroque pop; orchestral pop
- Length: 3:26 (mono), 3:35 (stereo)
- Label: Parlophone (UK); Capitol (US)
- Songwriter: Lennon–McCartney
- Producer: George Martin

"She's Leaving Home" is a song by the English rock band the Beatles, written by Paul McCartney and John Lennon, released on their 1967 album Sgt. Pepper's Lonely Hearts Club Band. It tells the story of a teenager running away from home due to feeling stifled by her well-meaning but overprotective parents, who are confused and devastated upon learning of her departure.

Paul McCartney wrote and sang the verse and John Lennon wrote the chorus, which they sang together. Neither George Harrison nor Ringo Starr was involved in the track's recording. The song's backing track was performed by a string orchestra under the arrangement of Mike Leander, making it one of the few Beatles recordings on which none of the band members plays an instrument.

== Background ==
McCartney was inspired to write the song after reading a Daily Mail article about Melanie Coe, a 17-year-old runaway from Stamford Hill. McCartney fictionalised much of the song's narrative, but Coe has said it is largely accurate to her own experience. The only inaccuracies were that Coe's boyfriend was a croupier, not a car dealer, and that she left in the afternoon, not the morning. Coe was found ten days after leaving because she had inadvertently revealed her boyfriend's workplace. Upon returning home, she was pregnant and had an abortion.

Coincidentally, Coe had met McCartney in 1963, when he chose her as the prizewinner in a dancing contest on ITV's Ready Steady Go!. An update on Coe appeared in The Guardian in December 2008, and she was interviewed about the song on the BBC programme The One Show on 24 November 2010. In May 2017, Rolling Stone magazine carried an interview with Coe to commemorate the 50th anniversary of the album's release.

John and I wrote "She's Leaving Home" together. It was my inspiration. We'd seen a story in the newspaper about a young girl who had left home and not been found. There were a lot of those at the time, and that was enough to give us a story line. So I started to get the lyrics. She slips out and leaves a note and then the parents wake up and then ... It was rather poignant. I like it as a song, and when I showed it to John, he added the Greek chorus.

—Paul McCartney, Many Years From Now by Barry Miles, 1997

It was John's idea for the words of the old couple, "What did we do that was wrong?", in the background. He was looking at the misused old people and also the conflict between them and the young girl. Originally, it was undoubtedly Paul's song, but John contributed quite a bit in a way with the answering chorus. Mike Leander did the score for the song, because Paul wanted it done at a drop of the hat and I was recording Cilla Black on the day he wanted to go through it. So it was the song that got away. It was the song I wanted to do.

—George Martin, 1967

== Recording ==
"She's Leaving Home" was recorded during the sessions for the Beatles' Sgt. Pepper's Lonely Hearts Club Band. The day before McCartney wanted to work on the song's score, he learned that George Martin, who usually handled the Beatles' string arrangements, was unavailable. McCartney contacted Mike Leander, who did it in Martin's place. This was the first time a Beatles song was not arranged by Martin. Martin, though hurt by this, produced the song and conducted the string section in a session on 17 March 1967 that generated six takes. The melody is modal, like English traditional music. The harp is played by Sheila Bromberg, the second female musician to appear on a Beatles record, after cellist Joy Hall, who performed on "Strawberry Fields Forever". Three days later, McCartney's lead vocal and Lennon's backing vocal were recorded, with the two singing together on each of two vocal tracks, their voices overlapping to match the narrative.

The stereo version of the song, finalised on 17 April 1967, runs at a slower speed than the mono mix, completed on 20 March 1967, and consequently is a semitone lower in pitch. According to a 2007 Mojo article, the final mono mix was sped up to make McCartney sound younger. The subsequent stereo mix was not sped up, remaining in the original tempo and key. In 2017, for the 50th anniversary edition of Sgt. Pepper's Lonely Hearts Club Band, Giles Martin and Sam Okell remixed the song's stereo version to match the adjusted speed of the mono version. The six-disc version of the anniversary edition also included the previously unreleased first mono mix of "She's Leaving Home", which contains a brief cello phrase at the end of the first two choruses that was removed from the released mixes of the song.

Paul McCartney said of the song in a December 1984 interview:

I wrote that. My kind of ballad from that period. My daughter likes that one. One of my daughters likes that. Still works. The other thing I remember is that George Martin was offended that I used another arranger. He was busy and I was itching to get on with it; I was inspired. I think George had a lot of difficulty forgiving me for that. It hurt him; I didn't mean to.

== Critical reception ==
In April 1967, McCartney visited Brian Wilson of the Beach Boys in Los Angeles, where McCartney played "She's Leaving Home" on the piano for Wilson and his wife. Wilson recalled: "We both just cried. It was beautiful." As the credited composers of "She's Leaving Home", Lennon and McCartney received the 1967 Ivor Novello award for Best Song Musically and Lyrically.

Composer Ned Rorem once called "She's Leaving Home" "equal to any song that Schubert ever wrote". In one of the few non-laudatory contemporary reviews of Sgt. Pepper, Richard Goldstein, writing in The New York Times, cited the song as an example of the album's reliance on production over quality songwriting. Goldstein said: "'She's Leaving Home' preserves all the orchestrated grandeur of 'Eleanor Rigby', but its framework is emaciated ... Where 'Eleanor Rigby' compressed tragedy into poignant detail, 'She's Leaving Home' is uninspired narrative, and nothing more." Author Ian MacDonald considered "She's Leaving Home" to be one of the two best songs on the album, along with "A Day in the Life". In his comments on Sgt. Pepper and its legacy, musicologist Allan Moore highlights these contrasting views as two critics judging the work by "opposing criteria", with Goldstein writing during the dawn of the counterculture of the 1960s, and MacDonald, writing in the 1990s, "intensely aware of [the movement's] failings".

In 2018, the music staff of Time Out London ranked "She's Leaving Home" 12th on their list of the best Beatles songs.

== Personnel ==
According to Ian MacDonald:

- Paul McCartney – double-tracked vocal, backing vocal
- John Lennon – double-tracked vocal, backing vocal
- Mike Leander – string arrangement
- George Martin – conductor, producer
- Erich Gruenberg – violin
- Derek Jacobs – violin
- Trevor Williams – violin
- José Luis García – violin
- John Underwood – viola
- Stephen Shingles – viola
- Dennis Vigay – cello
- Alan Dalziel – cello
- Gordon Pearce – double bass
- Sheila Bromberg – harp

== Billy Bragg version ==
A version of the song by Billy Bragg with Cara Tivey reached number one on the UK Singles Chart in 1988, as part of a double-A side with "With a Little Help from My Friends" by Wet Wet Wet. Both tracks were taken from the charity fundraising album Sgt. Pepper Knew My Father.
