= Leonard James Spencer =

British geologist

Leonard James Spencer CBE FRS (7 July 1870 – 14 April 1959) was a British geologist. He was an Honorary member of the Royal Geological Society of Cornwall, and also a recipient of its Bolitho Medal. He was president of the Mineralogical Society of Great Britain and Ireland from 1936 to 1939. In mineralogy, Spencer was an original investigator who described several new minerals, including miersite, tarbuttite and parahopeite. He also did important work as a curator, editor and bibliographer. He was the third person to receive the Roebling Medal, the highest award of the Mineralogical Society of America. In 1937, he was awarded the Murchison Medal of the Geological Society of London. He wrote at least 146 articles for the Encyclopædia Britannica Eleventh Edition.

His daughter, Penelope Spencer became a successful free-style dancer and choreographer.
