= Charlotte Sainton-Dolby =

English singer and composer (1821–1885)

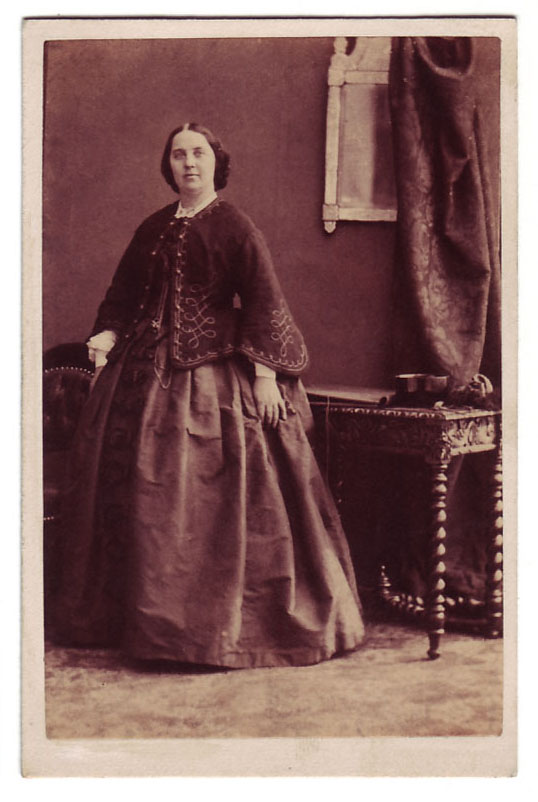
Charlotte Dolby, 1860

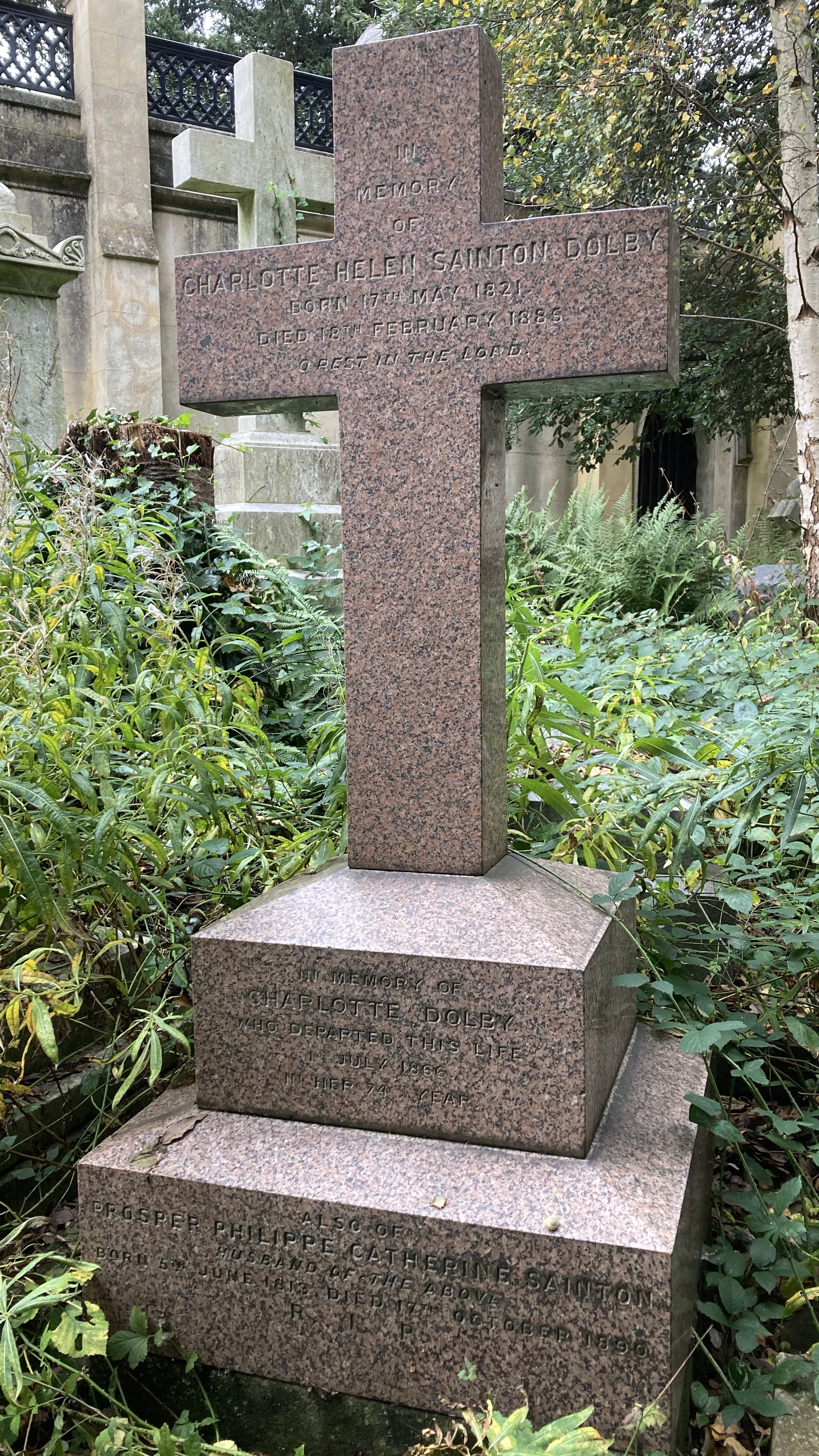
Grave of Charlotte Sainton-Dolby in Highgate Cemetery

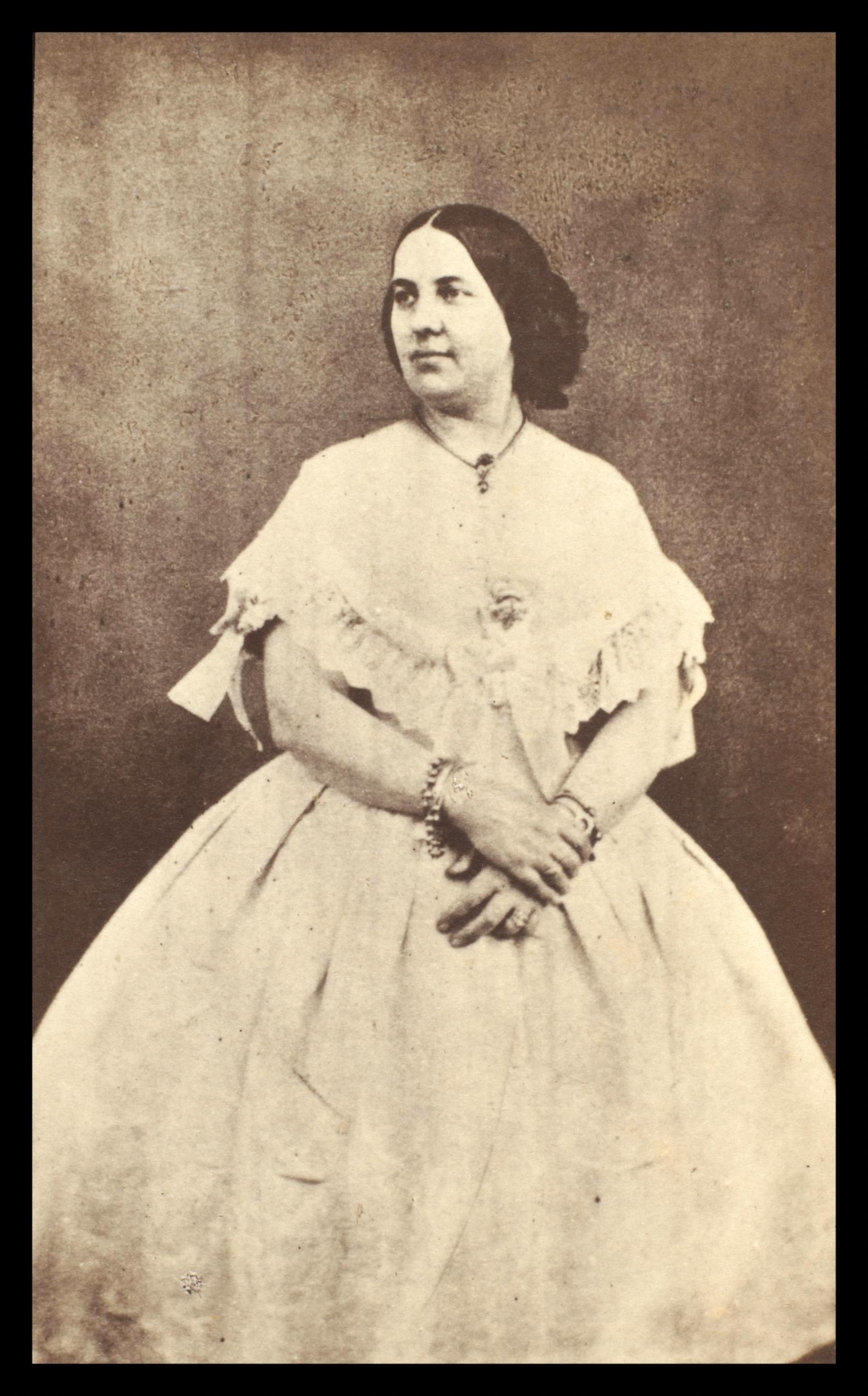
Charlotte Dolby by Henry Hering

Charlotte Helen Sainton-Dolby (17 May 1821 – 18 February 1885) was an English contralto, singing teacher and composer.

== Life ==
Charlotte Helen Dolby was born in London to Samuel Dolby and Charlotte Niven. Her father died when she was 10 years old. She studied at the Royal Academy of Music from 1832 to 1837, Domenico Crivelli being her principal singing-master. In 1837 she was elected to a King's scholarship, and first appeared at a Royal Philharmonic Society concert in 1841. In October 1845 she sang at the Gewandhaus, Leipzig, through the influence of Mendelssohn, who had been delighted by her singing in his oratorio St. Paul. The contralto music in his Elijah was written for her voice, but she did not appear in that work until the performance at Exeter Hall on 16 April 1847.

She was a principal soloist in the first English performance of Bach's St Matthew Passion, directed by William Sterndale Bennett at the Hanover Square Rooms London on 6 April 1854 and again for the premiere of his Sacred Cantata The Woman of Samaria at the Birmingham Musical Festival in 1867.

She married the violinist Prosper Sainton in 1860, and in 1870 she retired from the career of a public singer, but two years afterwards started a vocal academy in London. She made various successful attempts as a composer, and the cantatas The Legend of St Dorothea (1876), The Story of the Faithful Soul (1879), and Florimel (1885), enjoyed considerable success. Her last public appearance was at her husband's farewell concert in June 1883.

She died on the 18th February 1885 and was buried on the western side of Highgate Cemetery, near the Terrace Catacombs. A scholarship in her memory was founded at the Royal Academy of Music. Her voice was of moderate power and of fine quality, but it was her dignified and artistic style that gave her the high place she held for so many years both in oratorio and ballads.
