= Elizabeth Sharp (writer) =

British critic, editor, and writer (1856–1932)

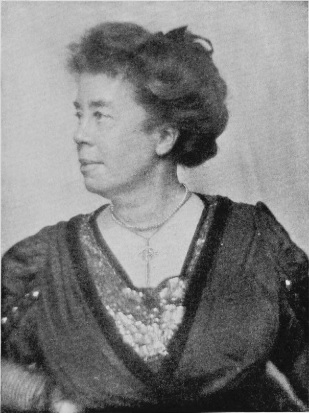
- Sharp in 1909
- Born: Elizabeth Sharp; 1856; London, England
- Died: 1932 (aged 75–76); London, England
- Occupations: critic, writer
- Spouse: William Sharp

Elizabeth Amelia Sharp (1856–1932) was a critic, editor and writer, and married to the Scottish writer, William Sharp also known by his pseudonym Fiona MacLeod. William Sharp (1855–1905) was her first cousin, his father David was a younger brother of Thomas, Elizabeth's father. They had no children.

== Life ==
Elizabeth was the daughter of Thomas Sharp and Agnes Farquharson, daughter of Robert Farquharson, sometime provost of Paisley. Her brother was Robert Farquharson Sharp (1864–1945) who became Keeper of Printed Books in the British Museum. In 1863, Elizabeth first met William when her mother brought her children on holiday from London to Blairmore on Gare Loch western Scotland. Elizabeth next met William in August 1875 when he spent a week with her family at Dunoon on the Clyde.

In September 1875, Elizabeth and her sister visited William's family in Glasgow and by the end of the month, Elizabeth and William were secretly engaged. In 1876, the two Sharp families rented houses on the Dunoon but this holiday finished in August of that year when William's father died. William left for Australia following fears for his health and returned to London in 1877. Elizabeth introduced him to her friends: Adelaide Elder and Mona Alison who later married James Alexander Henryson-Caird. In 1878, Elizabeth and William announced their engagement. In 1880, Elizabeth and her mother rented a holiday cottage in Port Maddock in northern Wales. William visited and caught a severe cold which became rheumatic fever. Elizabeth and her mother nursed him but over the course of their marriage Elizabeth would spend large parts nursing William.

In 1884, Elizabeth married William after a nine-year courtship. Elizabeth and William rented a flat at 46 Talgarth Road in West Kensington. They expanded their circle of literary and artistic friends, which would include William Morris and his wife Jane Burden, Oscar Wilde and his wife Constance Lloyd, Ford Madox Ford and his wife Elsie Martindale. By the end of 1884 Elizabeth and William embarked on a six-year stint of editing.

In 1885, Elizabeth and William travelled to Oxford first and then to Scotland where, in July, they rented a cottage at Loch Tarbert. In 1887, the Sharps moved from their West Kensington flat to a larger house in South Hampstead which they rented for three years and called Wescam. In late 1887, Elizabeth brought William to the Isle of Wight to recover from inflammation of the lungs. From 1888 the Sharps held Sunday evening 'at homes' for their literary and artistic circle at Wescam. In August 1888, Elizabeth and William went to Scotland for nearly three months visiting family. In July 1889 Elizabeth accompanied Mona Caird to Valdes in the Carpathian mountains.

In the summer of 1890, Elizabeth visited a friend in South Bantaskine and then met William in North Queensferry to travel to Aberdeen and back to Edinburgh to meet family. In October 1890, Elizabeth and William went to Heidelberg for six weeks and then to Italy for the winter staying first with Elizabeth's aunt, Mrs Smiley, who had a villa near Florence and then to Rome staying until early March 1891. By 1890 Elizabeth's and William's marriage had devolved to that of a mother looking after a child. In Rome, William began a relationship with Edith Wingate Rinder which last until his death. Elizabeth acknowledges the relationship and the effect it had on her husband's creativity partially prompting the creation of 'Fiona MacLeod' in her Memoir. Upon leaving Rome they travelled to Provence where Elizabeth stayed until mid-1891, leaving only when she became ill with a low fever, identified as malaria, and returning to Eastbourne. In late 1891, Elizabeth and William visited Stuttgart so William could collaborate with Blanche Willis Howard.

In early 1892, the Sharps had moved to 11 Bedford Gardens in Kensington where Elizabeth had a studio for painting however by mid-April William had left for Paris and Elizabeth remained in England. Elizabeth joined William in Paris in early May by which time Edith Wingate Rinder had left. In June 1892, while staying with Mona Caird Elizabeth had a malaria relapse and William travelled to Bucks Green, Sussex to secure a cottage where they would stay for the next two years. They named the house 'Phenice Croft' combining the Greek name for a 'phoenix' with the Scottish word for 'cottage.' During July 1892 Elizabeth travelled to Bayreuth for the Wagner festival. In late 1893 because of Elizabeth's relapses from malaria, the Sharps travelled to Italy and North Africa returning in February 1893. In May 1893, Elizabeth travelled to Paris to review the art salon for the Glasgow Herald and at the end of July both Sharps went to St Andrews and Perthshire in Scotland. From the summer of 1893 Elizabeth spent more time in London with her mother as Elizabeth attributed her continuing health problems to the moist air and clay soil of Bucks Green and having to regularly travel to London for her art critic commitments. It's likely with Elizabeth in London that Edith Wingate Rinder spent these periods at Bucks Green.[11] At this time William also undertook psychic experiments and Elizabeth felt they had a negative impact on his mental health.

From 1894 the Sharps rented a flat at Kensington Court Gardens where Elizabeth lived while William travelled between London and Bucks Green. In late 1894, the Sharps let the Bucks Green house go. In the summer of 1894, Elizabeth and William spent six weeks in Scotland visiting Oban, the Isle of Mull and Iona.

In 1895, Elizabeth and William intended to spend part of the summer in Edinburgh at Patrick Geddes Summer School where William would give a series of lectures. However, William had an attack of angina and the majority of the lectures were never delivered. William left for Kinghorn to recuperate while Elizabeth remained in Edinburgh keeping opening house for the students. In 1896, both Elizabeth and William contributed to Patrick Geddes' The Evergreen: A Northern Seasonal. Elizabeth and Patrick had concerns about William's health and at this point Patrick offered him salaried work with his publishing company. In 1896, Patrick Geddes published Lyra Celtica: An Anthology of Representative Celtic Poetry as part of his 'Celtic Library' series. Later that year on orders from her doctor Elizabeth left to spend three months in a warm climate in Italy. Elizabeth travelled with William as far as Paris, met her aunt in Florence and then met Mona Caird in Rome. By mid-1896 Elizabeth and Edith were in agreement about William's health and agreed that one or the other of them, or a suitable substitute should always be present with him. Towards the end of 1896 Elizabeth and William became godparents to Patrick Geddes' son Arthur Allhallows Geddes.

In 1897, Elizabeth met some members of the Félibrige: Felix Gras, Frederic Mistral and Marie Josephine Gasquet (b.1872) and author of Une Fille de Saint François (1922), Une Enfance Provençale (1926–41), Sainte Jeanne d’Arc (1929), and La Fête-Dieu (1932). Mistral had co-founded the Félibrige some years earlier in an effort to preserve Provençal culture.

By 1898, Elizabeth was focused on her work as an art critic and on restoring her husband's physical and mental health. Throughout the Memoir she never revealed concerns about the extent of Edith's relationship with William but welcomed her co-operation in stabilising his health. William and Elizabeth decided to go in August and September 1899 to the east coast of Ireland as it was less expensive than the west coast. Before they left for Ireland they gave up their South Hampstead flat at 30 Greencroft Gardens.

In 1900, Elizabeth was beset by both bronchitis and rheumatism, which was followed by sciatica. In 1901, Elizabeth and William visited Palermo and Taormina. In 1902, Elizabeth was obliged to give up her work as an art critic, despite the income that it brought in, as William was sick.

In November 1904, Elizabeth and William visited America and Carolyn Hazard, President of Wellesley College, arranged for Elizabeth Sharp to tour Wellesley and Radcliffe College, and for both Sharps to call on Julia Ward Howe and to visit Fen Hall to see Isabella Stewart Gardner's collection. Fen Hall is now known as Fenway Court and is the Isabella Stewart Gardner Museum. This was Elizabeth's first visit to the US.

In December 1905, William died while staying with Elizabeth and their friend Alexander Nelson Hood at his Castello di Maniace near Mount Etna in Sicily. After William's death in 1905, Elizabeth consulted mediums and left a record of her communications with his spirit.

Elizabeth became literary executor of William's estate after his death. After his death Elizabeth compiled and arranged many of William's works under a uniform title of 'Selected Writings of William Sharp.' This five-volume set comprised Poems, Critical Essays, Papers (covering two volumes) and Vistas. The title page describes these books as 'selected and arranged by Mrs William Sharp.' In these volumes, Elizabeth wrote a preface discussing the contents of each volume and the selection choices made.

When Elizabeth died in 1932, she left instructions for two packages to be destroyed which they were. These may have included William's Golden Dawn diaries or letters between William and Edith Wingate Rinder.

== Writer ==
Elizabeth Sharp published books on poetry, art and music history, and translated Heine. Elizabeth and William collaborated to some extent, most notably on Lyra Celtica: An Anthology of Representative Celtic Poetry. Lyra Celtica is an anthology of poetry from all the Celtic nations. It includes ancient Scottish, Irish, Cornish, Manx and Breton poems as well as works by contemporary Scottish and Irish poets including Fiona MacLeod, Katharine Tynan, WB Yeats, Bliss Carman, Villiers de I'Isle-Adam and Arthur Quiller Couch.

Elizabeth contributed significantly to the selection and arrangement of sonnets in William's book Sonnets of This Century (1886). In 1887, Elizabeth assisted William when he took over the editor of 'The Literary Chair' in The Young Folk's Paper.

In 1890, William transferred the post of London-based art critic for the Glasgow Herald to Elizabeth. In 1899, Elizabeth was also an art critic for a London newspaper.

In 1892, J Stanley Little wrote a favourable review of Elizabeth's translation of Heine: "She has absorbed Heine and given him back etc."

In 1896, Elizabeth contributed to Patrick Geddes' The Evergreen: A Northern Seasonal.

== Published works ==
- Women's Voices: An Anthology of the Most Characteristic Poems by English, Scotch and Irish Women (1887)
- Letters on the French Stage
- Sea-Music: An Anthology of Poems and Passages Descriptive of the Sea (1887)
- Songs and Poems of the Sea. Sea Music. Edited by Mrs. W. Sharp. (1888)
- Women Poets of the Victorian Era. Edited, with an introduction and notes, by Mrs. William Sharp in 'Canterbury Poets' series. (1890)
- Italian Travel Sketches. Translated by Elizabeth A. Sharp, from the original with prefatory note from the French of Théophile Gautier (1892)
- Lyra Celtica: An Anthology of Representative Celtic Poetry. Introduction & notes by William Sharp. (1896)
- A History of Music in the 19th Century (1902)
- Rembrandt ... With forty illustrations (1904)
- William Sharp / Fiona Macleod: A Memoir (1910)
- a revised and enlarged edition of Lyra Celtica with Jessie Mathay (1924).

== Works selected and arranged ==
- Progress of Art in the Century by William Sharp and Elizabeth Amelia Sharp. (1906)
- From the Hills of Dream: Thronodies, Songs and Later Poems. Edited by Elizabeth A. Sharp. (1907)
- A Little Book of Nature. Selected by Mrs. William Sharp and Roselle Lathrop Shields. (1909)
- The Writings of Fiona Macleod. Uniform edition, arranged by Mrs. William Sharp. (1909-1910)
- Poems by William Sharp. Selected and Arranged by Mrs William Sharp (1912)
- Papers Critical & Reminiscent by William Sharp. Selected and Arranged by Mrs William Sharp (1912)
- Vistas. The Gypsy Christ and Other Prose Imaginings by William Sharp. Selected and Arranged by Mrs William Sharp (1912)
- The Silence of Amor; Where the Forest Mumurs by Fiona MacLeod (William Sharp); Arranged by Mrs. William Sharp (1919)
- The Laughter of Peterkin: A Retelling of Old Tales of the Celtic Underworld. Arranged by Mrs. W. Sharp. (1927)
