= William Sharp (writer) =

Scottish writer (1855–1905)

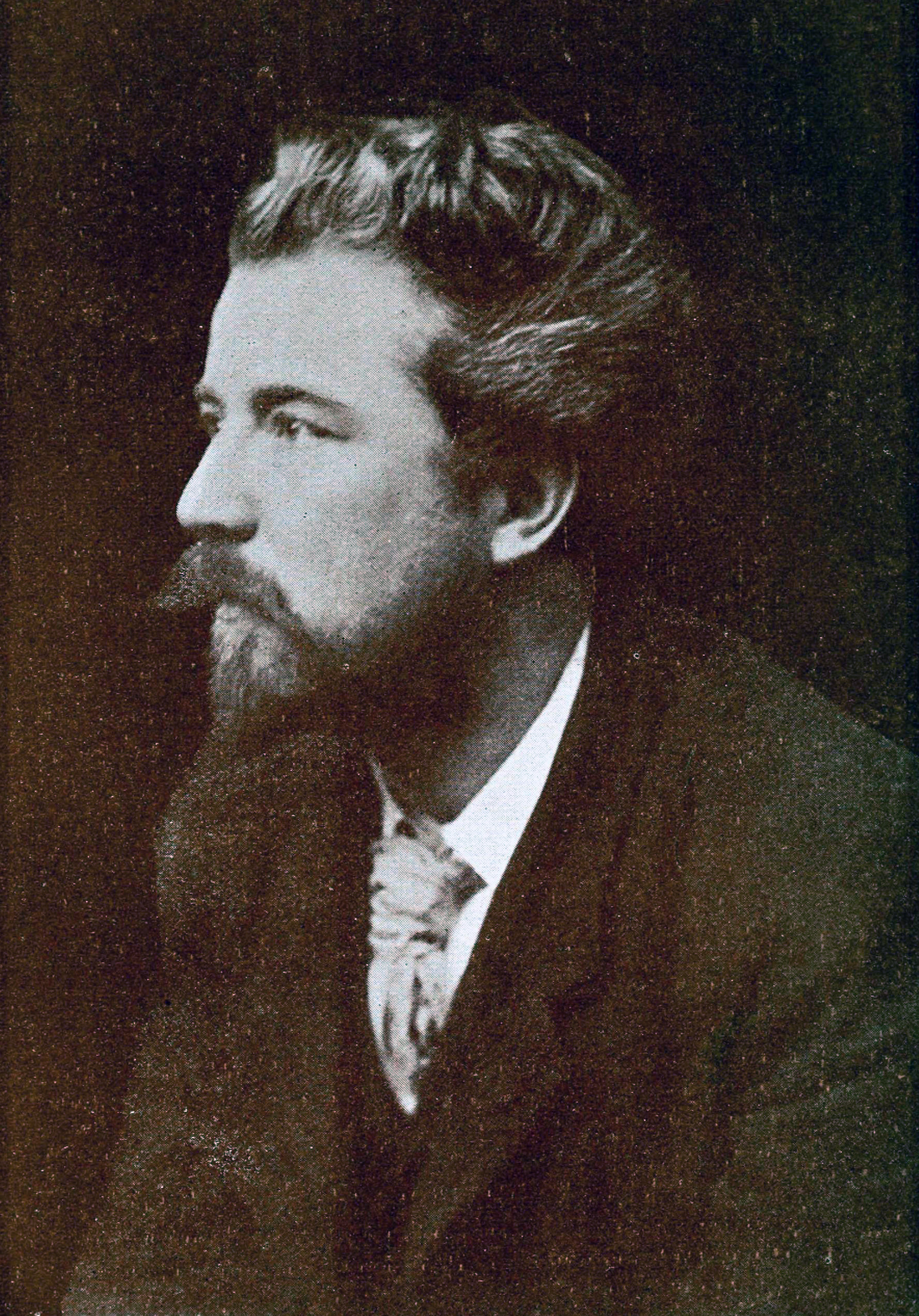
- Sharp in 1894
- Born: 12 September 1855; Paisley, Scotland
- Died: 12 December 1905 (aged 50); Bronte, Sicily
- Other name: Fiona Macleod
- Occupation: Writer
- Spouse: Elizabeth Sharp

William Sharp (12 September 1855 – 12 December 1905) was a Scottish writer, of poetry and literary biography in particular, who from 1893 wrote also as Fiona Macleod, a pseudonym kept almost secret during his lifetime. He was also an editor of the poetry of Ossian, Walter Scott, Matthew Arnold, Algernon Charles Swinburne and Eugene Lee-Hamilton.

== Early life ==
Sharp was born in Paisley and educated at Glasgow Academy and the University of Glasgow, which he attended 1871–1872 without completing a degree. In 1872 he contracted typhoid. During 1874–5 he worked in a Glasgow law office. His health broke down in 1876 and he was sent on a voyage to Australia. In 1878 he took a position in a bank in London.

== Career ==
He was introduced to Dante Gabriel Rossetti by Sir Noel Paton, and joined the Rossetti literary group; which included Hall Caine, Philip Bourke Marston and Swinburne. He married his cousin Elizabeth Sharp in 1884, and devoted himself to writing full-time from 1891, travelling widely.

Also about this time, he developed an intensely romantic attachment to Edith Wingate Rinder, another writer of the consciously Celtic Edinburgh circle surrounding Patrick Geddes and "The Evergreen". It was to Rinder ("EWR") he attributed the inspiration for his writings as "Fiona Macleod" thereafter, and to whom he dedicated his first Macleod novel ("Pharais") in 1894. Sharp had a complex and ambivalent relationship with W. B. Yeats during the 1890s, as a central tension in the Celtic Revival. Yeats initially found Macleod acceptable and Sharp not, and later fathomed their identity. Sharp found the dual personality an increasing strain.

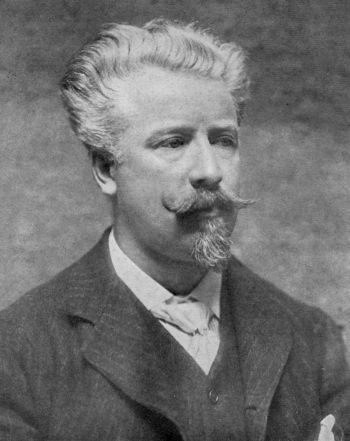

On occasions when it was necessary for "Fiona Macleod" to write to someone unaware of the dual identity, Sharp would dictate the text to his sister (Mary Beatrice Sharp), whose handwriting would then be passed off as Fiona's manuscript.

=== Hermeticism ===
During his Macleod period, Sharp was a member of the Hermetic Order of the Golden Dawn. In August 1892, he published what became the only issue of the Pagan Review, in which he, under a set of pen names (including "W. H. Brooks", "W. S. Fanshawe", "George Gascoigne", "Willand Dreeme", "Lionel Wingrave", "James Marazion", "Charles Verleyne", and "Wm. Windover") argued for the establishment of a neo-paganism which would abolish gender inequality. The review was received negatively; among other things, critics wrote that its paganism was far removed from the pagan writings of the ancient world. The Saturday Review wrote:

There can be no better cure for the errors of Neo-paganism than a study of the old pagans, Homer, Sophocles, Virgil. They, not M. Paul Verlaine, not even Mr. George Meredith, not even Beaudelaire (as the Pagan Review calls that author, who himself smote the Neo-Pagans in a memorable essay) are the guides to follow.

== Death ==
He died in 1905 at the Castello di Maniace near Bronte, in Sicily, where he was the guest of Sir Alexander Nelson Hood, 5th Duke of Bronté (1904–1937), and was buried there in the ducal cemetery. He described the duchy and aspects of its history in his Attraverso la Ducea Nelson.

In 1910, Elizabeth Sharp published a biographical memoir attempting to explain the creative necessity behind the deception, and edited a complete edition of his works.

== The Belgian Revival ==
Sharp took an early interest in the Belgian avant-garde and disseminated knowledge of La Jeune Belgique movement in a number of essays published in English-language literary periodicals, including two essays entitled La Jeune Belgique, a biographical and critical essay titled Maeterlinck, a reflection on Ruysbroeck and Maeterlinck and a review of Gérard Harry's production of Princess Maleine and The Intruder (1892). He translated Auguste Jenart's The Barbarian (1891) into English. His translation of Charles van Lerberghe's Les Flaireurs was published as The Night-Comers in The Evergreen: A Northern Seasonal: Autumn in 1895.

== Musical settings ==
The poems of Fiona Macleod attracted the attention of composers in the first half of the 20th century as part of the Celtic Twilight movement in the UK and the US. By far the best known setting was the adaptation of the verse drama The Immortal Hour as the libretto for Rutland Boughton's hugely successful opera of the same name, completed in 1914. The opera ran in London for 216 consecutive performances in 1922, and for a further 160 performances the following year, and was staged in New York City in 1926. It was revived at the Sadler's Wells Theatre in London in 1953. The first recording of the complete work, sponsored by The Rutland Boughton Trust, took place in 1983 and was released the following year by Hyperion Records on CD and as a boxed vinyl set.

Other musical settings include:

- Samuel Barber: Two Poems of the Wind (1924)
- Arnold Bax: A Celtic Song Cycle, (1904) and other songs
- Rutland Boughton: Five Celtic Songs (1910)
- Frederick Delius: I-Brasil, (1913)
- Christopher Edmunds: Kye-Song Of Saint Bride for soprano, chorus and orchestra (1951)
- John Foulds: Five Mood Pictures (1917)
- Norman Fulton: Three Songs of Fiona McLeod (1962)
- Charles T. Griffes: Three Poems of Fiona MacLeod (1918)
- Fritz Hart: four volumes of Five Songs, opp. 73 to 77
- Helen Hopekirk: Six Poems by Fiona Macleod (1907) and other songs
- Herbert Howells: Five Songs for Low Voice and Piano
- David Moule-Evans: Two Celtic Songs (1945)
- Philip Sainton: Leaves, Shadows and Dreams
- Caroline Holme Walker: When the Dew is Falling

== Works ==
- Dante Gabriel Rossetti: A Record and Study (1882)
- The Human Inheritance, The New Hope, Motherhood and Other Poems (1882)
- Sopistra and Other Poems (1884);
- Earth's Voices (1884) poems
- Sonnets of this century (1886) editor
- Sea-Music: An Anthology of Poems (1887)
- Life of Percy Bysshe Shelley (1887)
- Romantic Ballads and Poems of Phantasy (1888)
- Sport of chance (1888) novel
- Life of Heinrich Heine (1888)
- American Sonnets (1889)
- Life of Robert Browning (1889)
- The Children of Tomorrow (1889)
- Sospiri di Roma (1891) poems
- Life of Joseph Severn (1892)
- A Fellowe and his Wife (1892)
- Flower o' the Vine (1892)
- The Pagan Review (1892)
- Vistas (1894);
- Pharais (1894) novel as FM
- The Gypsy Christ and Other Tales (1895)
- Mountain Lovers (1895) novel as FM
- The Laughter of Peterkin (1895) as FM
- The Sin-Eater and Other Tales (1895) as FM
- Ecce puella and Other Prose Imaginings (1896)
- Green Fire: A Romance (1896) novel as FM
- The Washer of the Ford (1896) novel as FM
- Fair Women in Painting and Poetry (1896)
- Lyra Celtica: An Anthology of Representative Celtic Poetry (1896)
- The Immortal Hour, play (1899) as FM
- By Sundown Shores (1900) as FM
- The Divine Adventure (1900) as FM
- Iona (1900) as FM
- Atalanta in Calydon: and lyrical poems (1901)
- From the Hills of Dream, Threnodies Songs and Later Poems (1901) as FM; this included the poem "The Lonely Hunter", which contains perhaps MacLeod's most famous line: Deep in the heart of Summer, sweet is life to me still, But my heart is a lonely hunter that hunts on a lonely hill. This inspired the title of Carson McCullers' debut novel The Heart Is a Lonely Hunter
- The Progress of Art in the Nineteenth century (1902)
- Wind and wave: selected tales (1902)
- The House of Usna (1903) play as FM
- Literary Geography (1904)
- The Winged Destiny: Studies in the Spiritual History of the Gael (1904) as FM and dedicated to Dr John Goodchild
- Where the forest murmurs: Nature essays (1906) as FM
- The Immortal Hour (1908) play as FM
- Selected writings (1912) 5 Vols.
- The Hills of Ruel, and Other Stories (1921) as FM
