= The Immortal Hour =

Opera by Rutland Boughton

- Opera by Rutland Boughton
- Librettist: Boughton
- Premiere: 26 August 1914; Glastonbury Festival

The Immortal Hour is an opera by English composer Rutland Boughton. Boughton adapted his own libretto from the play of the same name by Fiona MacLeod, a pseudonym of writer William Sharp.

The Immortal Hour is a fairy tale or fairy opera, with a mood and theme similar to Dvořák's Rusalka and Mozart's The Magic Flute. Magic and nature spirits play important roles in the storyline. The fairy people are not mischievous, childlike sprites, but are proud and powerful: immortal demigods who are feared by mortals and who can (and do) interfere with the lives of men and women. Alternatively, the progression of Etain into the mortal realm and her pursuit and redemption by Midir have similarities with the legend of Orpheus and Eurydice.

In this work, completed in December of 1913, Boughton combined Wagnerian approaches to musical themes and symbolism with a folk-like modal approach to the music itself, reflective of the Celtic origins of the tale, which is based on the Irish story Tochmarc Étaíne.

== Performance history ==
The Immortal Hour was first performed in Glastonbury on 26 August 1914, at the inaugural Glastonbury Festival which Boughton co-founded. Boughton himself sang Dalua, replacing a singer who had fallen sick. In 1921, Penelope Spencer was engaged by Boughton to stage dances and choruses for the Glastonbury Festival, some of which he incorporated into this opera. It was first performed with orchestra (as against piano) at the Winter Gardens 7-9 January 1915.

The opera ran in London for 216 consecutive performances in 1922, and for a further 160 performances the following year, and was staged in New York City in 1926.

It was revived at the Sadler's Wells Theatre in London in 1953. The first recording of the complete work, sponsored by The Rutland Boughton Trust, took place in 1983 and was released the following year by Hyperion Records (CDD22040) on CD and as a boxed vinyl set.

== Reception ==
Dame Ethel Smyth in 1922 said "The Immortal Hour enchants me. The whole thing gripped me". In 1924, Sir Edward Elgar described the opera as "a work of genius".

Speaking in 1949, Sir Arthur Bliss said "I remember vividly how Boughton made his characters live, and the masterly effect of the choral writing". The same year, Ralph Vaughan Williams opined that "In any other country, such a work as The Immortal Hour would have been in the repertoire years ago".

== Roles ==
Role	Voice type	Premiere Cast, 26 August 1914 (Conductor: Charles Kennedy Scott)
Eochaidh, the heroic king	baritone	Frederic Austin
Etain, the faery princess who is eternally fair and youthful	soprano	Irene Lemon
Dalua, the Lord of Shadow	bass	Rutland Boughton
Midir, Etain's eternal lover	tenor	Arthur Jordan
Manus, a peasant	bass	Neville Strutt
Maive, Manus's wife	mezzo-soprano	Agnes Thomas
Spirit voice	mezzo-soprano	Muriel Boughton
Old bard	bass	Arthur Trowbridge

== Synopsis ==
=== Act 1 ===
Dalua, the Lord of Shadow, is seen in a dark and mysterious wood. He is known as the Amadan-Dhu, the Faery Fool, the Dark One, and is an agent of unseen and fateful powers, whose touch brings madness and death to mortals. He has come there under some compulsion, following visions, but does not know for what purpose. He is mocked by invisible spirits of the woods, who recognise him as an outcast, feared even by the gods themselves. He ripostes that he is the instrument of powers beyond even the gods, and bids the voices be silent. A woman's voice is heard and Etain enters the clearing, looking bewildered and singing about the wonderful place she came from, where death is only a "drifting shadow" and where the Faery folk - the Shee - hold court. She resolves to return but is waylaid by Dalua. As he touches her with a shadow she forgets all of where she came from barring her name. Dalua realises that the reason for their meeting is now clear to him; a mortal king has sought immortal love and is led towards them under similar compulsion to theirs. He bids Etain to go and awaits the king. Eochaidh, who is High King of Eiré, enters and is welcomed by Dalua. Dalua shows him visions of the legendary Fount of Beauty which the king has pursued in dreams. Spirit voices warn Eochaidh to return to his people, but by then he is under Dalua's spell and follows him blindly into the wood.

In a hut, the peasant Manus and his wife Maive sit with Etain, who is sheltering from a stormy night. A stranger - Dalua - has given them gold for Etain's accommodation and for their silence. They are nervous not just from the storm but from fear of the Faery folk, whom they avoid talking of or even naming. When Eochaidh appears and asks for shelter, they are terrified, especially as he has been out in the storm but is not even damp! He assures them he is mortal just like them, but then sees Etain and forgets everything else. Etain and Eochaidh sing a love duet, interrupted by a mocking laugh from outside. Etain tells him it was an owl. As they sit together, the faint voices of the Faeries can be heard singing.

=== Act 2 ===
A year has passed in Eochaidh's court, and he has called a celebration for the anniversary of his winning of Etain. Choruses of druids, maidens, bards and warriors sing and raise toasts to the royal couple. In the middle of this, Etain announces that she is weary and has been troubled by strange dreams. She bids them goodnight. Eochaidh admits that he too has had unsettling dreams, in which he saw the Faeries marching, beautiful, powerful and frightening. He begs her not to go but she insists. As soon as she has retired to her room, a stranger appears at the door - Midir, Etain's immortal lover, disguised as a harpist. He is welcomed warily by Eochaidh, who is upset when the stranger will not give his name. Midir asks a favour of the king and Eochaidh assents. He is unhappy when he learns it is to kiss the queen's hand and serenade her with a song, but his word was given so Etain is roused. Midir sings the Faery song heard at the end of Act I. Etain, awakened to her immortal origins, leaves with Midir to the sounds of a Faery chorus. Only the heartbroken king remains, and as he begs for his dreams back, Dalua steps in and touches him soundlessly. He collapses, dead.

== "How beautiful they are" ==
The song "How beautiful they are" appears first in a chorus by unseen spirits, then is reprised by Midir of the "Shee" (Tuatha Dé Danann) as a solo aria accompanied by a harp.

The song is featured in the Adam Curtis documentary "Can't get you out of my head", with the fifth episode named "The lordly ones", from a line in the song.

== See also ==
- The Immortal Hour (play)
