= Glastonbury Festival (1914–1925) =

Series of cultural events in Glastonbury, England

The first Glastonbury Festivals, most notable for being the forerunners of Glastonbury Festival, were a series of cultural events founded by communist activist and composer Rutland Boughton, which were held in summer from 1914 to 1925 in Glastonbury, Somerset, England.

Despite being an initial success, public support and financing for the festivals was lost after Boughton joined the Communist Party of Great Britain (CPGB), supported the miners during the 1926 United Kingdom general strike, and performed a nativity opera (Bethlehem) depicting Jesus as the son of a miner and King Herod as a capitalist.

== History ==
The festivals were founded by English socialist composer Rutland Boughton and his librettist Reginald Buckley. Apart from the founding of a national theatre, Boughton and Buckley envisaged a summer school and music festival based on utopian principles. This was inspired at least in part by the concept of the "temple theatre" first proposed by Richard Wagner and its corresponding festival, Bayreuth: a place for the common people to congregate around art. With strong Arthurian connections and historic and prehistoric associations, Glastonbury was chosen to host the festivals. At the turn of the century one of the earliest New Age communities had already established itself in the area. The agricultural setting was also considered an asset as Boughton and Buckley felt that "real art can only grow out of real life."

Among the supporters were Sir Edward Elgar and George Bernard Shaw, while financial support was received from the Clark family, shoemakers in nearby Street. The first festival included the premiere performance of Boughton's opera The Immortal Hour. By the time the festivals ended in 1926, 350 staged works had been performed, as well as a programme of chamber music, lectures and recitals.

In 1924 the festival hosted the première of Boughton’s musical setting of Thomas Hardy’s play The Queen of Cornwall. Hardy was present at the première, and was said to be "pleased".

=== Demise ===
The festivals ended ignominiously when Boughton's backers withdrew funds following a scandalous production of his Nativity opera Bethlehem in London. In sympathy with the miners and the ongoing General Strike, the production had Jesus born in a miner's cottage with King Herod as a top-hatted capitalist and his soldiers in police uniforms. The demise of the festival was also hastened once it became public knowledge that Boughton had joined the Communist Party of Great Britain (CPGB), losing him the support of many wealthy supporters.
