= Rutland Boughton =

British composer (1878–1960)

Rutland Boughton (23 January 1878 – 25 January 1960) was an English composer who became well known in the early 20th century as a composer of opera and choral music. He was also an influential communist activist within the Communist Party of Great Britain (CPGB).

His oeuvre includes three symphonies, several concertos, part-songs, songs, chamber music and opera (which he called "music drama" after Wagner). His best known work was the opera The Immortal Hour. His Bethlehem (1915), based on the Coventry Nativity Play and notable for its choral arrangements of traditional Christmas carols, also became very popular with choral societies worldwide.

Among his many works, the prolific Boughton composed a complete series of five operas of Arthurian mythos, written over a period of thirty-five years: The Birth of Arthur (1909), The Round Table (1915–16), The Lily Maid (1933–34), Galahad (1943–44) and Avalon (1944–45). Other operas by Boughton include The Moon Maiden (1918); Alkestis (1920–22); and The Ever Young (1928–29).

Through the Boughton Trust (see below), many of his major works have been recorded and are available on disc including The Immortal Hour, Bethlehem, Symphony No 1 Oliver Cromwell, Symphony No 2 Deirdre, Symphony No 3, Oboe Concerto No 1, string quartets and various chamber pieces and songs.

In addition to his compositions, Boughton is remembered for his attempt to create an "English Bayreuth" at Glastonbury, establishing the first series of Glastonbury Festivals. They ran with enormous success from 1914 until 1926 when support for his musical activities dried up after he joined the CPGB.

== Biography ==
Rutland Boughton was the son of grocer William Boughton (1841–1905) whose shop was situated in Buckingham Street in the town of Aylesbury, Buckinghamshire, and his wife Grace Martha Bishop. From an early age he showed signs of exceptional talent for music although formal training opportunities did not immediately become available to him. In 1892, after leaving school at the age of 14, he was apprenticed to a London concert agency and six years later he attracted the attention of several influential musicians including MP Ferdinand de Rothschild of the Rothschild family which enabled him to raise sufficient monies to study at the Royal College of Music in London.

As a committed socialist, Boughton's early influences included William Morris, John Ruskin, George Bernard Shaw, and Edward Carpenter, the last of which with whom he developed a lifelong relationship.

While at RCM, Boughton studied under Charles Villiers Stanford and Walford Davies from 1898 to 1901. He later took up ad hoc work first in the pit of the Haymarket Theatre then as official accompanist to the baritone David Ffrangcon-Davies (whose daughter, Gwen, later became associated with the Glastonbury Festivals in her famous role Etain in The Immortal Hour). In 1903, he married former Aylesbury neighbour's daughter, Florence Hobley; he lived to regret the marriage. It was in 1905 (the year he completed his first symphony Oliver Cromwell) that he was approached by Sir Granville Bantock to become a member of staff at the Birmingham and Midland Institute of Music (now the Royal Birmingham Conservatoire).

=== Birmingham and Midland Institute of Music ===
It was while at Birmingham (1905 to 1911) that Boughton was presented with many new opportunities and made many friends. He proved an excellent teacher and an outstanding choral conductor which won him much recognition. It was also during those years that he became attached to the young art student, Christina Walshe, who was later to become his partner and artistic "right-hand man" for his Glastonbury projects. His friendship with Shaw had begun when Boughton had been turned down from his invitation to collaborate on an opera. Shaw initially refused to be associated with any of Boughton's music but Boughton would not be dissuaded and eventually Shaw realised they had something in common that was to endure.

Out of his process of self-discovery and self-education came the artistic aims that were to occupy Boughton for all his life. As a young man, he planned a fourteen-day cycle of dramas on the life of Christ in which the story would be enacted on a small stage in the middle of an orchestra while soloists and the chorus would comment on the action. Although this did not come to anything, the idea remained with him and by 1907 Boughton's discovery of the theories and practices of Richard Wagner, combined with his impression that the church's vision of Christianity had somewhat failed, resulted in another subject – King Arthur.

Based upon the Ring Cycle at Bayreuth, and parallel to the ideas of the young poet Reginald Buckley in his book "Arthur of Britain", Boughton set out to create a new form of opera which he later called "choral drama". At this point, the three collaborators – Boughton, Buckley and Walshe – sought to establish a national festival of drama. Whilst London's Covent Garden was ideal for the established operatic repertoire, it would not prove to be so for the plans that Boughton and Buckley had and eventually they decided that they should build their own theatre and, using local talent, set up a form of commune or cooperative.

At first Letchworth Garden City in Hertfordshire was deemed a suitable location for the project (the Arts and Crafts Movement was significant at that time) but they later turned to the Somerset town of Glastonbury, the alleged resting place of King Arthur and in an area steeped in legend. Meanwhile, Sir Dan Godfrey and his Bournemouth orchestra had established a reputation for supporting new English music and it was here where Boughton's first opera from the Arthurian cycle, The Birth of Arthur, received its first performance. It was also at Bournemouth where Boughton's 2nd Symphony had a first hearing and The Queen of Cornwall was performed for the first time using an orchestra, and attended by Thomas Hardy on whose poem the opera was based.

=== Glastonbury ===
By 1911, Boughton had resigned from Birmingham and moved to Glastonbury where, together with Walshe and Buckley, he began to focus on establishing the country's first national annual summer school of music. The first production was not the projected Arthurian Cycle but that of Boughton's new choral-drama, The Immortal Hour, composed in 1912, which with a national appeal to raise funds was produced with the full backing of Sir Granville Bantock, Thomas Beecham, John Galsworthy, Eugene Goossens, Gustav Holst, Dame Ethel Smyth and Shaw and others. Sir Edward Elgar promised to lay the foundation stone and Beecham to lend his London orchestra. However, in August 1914, the month set for the opening of the first production, World War 1 had been declared and the full plans had to be postponed. Boughton, however, was determined to proceed and the Festival began and in place of Beecham's orchestra, he used a grand piano and instead of a theatre, the local Assembly Rooms that were to remain the centre of activities until the end of the Festivals in 1926, by which time Boughton had mounted over 350 staged works, 100 chamber concerts, a number of exhibitions and a series of lectures and recitals – something never previously witnessed in England. In 1922, Boughton's Festival Players went on tour and became established at Bristol in the Folk Festival House (now demolished) and at Bournemouth.

From 1911, Boughton also worked as a music critic, initially for the Daily Citizen and Daily Herald, and in later years, for the Sunday Worker.

The most notable and most successful of Boughton's works is the opera The Immortal Hour, an adaptation of the play by Fiona Macleod (the pseudonym of William Sharp) based on Celtic mythology. Having been successful in Glastonbury and well received in Birmingham, the director of the then new Birmingham Repertory Theatre, Barry Jackson, decided to take the Glastonbury Festival Players' production to London where it achieved the record breaking run of over 600 performances. On its arrival at the Regent Theatre in 1922, it secured an initial run of over 200 consecutive performances and a further 160 in 1923, with a highly successful revival in 1932. People came to see the opera on more than one occasion (including members of the royal family) and especially to see and hear the young Gwen Ffrangcon-Davies whose portrayal as Etain began her professional acting career.

In addition to The Immortal Hour and Bethlehem, his other operas The Queen of Cornwall (1924) based on Thomas Hardy's play, and Alkestis (1922) based on Gilbert Murray's translation of the Greek play Alcestis, by Euripides (which was performed at Covent Garden by the British National Opera Company and was broadcast by the nascent British Broadcasting Company, both in 1924), were also very well received. These latter works have not been publicly heard since the mid-1960s when the original Boughton Trust, organised by Adolph Borsdorf, sponsored professional concert performances in London and Street in Somerset.

=== Demise of Glastonbury Festival ===
The downfall of the Glastonbury Festivals was hastened when Boughton, sympathising with the miners' lock-out and general strike of 1926, insisted on staging his very popular Nativity opera Bethlehem (1915) at Church House, Westminster, London, with Jesus born in a miner's cottage and Herod as a top-hatted capitalist, flanked by soldiers and police. This play was heavily attacked by the Daily Mail, provoking a "hue and cry". Boughton also joined the Communist Party of Great Britain (CPGB) and let the details of his membership be widely known. These event caused much embarrassment to the people of Glastonbury who withdrew their support from Boughton, causing the Festival Players to go into liquidation.

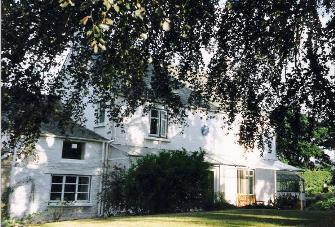
Beavans Hill, Kilcot

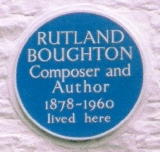
Commemoration plaque at Kilcot

=== Later life ===
From 1927 until his death in 1960, Boughton lived at Kilcot, near Newent in Gloucestershire where he completed the last two operas of his Arthurian cycle (Avalon and Galahad, which to this day have not been performed) and produced some of his finest works, the quality of which has only been realised within the past twenty years. These include his 2nd and 3rd symphonies (the latter was first performed at the London Kingsway Theatre in 1939 in the presence of, among others, Ralph Vaughan Williams, Clarence Raybould and Alan Bush), a number of pieces for oboe (including two concertos, one dedicated to his talented daughter Joy Boughton and the other to Léon Goossens), chamber music and a number of orchestral pieces. In 1934 and 1935, Boughton attempted to repeat his earlier successes at Glastonbury with festivals commissioned at Stroud and Bath, and these saw the release of new works, The Lily Maid (the third opera in the Arthurian Cycle) and The Ever Young. Boughton's reputation was, however, affected by his political leanings towards Communism, and his music was subsequently neglected for the next forty years. In 1956 Boughton left the Communist Party of Great Britain, although he remained a committed socialist for the remainder of his life. Boughton died at the home of his daughter, Joy, in Barnes, London, in 1960.

== Quotations about Boughton ==
- "I believe that Boughton's works will eventually be regarded as one of the most remarkable achievements in the story of our music" – Charles Kennedy Scott, 1915
- "The Immortal Hour is a work of genius" – Sir Edward Elgar, 1924
- "... The Immortal Hour enchants me. The whole thing gripped me" – Dame Ethel Smyth, 1922
- "Now that Elgar is gone, you have the only original personal English style on the market...I find that I have acquired a great taste for it" – George Bernard Shaw, 1934
- "I remember vividly how Boughton made his characters live, and the masterly effect of the choral writing" – Sir Arthur Bliss on The Immortal Hour, 1949
- "In any other country, such a work as The Immortal Hour would have been in the repertoire years ago" – Ralph Vaughan Williams, 1949

== The Rutland Boughton Music Trust ==
The Rutland Boughton Music Trust was established in 1978, the year of the composer's Centenary, to encourage performances and sponsor recordings of his works. Many of these, including some world premieres, the complete Immortal Hour and a selection of short choral pieces, have been issued by Hyperion Records label. The Oliver Cromwell symphony – first heard in 2005 – and three of the Songs of the English (last heard around 1904/5) have been released by Dutton, as well as a selection of Songs for mezzo and pianoforte on the British Music Society's own label. Dutton has also released the world premiere recording of Boughton's adaptation of Thomas Hardy's play, The Queen of Cornwall, sponsored by the Trust.

== Compositions (selective list) ==
=== Dramatic ===
==== Music-Drama ====
- The Birth of Arthur (1909)
- The Immortal Hour (1912–13)
- Bethlehem (1915)
- The Round Table (1915–16)
- Alkestis (1920–22)
- The Queen of Cornwall (1923–24)
- The Ever Young (1928–29)
- The Lily Maid (1933–34)
- Galahad (1943–44)
- Avalon (1944–45)

==== Shorter dramatic works ====
- The Chapel in Lyonesse (1904)
- Agincourt (1918)
- The Moon Maiden (1918)

==== Ballet ====
- Death Dance of Grania (1912)
- Snow White (1914)
- The Death of Columbine (1918)
- May Day (1926–27)

==== Incidental music ====
- Dante and Beatrice (c. 1902)
- The Land of Heart's Desire (1917)
- Little Plays of St Francis (1924–25)
- Isolt (1935)

=== Orchestral ===
- A Summer Night, symphonic poem (1899, revised 1903)
- The Chilterns, symphonic suite (1900)
- Britannia, symphonic march (1901)
- Variations on a Theme of Purcell (1901)
- Imperial Elegy: Into the Everlasting, symphonic poem (1901)
- Troilus and Cressida (Thou and I), symphonic poem (1902)
- School for Scandal, overture (1903)
- Symphony No. 1, Oliver Cromwell (1904–05)
- Love in Spring, symphonic poem (1906)
- Three Folk Dances, for string orchestra (1912)
- The Round Table, overture (1916)
- The Queen of Cornwall, overture (1926)
- Symphony No. 2, Deirdre (1926–27)
- Three Flights for Orchestra (1929)
- Winter Sun (1932), orchestral sketch
- Overture to the Arthurian Cycle (1936)
- Symphony No. 3 in B minor (1937)
- Rondo in Wartime (1941)
- Orchestral Prelude on a Christmas Hymn (1941)
- Reunion Variations (1945)
- Aylesbury Games, suite for string orchestra (1952)

=== Concertante ===
- Concerto for oboe and strings No. 1 in C (1936)
- Concerto for oboe and strings No. 2 in G (1937)
- Concerto for flute and strings (1937)
- Concerto for string orchestra (1937)
- Concerto for trumpet and orchestra (1943)

=== Chamber music ===
- Celtic Prelude "The Land of Heart’s Desire" (1921)
- Violin Sonata in D (1921)
- String Quartet No. 1 in A, The Greek (1923)
- String Quartet No. 2 in F, From the Welsh Hills (1923)
- Portrait: Trio for flute, oboe and piano (1925)
- Oboe Quartet No. 1 (1932)
- Winter Sun (1932), violin and piano
- Three Songs without Words, for oboe quartet (1937)
- Two Pieces for oboe and piano (1937)
- String Trio (1944)
- Oboe Quartet No. 2 (1945)
- Piano Trio (1948)
- Cello Sonata (1948)

=== Choral music ===
- The Skeleton in Armour, for chorus and orchestra (1898, revised 1903)
- Sir Galahad, for chorus and orchestra (1898)
- The Invincible Armada, for chorus and orchestra (1901)
- Two sets of Choral Variations, for unaccompanied chorus (1905)
- Midnight, symphonic poem for chorus and orchestra (1907)
- The City, motet for unaccompanied chorus (1909)
- Six Spiritual Songs, for unaccompanied chorus (1910)
- Six Celtic Choruses, for unaccompanied chorus (1914)
- The Cloud, for chorus and orchestra (1923)
- Pioneers, for chorus and orchestra (1925)
- Child of Earth, cycle for unaccompanied chorus (1927)

=== Songs ===
- Songs of the English for baritone and orchestra (1901)
- Four Faery Songs (1901)
- Six Songs of Manhood (1903)
- Five Celtic Songs, Fiona Macleod (1910)
- Songs of Womanhood (1911)
- Songs of Childhood (1912)
- Symbol Songs, Mary Richardson (1920)
- Four Everyman Songs (1922)
- Three Hardy Songs (1924)
- Four Songs op. 24, Edward Carpenter
- Three Songs, op. 39, Carpenter

== Scores ==
Most of Boughton's original manuscript scores can be viewed at the British Library. A large range of his printed music and other material is held in the library of the Royal College of Music and in the British Music Collection. The Rutland Boughton Music Trust has a list of compositions including the locations of scores.

== Sources ==
- Barber, Richard, King Arthur in Music. Boydell & Brewer, 1993.
- Benham, Patrick, The Avalonians. Gothic Image Publications, Rev. 2006.
- Brook, Donald, Composers' Gallery. Rockcliff, 1945
- Dent, Edward J, Opera. Penguin Books, 1940
- Hurd, Michael. 'Rutland Boughton', in Grove Music Online (2001)
- Hurd, Michael. Immortal Hour: The Life and Period of Rutland Boughton (1962). Rev. 1993 as Rutland Boughton and the Glastonbury Festivals. Rev. 2014 by The Rutland Boughton Music Trust.
- Mancoff, Debra N., The Arthurian Revival – Essays on Form, Tradition and Transformation. Garland Publishing Ltd, 1992.
- Randel, Don Michael (1996). The Harvard Biographical Dictionary of Music. Harvard University Press. p. 97. ISBN 9780674372993.
