= List of compositions by William Walton =

This is a list of compositions by William Walton sorted by genre, date of composition, title, and scoring.

Genre	Date	Title	Scoring	Notes
Opera	1947–1954	Troilus and Cressida	soloists, chorus and orchestra	in 3 acts; libretto by Christopher Hassall after Geoffrey Chaucer; revised 1963 and 1976
Opera	1967	The Bear, An Extravaganza	soloists and small orchestra	in 1 act; libretto by Paul Dehn and the composer based on the play by Anton Chekhov
Ballet	1935	The First Shoot	orchestra	libretto by Osbert Sitwell; choreography by Frederick Ashton; part of a revue Follow the Sun presented by Charles B. Cochran
Ballet	1940	The Wise Virgins	orchestra	in 1 act based on music by Johann Sebastian Bach; choreography by Frederick Ashton
Ballet	1943	The Quest	orchestra	in 5 scenes; libretto by Doris Langley Moore after Edmund Spenser; choreography by Frederick Ashton
Ballet	1975–1976; 1983	Varii Capricci	orchestra	free transcription of 5 Bagatelles for guitar; choreography by Frederick Ashton
Film score	1934	Escape Me Never (1935)		directed by Paul Czinner
Film score	1936	As You Like It (1936)		directed by Paul Czinner
Film score	1937	Dreaming Lips (1937)		directed by Paul Czinner
Film score	1938	Stolen Life (1939)		directed by Paul Czinner
Film score	1941	Major Barbara (1941)		directed by Gabriel Pascal
Film score	1941	Next of Kin (1942)		directed by Thorold Dickinson
Film score	1942	Foreman Went to France, The (1942)		directed by Charles Frend
Film score	1942	First of the Few, The (1942)		directed by and starring Leslie Howard; also known as Spitfire
Film score	1942	Went the Day Well? (1942)		directed by Alberto Cavalcanti
Film score	1944	Henry V (1944)		directed by and starring Laurence Olivier
Film score	1947	Hamlet (1948)		directed by and starring Laurence Olivier
Film score	1955	Richard III (1955)		directed by and starring Laurence Olivier
Film score	1969	Battle of Britain (1969)		directed by Guy Hamilton; Apart from the "Battle in the Air" sequence, the score was dropped before the film was released, and replaced with one by Ron Goodwin.
Film score	1969	Three Sisters (1970)		directed by Laurence Olivier
Incidental music	1925	A Son of Heaven		lost; for the play by Lytton Strachey
Incidental music	1936	The Boy David		lost; for the 1936 play by J. M. Barrie
Incidental music	1942	Christopher Columbus		for the radio play by Louis MacNeice starring Laurence Olivier
Incidental music	1942	Macbeth		for the play by William Shakespeare
Incidental music	1959	March for "A History of the English-Speaking Peoples"		composed for a projected ABC film series based on Winston Churchill's A History of the English-Speaking Peoples
Incidental music	1962	Granada Prelude, Call Signs and End Music		for Granada Television broadcasts
Incidental music	1977	Title Music for the BBC Television Shakespeare Series		
Orchestral	1921	Dr. Syntax, Pedagogic Overture	orchestra	lost
Orchestral	1921–1926	Façade, Suite No. 1	orchestra	orchestrated 1926
Orchestral	1921–1926; 1938	Façade, Suite No. 2	orchestra	orchestrated 1938
Orchestral	1924–1925	Portsmouth Point, Overture	orchestra	also for piano 4-hands
Orchestral	1926	Siesta	small orchestra	revised 1962; version for piano 4-hands 1928
Orchestral	1932–1935	Symphony No. 1 in B♭ minor	orchestra	
Orchestral	1937	Crown Imperial, A Coronation March	orchestra	composed for the coronation of George VI; also for piano solo
Orchestral	1940, 1941	Music for Children, Suite	orchestra	orchestration of Duets for Children for piano 4-hands music used for the 1949 ballet Devoirs des Vacances with libretto by Boris Kochno and produced at the Théâtre des Champs-Élysées in Paris
Orchestral	1940	Scapino, A Comedy Overture	orchestra	revised 1949
Orchestral	1940	The Wise Virgins, Suite from the Ballet	orchestra	based on music by Johann Sebastian Bach
Orchestral	1942	Prelude and Fugue "The Spitfire"	orchestra	from the film score The First of the Few
Orchestral	1943, 1961	The Quest, Suite from the Ballet	orchestra	arranged 1961 by Vilém Tauský
Orchestral	1944	2 Pieces from the Film Music Henry V: 1. Passacaglia: Death of Falstaff; 2. Touch Her Soft Lips and Part	string orchestra	from the film score Henry V
Orchestral	1944, 1963	Suite from Henry V	orchestra	arranged 1963 by Muir Mathieson from the film score Henry V
Orchestral	1945	Memorial Fanfare for Henry Wood	orchestra	
Orchestral	1946, 1971	Sonata	string orchestra	orchestration of String Quartet in A minor
Orchestral	1947, 1967	Hamlet and Ophelia, Poem	orchestra	adapted 1967 by Muir Mathieson from the film score Hamlet
Orchestral	1947, 1967	Hamlet: Funeral March	orchestra	arranged 1967 by Muir Mathieson from the film score Hamlet
Orchestral	1953	The National Anthem	orchestra	also an Introduction for brass and percussion
Orchestral	1953	Orb and Sceptre, Coronation March	orchestra	composed for the coronation of Elizabeth II
Orchestral	1953	Variations on an Elizabethan Theme Variation VI: Finale, Fuga à la gigue	string orchestra	based on Sellinger's Round by William Byrd jointly composed with Benjamin Britten, Lennox Berkeley, Arthur Oldham, Humphrey Searle and Michael Tippett
Orchestral	1955	God Save the Queen	orchestra	arrangement
Orchestral	1955	The Star-Spangled Banner	orchestra	arrangement
Orchestra	1955	A Winter Journey	orchestra	arranged by Edward Watson from the film score Richard III
Orchestral	1955, 1963	Richard III: A Shakespeare Suite	orchestra	arranged 1963 by Muir Mathieson from the film score Richard III
Orchestral	1956	Johannesburg Festival Overture	orchestra	
Orchestral	1957	Partita for Orchestra: 1. Toccata; 2. Pastorale Siciliana; 3. Giga Burlesca	orchestra	
Orchestral	1959–1960	Symphony No. 2	orchestra	commissioned by the Royal Liverpool Philharmonic Society
Orchestral	1962	Prelude "Granada"	orchestra	composed as Granada Prelude, Call Signs and End Music for Granada Television broadcasts
Orchestral	1962–1963	Variations on a Theme by Hindemith	orchestra	theme taken from movement II of Paul Hindemith's Cello Concerto (1940)
Orchestral	1968	Capriccio burlesco	orchestra	
Orchestral	1969	Improvisations on an Impromptu of Benjamin Britten	orchestra	theme taken from movement III of Benjamin Britten's Piano Concerto
Orchestral	1975–1976	Varii Capricci	orchestra	free transcription of 5 Bagatelles for guitar; used as ballet 1983
Orchestral	1982	Prologo e Fantasia	orchestra	
Concertante	1926–1927	Sinfonia Concertante	piano and orchestra	revised 1943; arranged 1928 for 2 pianos
Concertante	1928–1929	Viola Concerto	viola and orchestra	revised 1961; written for Lionel Tertis but premiered by Paul Hindemith
Concertante	1938–1939	Violin Concerto	violin and orchestra	written for Jascha Heifetz; orchestration revised 1943
Concertante	1956	Cello Concerto	cello and orchestra	written for Gregor Piatigorsky
Brass ensemble	1947	Fanfare for a Great Occasion	brass and percussion	arranged 1962 by Malcolm Sargent from the film score Hamlet
Brass ensemble	1979	Introduction to the National Anthem, A Fanfare	brass (3 trumpets, 3 trombones) and snare drum	
Brass ensemble	1959	A Queen's Fanfare	brass (8 trumpets, 4 trombones)	
Brass ensemble	1973	Anniversary Fanfare	brass (9 trumpets, 7 trombones), timpani and percussion	
Brass ensemble	1974	Fanfare for the National	brass, timpani and percussion	for the Royal National Theatre
Brass ensemble	1975	Roaring Fanfare	brass (3 trumpets, 3 trombones, 2 bass trombones) and percussion	
Brass ensemble	1979	Medley	brass band	
Brass ensemble	1979	Salute for Sir Robert Mayer on His 100th Anniversary	brass (12 trumpets) and percussion	
Brass ensemble	1935, 1981	The First Shoot	brass band	
Brass ensemble	1981	A Birthday Fanfare	brass (3 trumpets, 4 horns) and percussion brass (7 trumpets) and percussion	composed as a 70th birthday present for Karl-Friedrich Still, Walton's neighbour in Ischia
Chamber music	1919, 1921	Piano Quartet	violin, viola, cello and piano	revised 1921 and 1974–1975
Chamber music	1919–1922	String Quartet No. 1	2 violins, viola and cello	
Chamber music	1922–1923	Toccata in A minor	violin and piano	
Chamber music	1944–1947	String Quartet in A minor	2 violins, viola and cello	orchestrated 1971 as Sonata for String Orchestra
Chamber music	1948–1950	2 Pieces: 1. Canzonetta; 2. Scherzetto	violin and piano	
Chamber music	1949	Sonata	violin and piano	revised 1950; written for Yehudi Menuhin and Louis Kentner
Chamber music	1970	Tema (per variazioni)	cello	also Theme for Variations; part of Music for a Prince (14 contributors)
Chamber music	1970–1971	5 Bagatelles	guitar	written for Julian Bream and dedicated to Malcolm Arnold orchestrated as Varii Capricci
Chamber music	1980	Passacaglia	cello	2 versions; written for Mstislav Rostropovich
Chamber music	1982	Duettino	oboe and violin	
Keyboard	1916	Chorale Prelude on Wheatley	organ	
Keyboard	1917	Valse in C minor	piano	
Keyboard	1936	Theme for Improvisation	organ	
Keyboard	1940	Tunes for my Niece	piano	
Keyboard	1940	Duets for Children	piano 4-hands	orchestrated 1941 as Music for Children
Keyboard	1949	Galop Final	piano	composed as a 'finale' for the ballet Devoirs des Vacances (see Music for Children) orchestrated by Christopher Palmer
Keyboard	1925	Portsmouth Point	piano 4-hands	also for orchestra
Keyboard	1926	Valse from Façade	piano	concert arrangement by the composer
Keyboard	1926, 1928	Siesta	piano 4-hands	original for orchestra; arranged 1928 by the composer
Keyboard	1931	Choral Prelude 'Herzlich thut mich verlangen'	piano	free arrangement of Johann Sebastian Bach's organ prelude, BWV 727
Keyboard	1934	Ballet	piano	from the film score Escape Me Never
Keyboard	1937	Crown Imperial	piano	original for orchestra; arranged by the composer
Keyboard	1944	Lai and Rondet de carol	piano	lost
Keyboard	1963	3 Pieces: 1. March; 2. Elegy; 3. Scherzetto	organ	from the film score Richard III
Vocal	1916	Tell Me Where Is Fancy Bred?	soprano, tenor, 3 violins and piano soprano, tenor and piano	words by William Shakespeare
Vocal	1918	4 Songs: 1. Child's Song; 2. Love Laid His Sleepless Head; 3. A Lyke-wake Song; 4. The Winds	voice and piano	words by Algernon Charles Swinburne
Vocal	1920	Tritons	voice and piano	words by William Drummond of Hawthornden
Vocal	1920	The Passionate Shepherd	tenor and 10 instruments	words by Christopher Marlowe; lost
Vocal	1921–1926	Façade: An Entertainment	reciter and chamber ensemble	words by Edith Sitwell
Vocal	1921–1929; 1977	Façade 2: A Further Entertainment	reciter and chamber ensemble	words by Edith Sitwell; revision 1977 of 8 discarded items from original Façade
Vocal	1932	3 Songs to Poems by Edith Sitwell: 1. Daphne; 2. Through Gilded Trellises; 3. Old Sir Faulk	voice and piano	words by Edith Sitwell; original 1924 version Bucolic Comedies (lost); arranged from Façade
Vocal	1936	Under the Greenwood Tree	voice (or unison voices) and piano	words by William Shakespeare; from the 1936 film score As You Like It
Vocal	1942	Beatriz's Song	voice and string quartet (or piano)	words by Louis MacNeice; from the 1942 radio play Christopher Columbus
Vocal	1960	Anon in Love: 1. Fain Would I Change That Note; 2. O Stay, Sweet Love; 3. Lady, When I Behold the Roses; 4. My Love in Her Attire; 5. I Gave Her Cakes and I Gave Her Ale; 6. To Couple Is a Custom	tenor and guitar tenor, string orchestra, harp and percussion	anonymous 16th- and 17th-century lyrics; written for Peter Pears and Julian Bream orchestrated 1971
Vocal	1962	A Song for the Lord Mayor's Table, Song Cycle: 1. The Lord Mayor's Table; 2. Glide Gently; 3. Wapping Old Stairs; 4. Holy Thursday; 5. The Contrast; 6. Rhyme	soprano and piano (or orchestra)	premiered by Elisabeth Schwarzkopf and Gerald Moore; 1. words by Thomas Jordan (1612?–1685); 2. words by William Wordsworth; 3. words by "Arley" (1787); 4. words by William Blake; 5. words by Charles Morris (1745–1838); 6. words by anonymous
Choral	1916	The Forsaken Merman, Cantata	soprano, tenor, double female chorus and orchestra	words by Matthew Arnold
Choral	1916	A Litany, Motet	mixed chorus a cappella	words by Phineas Fletcher; 3 versions; revised 1930
Choral	1931	Belshazzar's Feast	baritone, mixed chorus and orchestra	Biblical words selected by Osbert Sitwell; revised 1948
Choral	1931	Make We Joy Now in This Fest, Old English Carol	mixed chorus a cappella	
Choral	1936	Under the Greenwood Tree	unison voices (or solo voice) and piano	words by William Shakespeare; from the 1936 film score As You Like It
Choral	1937	In Honour of the City of London	mixed chorus and orchestra	words by William Dunbar
Choral	1938	Set Me as a Seal upon Thine Heart, An Anthem	mixed chorus a cappella	Biblical words from the Song of Solomon
Choral	1946	Where Does the Uttered Music Go?	mixed chorus a cappella	words by John Masefield; written for a memorial service for Henry Wood
Choral	1949–1950	Put Off the Serpent Girdle, Part-Song	female chorus a cappella	words by Christopher Hassall and Paul Dehn
Choral	1952	Coronation Te Deum	mixed chorus, orchestra and organ	composed for the coronation of Elizabeth II
Choral	1961	Gloria	alto, tenor, bass, double mixed chorus and orchestra	
Choral	1961	What Cheer?, A Christmas Carol	mixed chorus a cappella	
Choral	1964–1965	The Twelve, An Anthem for the Feast of Any Apostle	mixed chorus and organ (or orchestra)	words by W. H. Auden
Choral	1966	Missa Brevis	double mixed chorus and organ (in "Gloria" only)	
Choral	1970	All This Time, Carol	mixed chorus a cappella	16th-century words
Choral	1971–1972	Jubilate Deo	double mixed chorus and organ	
Choral	1974	Cantico del Sole, Motet	mixed chorus a cappella	words by St. Francis of Assisi in translation by S. Wright
Choral	1974, 1976	Magnificat and Nunc Dimittis	soprano, alto, tenor, bass, mixed chorus and organ	revised 1976
Choral	1977	Antiphon	mixed chorus and organ	
Choral	1977	King Herod and the Cock, Carol	mixed chorus a cappella	

== See also ==
- William Walton: film music

== Sources ==
- Lloyd, Stephen (2001). William Walton: Muse of Fire. Woodbridge, Suffolk: The Boydell Press. ISBN 0-85115-803-X.
