= Symphony No. 2 (Walton) =

1960 symphony by William Walton

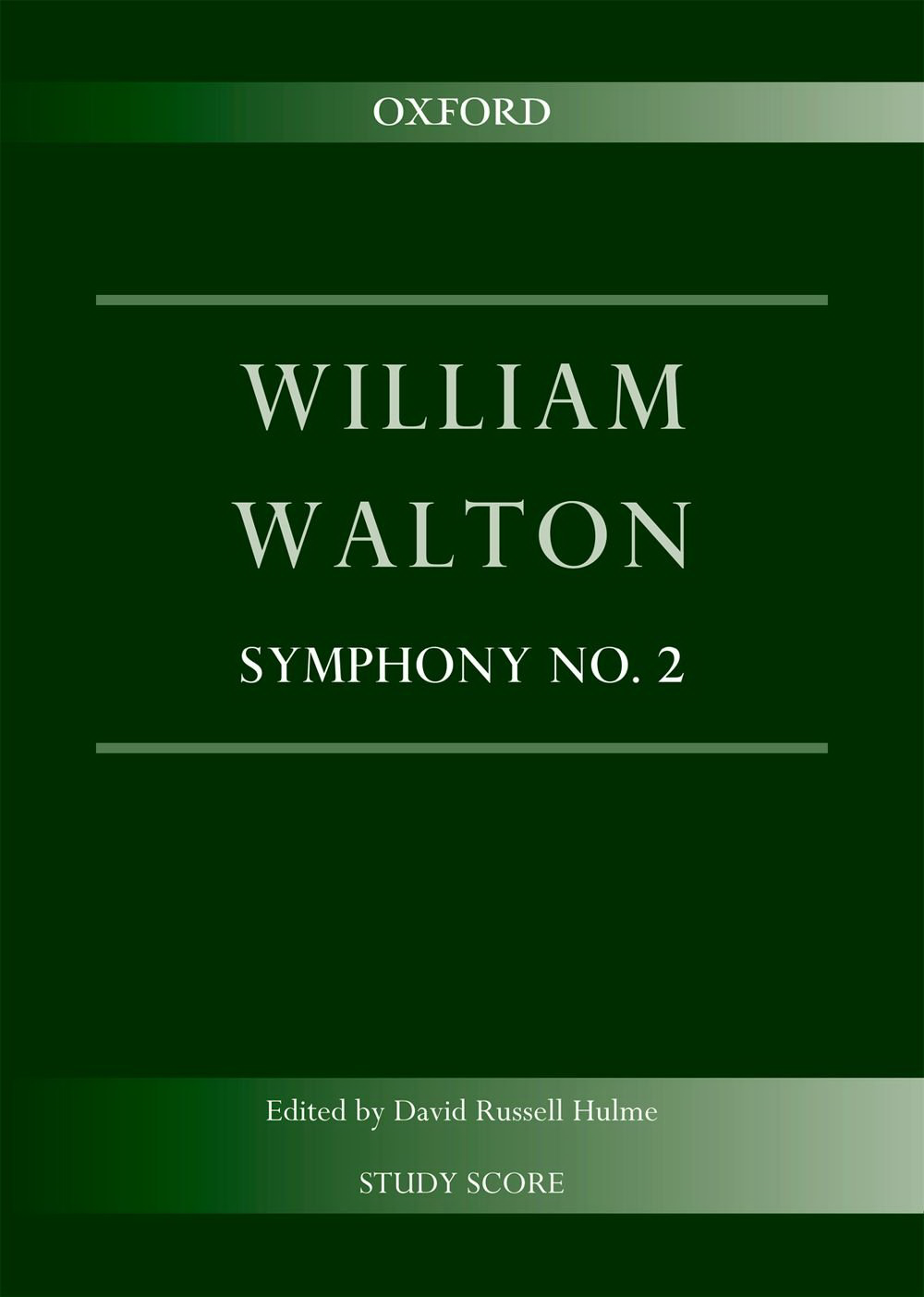
Cover of published score

William Walton composed his Symphony No. 2 between 1957 and 1960. It was commissioned in November 1955 by the Liverpool Philharmonic Society and was originally intended to commemorate in 1957 the 750th anniversary of the city of Liverpool's royal charter of 1207. Walton, although a diligent worker, did not habitually compose quickly. In addition, existing commissions and other challenges further delayed the completion of the symphony. He finished the first movement in 1959, then the last two in 1960; that same year, he revised the first into its final form. By the time the symphony was completed, the occasion for which it was composed had passed. The city of Liverpool agreed to cede the location of the world premiere to the Edinburgh Festival, with the proviso that it be played by the Royal Liverpool Philharmonic. Conducted by John Pritchard, they performed the world premiere at the Usher Hall in Edinburgh, on 2 September 1960.

Walton perceived the initial critical reaction to his Second Symphony as a disaster. Twenty-five years had passed since he had composed his First Symphony. Expectations among British critics that the Second Symphony would surpass its predecessor were high. Instead, they were largely disappointed by the work's lighter mood and conservative idiom. Neville Cardus accused the composer of synthesising compositional tropes that he had previously employed. Peter Heyworth praised Walton's aesthetic convictions but criticised the composer for failing to develop and for stereotyping his own style.

The symphony met with a more favourable response in the United States. George Szell, the music director of the Cleveland Orchestra, had championed Walton's music since the 1930s. On 29 December 1960 he conducted the American premiere of the Second Symphony at Severance Hall in Cleveland, Ohio. Early in 1961 the Cleveland Orchestra recorded for Epic Records what Szell hoped to be the definitive recording of the symphony. He later said that its success was crucial in goading British critics to re-examine the work. "[Walton] had felt that Edinburgh had almost killed his new work", the composer's wife wrote, "and now Szell had caused it to be reborn". On Szell's death in 1970, Walton rededicated his Second Symphony to the conductor's memory as a gesture of gratitude.

== Background ==
=== Rise and stall ===
Early in his career critical consensus was that William Walton appeared to be on the cusp of a breakthrough as a modernist composer, shown by a series of compositions whose stylistic trajectory culminated with the first three movements of his First Symphony. During that period, his friend and colleague Constant Lambert ranked him as one of "the most vital minds of the present generation". When the First Symphony was finally completed and premiered, it met with widespread admiration. It also stoked expectations that it would be the first of a cycle of symphonies by Walton.

After the First Symphony Walton's modernist career stalled. Instead, he turned to a more conservative idiom. By the mid-1930s he was seen not as a modernist but as the successor to Elgar in the broad English musical tradition. According to the musicologist J. P. E. Harper-Scott:

The standard wisdom is that although it is possible to enjoy his later music, it seems clear that during the 1930s something occurred – perhaps nothing more complicated to grasp than his increasing separation from the ultra-modern Sitwells, with whom he had lodged for over a decade – to deflect him from any recognizably modern approach to musical language and form. He has been disqualified from the club of composers whose works can justifiably figure in the narrative of music history.

The First remained Walton's only symphony for the next twenty-five years. He composed other orchestral works during this period, but none demonstrated the technical and expressive scope of the First Symphony. The editor of the 2006 and 2012 critical edition of Walton's score, David Russell Hulme, comments that the composer was "reluctant and perhaps temperamentally disinclined to travel the same road twice" and rarely chose to compose more than one major concert or stage work in any genre. (Note: Russell Hulme adds that Belshazzar's Feast and Façade stand alone; Troilus and Cressida is Walton's only full-scale opera; there is only one mature string quartet, and no two concertos for any one instrument.) Russell Hulme adds that it is therefore unsurprising that the second of Walton's two symphonies "was a long time appearing and that, when it did appear, it should prove to be a very different work from its predecessor".

=== Commission and composition ===
In 1953 Alan Frank, Walton's publisher at the Oxford University Press, suggested to Ian Hunter, artistic director of the Edinburgh Festival, that the festival might commission a new symphony from Walton to be premiered at the 1956 festival. Both Hunter and Walton greeted the idea with enthusiasm, but Walton was fully occupied with the demanding preparations for the Covent Garden premiere of his opera Troilus and Cressida, fixed for December 1954, and the plan came to nothing. A more concrete proposal was put forward in 1955 by the Liverpool Philharmonic Society for a symphony to be premiered in 1957 to commemorate the 750th anniversary of Liverpool's city charter. Walton had other commissions to complete, including the Partita for Orchestra, music for a television series based on Winston Churchill's History of the English-Speaking Peoples, and Anon in Love (a song cycle for Peter Pears and Julian Bream). Progress was impeded by the composer's recovery from a bad car crash in the first part of 1957. A tentative premiere date of 28 December 1958 was cancelled when Walton could not produce a finished score in time.

Although a diligent worker, Walton composed music slowly. In a 1961 interview with the musicologist Eric Salzman for The New York Times, Walton said that the atmosphere of his home on the Italian island of Ischia did not encourage hard work. "One is inclined to dolce far niente", he said. "I know that's degenerate, but it's quite nice really". Moreover, Walton had exhausted the potential for ideas that he had formerly extracted from Sibelius and Prokofiev, whose music was no longer in accord with the prevailing musical aesthetic ideals of the mid-1950s. He also faced formidable difficulties not only in composing a symphony during a period when the future of the genre was increasingly viewed with doubt, but composing one that would be regarded as a worthy successor to the First Symphony. In reference to the challenges he faced in the creation of the earlier work, Walton joked that this time he would complete the finale first and have it performed alone. (Note: Walton had experienced severe writer's block during the composition of the First Symphony and the finale was not complete by the time of the premiere of the piece, which was played without it (3 December 1934). The complete symphony was not given in public until 6 November 1935.)

Walton wrote to Frank on 28 November 1957 that "glimmerings of the [Second Symphony] [were] beginning to stir slightly". Throughout that year and 1958, Walton worked on sketching the Second Symphony. He was able to devote himself to the completion of the symphony starting in 1959. In January of that year he completed a draft of the first movement. That April, he showed it to his fellow composer Hans Werner Henze, who approved of the results. The second movement was completed in February 1960, followed by the finale on 22 July. He also revised the first movement earlier in the same year.

By the time the Second Symphony was completed, the occasion it had been intended to commemorate had passed. The city of Liverpool agreed to cede the location of the work's premiere to the 1960 Edinburgh Festival, with the proviso that it be played there by the Royal Liverpool Philharmonic, the score's original dedicatees.

== Music ==
=== Instrumentation ===
Walton's Second Symphony is scored for the following instruments:

Woodwinds
3 Flutes (3rd doubling piccolo)
3 Oboes (3rd doubling cor anglais)
3 Clarinets (2nd doubling clarinet in E-flat, 3rd doubling bass clarinet)
3 Bassoons (3rd doubling contrabassoon)

Brass
4 French horns
3 Trumpets
3 Trombones
Tuba

Percussion (four players)

Timpani
Military drum
Tenor drum
Cymbals (crash and suspended)
Bass drum
Glockenspiel
Xylophone
Vibraphone
Tambourine
Bell in D

Keyboards
Piano
Celesta

Strings
2 Harps
1st Violins
2nd Violins
Violas
Cellos
Double Basses

=== Timing ===
A typical performance lasts approximately 28 minutes. See table, below.

=== Publication and manuscript ===
The score was published in 1960 by the Oxford University Press (OUP). In 2006 the OUP issued a new critical edition, edited by Russell Hulme, as part of the OUP's Walton Edition, and republished as a single-volume study score in 2012. The manuscript is held in the Frederick R. Koch Collection at the Beinecke Rare Book and Manuscript Library in Yale University.

=== Structure ===
The symphony consists of three similarly-proportioned movements that unfold in linear fashion. As a whole, according to the musicologist Robert Matthew-Walker, it amalgamates influences from the Second Viennese School. In spite of employing a larger orchestra than its predecessor, the Second Symphony's general mood is lighter. Walton's biographer Neil Tierney has likened the symphony to a large-scale divertimento, an opinion echoed by the music critic Michael Kennedy, in whose view it would have been more appropriate to have labelled the work a "sinfonietta".

==== I. Allegro molto ====
The opening movement in sonata form, marked "Allegro molto", begins in 3/4; it is mainly derived from the leap of a major seventh. Its opening augmented eleventh alludes to the same chord at the start of Alban Berg's Violin Concerto, while the initial theme – accompanied by strings and celesta in G minor – evokes parallels with material from Walton's Violin Concerto and his opera Troilus and Cressida. Unlike its equivalent in the First Symphony, the Second's opening movement eschews the use of pedal points entirely. The result, Matthew-Walker wrote, is that "the music's sense of flight, in the vivid Mediterranean-like chiaroscuro colouring and in the virtuosic scoring for woodwind and high strings, seems to defy musical gravity".

A bridge passage for violins and violas segues into the tonally ambiguous second subject, which is orchestrated in the style of Klangfarbenmelodie; its melody is confined to six notes – B♭-A-F♯-G-E♭-D – which, the composer and critic Francis Routh has commented, are the first six notes of the passacaglia to come in the finale, thereby establishing "a thematic continuity". The second subject provides a brief respite before the movement resumes its agitated pace. The critic Frank Howes describes the next section as "noisy with glissandi, percussion, brass, and short snaps and stutters on the strings". A development section leads to a recapitulation in which the first subject is compressed to the half the length of its original form and the second subject is extended to be slightly longer than at its first appearance. A solo horn announces the coda; the opening motif is repeated and the movement concludes softly in G minor.

The critic Bayan Northcott writes that cumulatively "the trapping of [the first movement's] gestural fun and games in a singularly constricted and dissonant harmonic field produces as unsettling an effect as anything in Walton".

==== II. Lento assai ====
The second movement is in 4/4 and its tempo is designated "Lento assai". Tierney describes it as appearing to be "an almost continuous, unbroken web of sumptuous cantilena writing". Each idea is developed from its predecessor organically. Howes describes the movement as "brimming with ideas of great immediate beauty" and suggests that it could function on its own as a symphonic poem. He further compared the climax to an operatic scene. This gives way to a passage of ascending and descending figures on woodwinds, celesta, harps, and strings framing a solo horn. The movement ends in harmonic uncertainty between B major and B minor.

==== III. Passacaglia: Theme. Risoluto – Variations – Fugato – Coda. Scherzando ====
The finale is in the form of a passacaglia. It opens in 3/4 with a massive statement in unison by the entire orchestra of the theme, which is composed of all twelve notes of the chromatic scale. Walton's biographer Stephen Lloyd has described it as "an effort to play the atonalists at their own game". Walton rebutted that perception to Salzman:

[The critics] thought I was making fun. They forget that my first big work was an atonal quartet [the String Quartet No. 1] performed at Salzburg in 1928 by the International Society of Contemporary Music. If I produced it now, they would think I've gone off my head.

Although it resembles the tone rows used by the composers of the Second Viennese School (and by Walton himself in the second movement of his Violin Sonata, 1949) the theme is securely rooted in G minor and is employed as a cantus firmus, similar to Benjamin Britten's use of this device in his opera The Turn of the Screw. It is followed by a succession of ten brief variations that lead into a fugato section and the movement's coda:

- Passacaglia: Theme – Risoluto (14 bars)
- Variation 1 Con slancio (14 bars)
- Variation 2 Scherzando (17 bars)
- Variation 3 L'istesso movimento (14 bars)
- Variation 4 Grazioso (14 bars)
- Variation 5 Agitato (14 bars)
- Variation 6 not headed (14 bars)
- Variation 7 Impetuoso (10 bars)
- Variation 8 Tranquillo (23 bars)
- Variation 9 Lento (10 bars)
- Variation 10 Risoluto (21 bars)
- Fugato (61 bars)
- Coda – Scherzando (più mosso) – Presto – Maestoso (111 bars)

Source: William Walton: A Catalogue of Works.

After the score was published, the conductor and critic David Lloyd-Jones wrote in 1961 that the fugato section was "a barren piece of writing [that] presents an almost insurmountable problem of articulation for the strings at the composer's tempo", and called the coda "a pot-pourri of Waltonian cliché". The symphony ends with emphatic and repeated tutti statements of chords in G major. The analyst Robert Meikle comments that the finale illustrates the difference between improvisations and variations:

Each variation invents and exploits a particular texture, five of the ten variations are the same length as the theme (14 bars) and even those of differing lengths exhibit a consistency of structure and treatment which immediately marks them out as variations, not improvisations.

== Premieres ==
=== World premiere ===
Walton's Second Symphony was premiered during the Edinburgh Festival on 2 September 1960 at the Usher Hall in Edinburgh; it was played by the Royal Liverpool Philharmonic Orchestra (RLPO) conducted by John Pritchard. The composer, according to his widow, Susana, was dissatisfied that the inferior rehearsal venue, a schoolhouse, prevented a proper balance of sound for the concert performance, but the music critic of The Times found the performance memorable, praised the conductor's skill and said that the orchestra had won fresh laurels. The concert programme also included Berg's Violin Concerto, a work based on a twelve-tone series that – like the passacaglia in Walton's symphony – begins with triadic intervals.

Walton made minor changes to the score after the first performance, in time for the work's London début, at the Royal Festival Hall on 23 November 1960. Pritchard again conducted the RLPO.

=== Continental Europe and American premieres ===
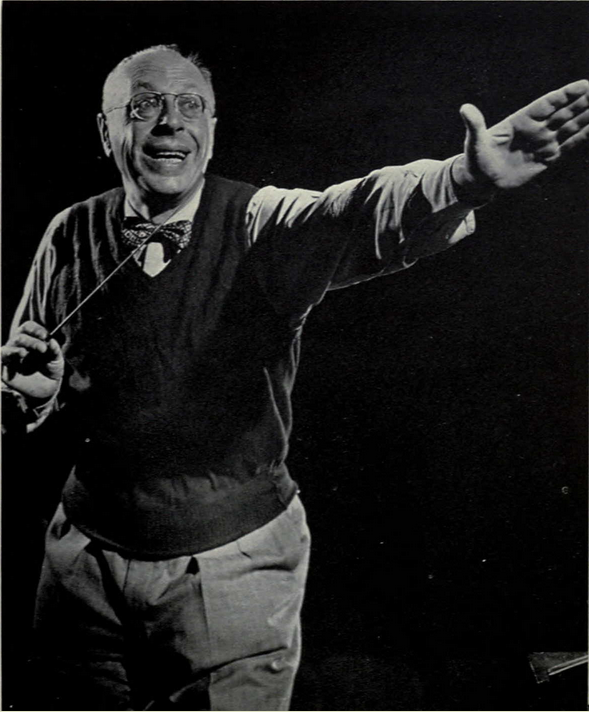
George Szell in 1956

The first performance outside Britain was in Amsterdam in November 1960. George Szell conducted the Concertgebouw Orchestra. He conducted the Cleveland Orchestra in the American premiere on 29 December 1960 at Severance Hall in Cleveland. (Note: Throughout much of his career Szell championed Walton's music; he admired the composer's craft, virtuosity, rhythmic vigour, and fusion of modernist and traditional means. In 1939 he conducted the Australian premiere of Walton's First Symphony. Michael Charry, his biographer, wrote that the conductor subsequently became as closely identified with Walton's music as Arturo Toscanini and Bruno Walter had with the music of Giacomo Puccini and Gustav Mahler respectively.) He and Walton had established a correspondence some years earlier, when Szell, as music director of the Cleveland Orchestra, commissioned Walton's Partita for Orchestra, premiered in January 1958, but they first met in Amsterdam for the performance of the symphony. Marius Flothuis, the Concertgebouw's artistic director, suggested inviting the composer to attend the rehearsals and local premiere. Szell boasted to reporters that the Amsterdam performance pleased Walton so greatly that he had promised Szell and the Cleveland Orchestra his next orchestral composition; the eventual result was the Variations on a Theme by Hindemith in 1963, premiered in London by the Royal Philharmonic Orchestra conducted by the composer but soon performed by Szell and his players in the US and Canada to enthusiastic audiences.

Szell and Cleveland gave the New York premiere of the symphony at Carnegie Hall on 5 February 1961. Walton attended the latter performance, accompanied by his wife. Szell's performance, she later wrote, greatly impressed the composer. In response to Szell's death in 1970 Walton rededicated the symphony to the conductor's memory.

== Reception ==
=== United Kingdom ===
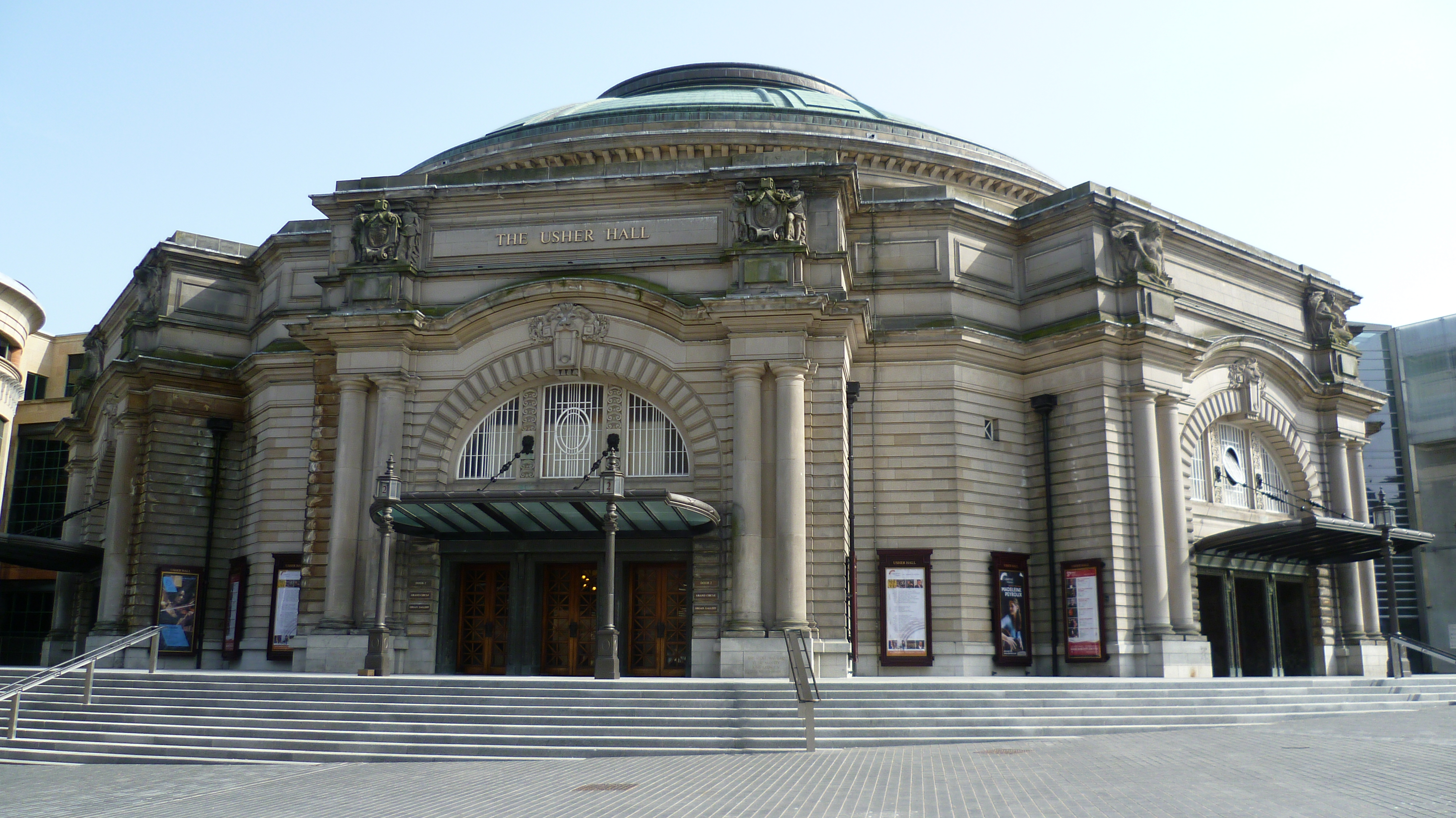
Usher Hall in Edinburgh

Lloyd wrote that a record reviewer commented that the "trouble with [Walton's] Second Symphony was [his] First Symphony". British critics who expected the Second Symphony to surpass the grandeur of the earlier work were mostly disappointed. The symphony, nevertheless, met with an ovation at its world premiere, although the work's merits were debated. A. K. Holland, the music critic of the Liverpool Daily Post, said that Walton had no reason to be dissatisfied by the audience's reception to the symphony's premiere. Walton, nevertheless, regarded the British response to his Second Symphony as a disaster.

In his review of the premiere for The Guardian, the critic Neville Cardus said that the Second Symphony, while arriving at a critical point in Walton's career, did not expand his harmonic language and that it evinced the routine technical competence that he felt were typical of commissioned compositions. He continued by saying that the work "sometimes [seemed to be] a Waltonian synthesis" of compositional tropes that had previously been used in the First Symphony, Scapino, and the concertos for Viola and Violin. Cardus admitted that he did not understand the symphony's first movement, but nonetheless faulted it for relying on technical virtuosity rather than "inner imagination" to achieve its resolution. He also criticised the finale for not amounting to "more than mere ingenuities of plastic craftsmanship". Felix Aprahamian warmly welcomed the work and congratulated the composer for entirely avoiding "the inhumanly conceived desiccations of an ingenious but tone-deaf avant-garde".

Peter Heyworth, in his review for The Observer, wrote that he respected Walton's resistance to the musical trends of his time. Although Heyworth mentioned in passing that he believed the First Symphony to be overrated, he did not think the Second to be a development in Walton's style. He decried the composer for descending into stereotyping of his own style in the finale's fugato and for "[resorting] to bombast in a somewhat too apparent attempt to bring [the Second Symphony] to an end with a big bang". The familiarity of the symphony's idiom, which Heyworth said would not have been new even in 1902, the year of the composer's birth, would attract some listeners and repel others. Despite his evaluation of the symphony, Heyworth also praised aspects of it, including what he felt were passages of striking beauty in the "Lento assai" that he compared to the work of Elgar and Richard Strauss:

The only test of an idiom's validity is whether a composer can make it his own, and, eclectic though Walton's musical language may be, there leaps from almost every bar an intense sense of character, compounded of that odd assortment of jauntiness, irony, and an underlying melancholy. A creative artist often reflects the society that gives him birth, and who are we to object if [Walton], like most of us, prefers to look backward, provided that he does it his own way? [...] Still, whatever its defects of form, [the Second Symphony] warms the heart, and at least Walton cannot be accused of suffering from the national disease of castrated good taste: there is no lavender water in his lyricism.

Northcott said the Second Symphony generated some of the most negative criticism that Walton ever received. Plans to record the work for EMI were indefinitely postponed pending reaction to further performances. (Note: EMI did not record the Second Symphony until sessions in February and June 1973. That recording, by André Previn and the London Symphony Orchestra, was released in 1974. It was the first commercial recording after Szell's: see table of recordings, above.) Walton would later refer to it as "that despised Second Symphony of mine". Kennedy wrote in 1989 that it was easy to understand why it was initially underappreciated: "Everyone was expecting another emotional blockbuster like the First [Symphony]".

=== United States ===
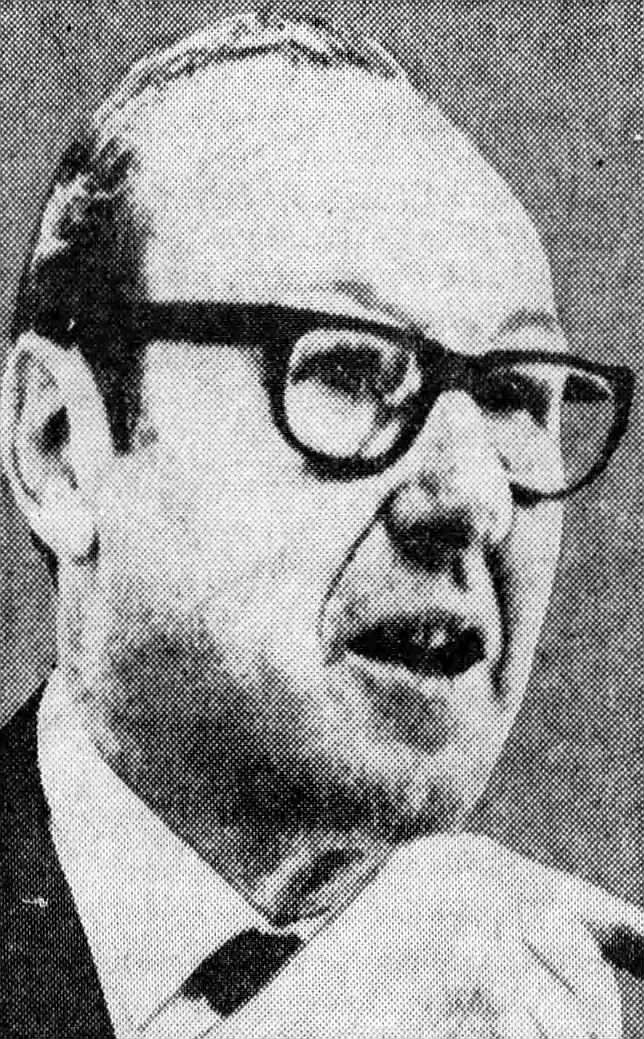
Harold C. Schonberg, who referred to Walton as "the dean of English composers", was among the Second Symphony's supporters.

Walton's Second Symphony did not begin to generate more positive appraisals until after it was played by Szell and the Cleveland Orchestra. In his review of the American premiere, Herbert Elwell, the music critic of The Plain Dealer in Cleveland, expressed similar reservations to those published by British critics. Even so, his concluded that it was "an engaging work [that exhibited] Walton's brilliant orchestral mastery, his humor, his compassion, and, thank God, his ability still to do something interesting within the diatonic system".

Harold C. Schonberg, the chief music critic of The New York Times, was even more approving of Walton, whom he called "the dean of English composers". In his review, he said that the Second Symphony drew on various influences, but that Walton fused them into his personal style. "[The] philosophy that animated them also animates him", he wrote. Schonberg then praised the finale for its "deft, occasionally humorous, and witty" use of passacaglia form. The music critic for the New York World-Telegram and Sun, Louis Biancolli, wrote that the New York premiere of the Second Symphony had earned Walton an unequivocal triumph. "He could scarcely have dreamed of a performance like last night's", Biancolli continued. "On that count – plus the response of the crowd – he had every right to beam with pride and pleasure when brought out for a bow". The New York response to the Second Symphony was appreciative enough that Walton and his wife celebrated with champagne after the concert.

In a later radio interview with the broadcaster Martin Perlich for WCLV, Szell explained how his support of the Second Symphony had been decisive in improving its reception:

[Walton's Second Symphony] at its first performance in London with the Royal Philharmonic for whose anniversary it was composed [sic] did not find great favor with the London critics. When our record came out over there, they changed their mind completely, and one of the critics made the issue of live performance versus recorded performance the subject of a very long article in which he stated that if a recorded performance is so superior, then it very often reveals the scope and extent and quality of a work much better than a mediocre live performance on which they had originally based their judgment. So our recorded performance [...] changed their mind about the work itself.

"[Walton] had felt that Edinburgh had almost killed his new work", the composer's widow wrote, "and now Szell had caused it to be reborn".

== Recordings ==
Orchestra	Conductor	Date	Timing	Ref
Cologne Radio Symphony Orchestra	George Szell	1961 (Note: Live concert recording, 19 May 1961; issued on CD in 2023)	26'14	Archipel ARPCD0831
Cleveland Orchestra	George Szell	1962	26'57"	OCLC 181887099
London Symphony Orchestra	André Previn	1973	27'28"	OCLC 28323932
London Symphony Orchestra	Sir Charles Mackerras	1989	28'23"	OCLC 220876770
London Philharmonic Orchestra	Bryden Thomson	1990	29'29"	OCLC 659002008
Royal Philharmonic Orchestra	Vladimir Ashkenazy	1991	27'53"	OCLC 1263595239
Bournemouth Symphony Orchestra	Andrew Litton	1995	28'05"	OCLC 1026134274
BBC Scottish Symphony Orchestra	Martyn Brabbins	1995	28'19"	OCLC 643718116
English Northern Philharmonia	Paul Daniel	1995	27'41"	OCLC 811256855
Orchestre national de Lille	Owain Arwel Hughes	2010	26'24	OCLC 811452107
New Haven Symphony Orchestra	William Boughton	2014	29'13	OCLC 913864523
BBC Symphony Orchestra	Edward Gardner	2015	28'01	OCLC 927336024
Bournemouth Symphony Orchestra	Kirill Karabits	2017	30'15	OCLC 1245938065

Source: Naxos Music Library

To prepare for the first studio recording, Szell programmed the Second Symphony during the Cleveland Orchestra's tour of the eastern United States in early 1961. He resolved to record what would be considered a definitive interpretation of the work. During sessions for Epic Records on 26 February and 3 March 1961 the Cleveland Orchestra and Szell recorded the symphony. Before the recording was issued in 1962 an advance copy was sent to Walton, who sent Szell a letter of gratitude:

Words fail me! It is a quite fantastic and stupendous performance from every point of view. Firstly it is absolutely right musically speaking, and the virtuosity of the performance is quite staggering, especially the Fugato: but everything is phrased and balanced in an unbelievable way for which I must congratulate you and your magnificent orchestra.

When the recording was issued, Edward Greenfield of The Guardian found that the music, though lightweight, was more and more impressive on each rehearing, and could not have more persuasive advocates than Szell and his players. Both music and interpretation were praised by the Boston Globe, Los Angeles Times, and Sacramento Bee. The reviewer for The Sunday Oregonian said that the recording was a remarkable collaborative effort between composer, conductor, and orchestra. He added that Walton's Second Symphony was a "genuine contribution to [the 20th] century's music". Walton told the young composer Oliver Knussen in 1981 that the symphony had received:

the worst reception from the press that any work of mine ever had, in fact if it hadn't been for the Szell recording, the work, I believe, would never have been heard of again. So don't ever pay any attention to what the critics say.

The Penguin Guide to Recorded Classical Music comments that although the Second Symphony prompted Szell to direct the Cleveland Orchestra "in one of its most spectacular performances on record", Previn and the LSO "give another brilliant performance which in some ways gets closer to the heart of the music with its overtones of the composer’s romantic opera, Troilus and Cressida". The reviewer finds Previn "less literal than Szell, more sparkling in the outer movements, more warmly romantic in the central slow movement". The Gramophone reviewer of Gardner's 2015 recording called it "a superbly perceptive account ... a conspicuously insightful reading of this underrated score – arguably the most gripping to have come my way since Szell, Previn, and Mackerras.

== Notes, references and sources ==
=== Sources ===
- Burton, Humphrey; Murray, Maureen (2002). William Walton: The Romantic Loner – A Centenary Portrait Album. Oxford: Oxford University Press. ISBN 0-19-816235-9.
- Charry, Michael (2014). George Szell: A Life of Music. Champaign, Illinois: University of Illinois Press. ISBN 978-0-252-08003-6.
- Craggs, Stewart R. (1990). William Walton: A Catalogue. Oxford: Oxford University Press. ISBN 0-19-315474-9.
- Elwell, Herbert (30 December 1960). "Walton Symphony Pleases; So Does Druian". Cleveland Plain-Dealer. p. 15 – via Newspapers.com.
- Giroud, Vincent (2002). William Walton, Composer: A Centenary Exhibition in the Beinecke Rare Book & Manuscript Library, Yale University. New Haven, Connecticut: Beinecke Rare Book & Manuscript Library. ISBN 0-8457-3144-0.
- Harper-Scott, J. P. E. (2012). The Quilting Points of Musical Modernism: Revolution, Reaction, and William Walton. Cambridge University Press. ISBN 978-0-521-76521-3.
- Heyworth, Peter (4 September 1960). "Music and Musicians: Walton's New Symphony". The Observer. p. 24 – via Newspapers.com.
- Howes, Frank (1973). The Music of William Walton (2nd ed.). Oxford: Oxford University Press. ISBN 0-19-315431-5.
- Jenkins, Lyndon (1999). "The Recorded Works". In Stewart R. Craggs (ed.). William Walton: Music and Literature. Aldershot: Ashgate. ISBN 1-85928-190-7.
- Kennedy, Michael (1989). Portrait of Walton. Oxford: Oxford University Press. ISBN 978-0-19-816705-1.
- Lloyd, Stephen (2001). William Walton: Muse of Fire. Woodbridge, Suffolk: Boydell Press. ISBN 978-0-85115-803-7.
- March, Ivan; Edward Greenfield; Robert Layton; Paul Czajkowski (2008). The Penguin Guide to Recorded Classical Music 2009. London: Penguin. ISBN 978-0-141-03335-8.
- Matthew-Walker, Robert (July 2002). "Aspects of Walton's Second Symphony". Tempo (221). Cambridge University Press: 29–33. doi:10.1017/S0040298200015643. JSTOR 946780.
- Meikle, Robert (1999). "The Symphonies and Concertos". In Stewart R. Craggs (ed.). William Walton: Music and Literature. Aldershot: Ashgate. ISBN 1-85928-190-7.
- Northcott, Bayan (March 1982). "In Search of Walton". The Musical Times. 123 (1669). Musical Times Publications: 179–181, 183–184. doi:10.2307/961854. JSTOR 961854.
- Routh, Francis (1972). Contemporary British Music: The Twenty-five years from 1945 to 1970. London: Macdonald. ISBN 978-0-356-03773-8. OCLC 1357515878.
- Russell Hulme, David (2012). "Preface". In David Russell Hulme (ed.). William Walton: Symphony No. 2. Oxford: Oxford University Press. ISBN 978-0-19-339244-1.
- Salzman, Eric (12 February 1961). "View From Ischia: Italian Island Helps Walton Stand Aloof". The New York Times. p. X11. ProQuest 115356824.
- Schonberg, Harold C. (6 February 1961). "Music: Walton's Second". New York Times. p. 26. ProQuest 115388579.
- Tierney, Neil (1984). William Walton: His Life and Music. London: Robert Hale. ISBN 978-0-70-901784-4.
- Walton, Susana (1989). William Walton: Behind the Façade. Oxford: Oxford University Press. ISBN 978-0-19-282635-0.
