= String Quartet in A minor (Walton) =

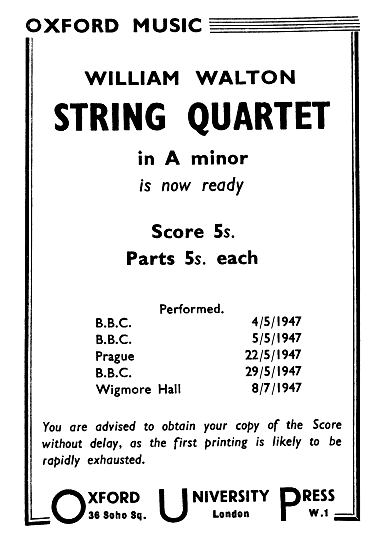
First edition, 1947

William Walton's String Quartet in A minor was his second work in the genre. He withdrew an early attempt, premiered in 1922, and wrote the A minor quartet between 1944 and 1947. It was first given in a BBC radio broadcast on 4 May 1947 and received its first public performance the following day.

In 1971, at the instigation of the conductor Neville Marriner, Walton orchestrated and revised the work as his Sonata for String Orchestra.

== Background ==
During the 1920s and 1930s Walton was primarily known for choral works including Belshazzar's Feast and orchestral works including two concertos and a symphony. He had written a string quartet and a piano quartet while in his teens, but he later dismissed the string quartet as "largely undigested Bartók and Schoenberg", and withdrew the piece. It was not until the late 1930s that Walton's thoughts turned again to the quartet form. The Second World War disrupted his musical plans, and most of his work between 1940 and 1945 consisted of ballet music for the touring Sadler's Wells Ballet and incidental music for films, radio and the theatre. But in September 1944, in response to an enquiry by Julian Herbage of the BBC's music department, Walton replied that a magnum opus was in preparation, in the form of a string quartet.

Walton seldom composed with facility and the quartet cost him a great deal of effort. He wrote to a colleague at the end of January 1945, "I'm in a suicidal struggle with four strings and am making no headway whatever. Brick walls, slit trenches, Siegfried Lines bristle as never before. I'm afraid I've done film music for too long!" A year later, still working on the piece, he wrote to his publisher, Alan Frank of the Oxford University Press, "I've now completed nearly three movements and it is irritating that I shall have to start on the Lear music on my return at the end of next week. (Note: The reference is to a proposed film of King Lear starring and directed by Laurence Olivier. The proposal came to nothing.) The quartet was nearing completion in late 1946 and the premiere was scheduled for 4 February 1947.

== Premiere ==
For neither the first time nor the last in Walton's career the premiere had to be postponed, (Note: The premieres of the First and Second Symphonies had to be postponed because the score was not ready in time.) and the work was first performed in a BBC studio and broadcast live on the Third Programme on 4 May 1947. The performers were the Blech Quartet (Harry Blech and Lionel Bentley (violins), Keith Cummings (viola) and Douglas Cameron (cello)). The following day the same players gave the first public performance, in the BBC's concert hall in Broadcasting House.

The work was dedicated to Ernest Irving, musical director of Ealing Studios, with whom Walton had worked on many film scores during the war. Irving wrote in his memoirs:

The Quartet which is dedicated to me has a lovely slow movement, somewhat unfashionable in these days of atonalism and twelve-tone scales, that will remind many of Brahms and Elgar. At the first performance by the Blech Quartet at the BBC Hall I sat beside the lovely lady who I think inspired it, and it now always sounds to me like an elegy. I have been told by my enemies that the last movement represents me, quarrelsome, disputatious, didactic and violent; but as I do not admit any of these adjectives, I take a more good-humoured view of the music.

The "lovely lady" mentioned by Irving was Walton's partner, Alice Wimborne, who died within a year of the premiere. The critic Stephen Lloyd writes, "In hindsight one can only agree with Irving: the lento, deeply elegiac, is one of Walton's most tender outpourings".

== Publication ==
The score was first published by the Oxford University Press (OUP) in September 1947. Walton having withdrawn his first string quartet, the new work was titled "String Quartet in A minor", rather than "String Quartet No. 2". The early quartet was not published in Walton's lifetime, (Note: It was first published, by the Oxford University Press, in 2008.) and the 1947 quartet remained unnumbered. For the OUP's comprehensive Walton Edition in 2008, Hugh Macdonald edited a new edition of the score. That edition retained the title "String Quartet in A minor", rather than "String Quartet No. 2".

== Music ==
In his study of Walton's music, the critic Frank Howes writes that although the String Quartet caused the composer much difficulty in composition:

There is no sign of strain in it, for it is actually the most conventional in behaviour of all Walton’s instrumental compositions. It belongs to the family of Beethoven rather than Bartók, though the medium is used forcefully. It is in the usual four movements, it professes to be in a key – A minor – and does not seek to obscure tonality or to assert it with pedal points; the first movement is cast in a pretty regular sonata form; the finale is a rondo.

=== I. Allegro ===
The opening is a winding modal sixteen-bar melody for the viola, with a counter-melody for the second violin, taken up by the other two players. The second-subject is quicker, described by the commentator Roger Parker as "stuttering and febrile". The development section begins with the first theme in a new contrapuntal setting, developing into an emphatic fugato and ends in tremolos and trills. The recapitulation begins with a version of the first theme and reiterates the second subject group. The coda builds the first theme into a climax, and concludes with echoes of the second.

=== II. Presto ===
Walton did not label this movement as a scherzo but commentators including Howes, Parker and Anthony Burton have described it as such. It is in a modal E minor and a one-in-a-bar 3/4 metre, continually driving. Commentators have heard the movement differently: Parker writes of "a sense of obsession" resembling "Bartók at his most ferocious"; writing just after the premiere, Robin Hull commented on "a sinewy brilliance which acts as a light but well-chosen foil to the preceding Allegro"; for Neil Tierney it is "short and brilliantly witty, virile and alert ... which conjures up a fairy-dance atmosphere".

=== III. Lento ===
The slow movement is in a clear sonata form in F major and it begins and ends on a chord of F. Its first subject is a long-breathed melody, and the second is introduced by a syncopated cello pizzicato followed by a viola solo. The composer’s biographer Michael Kennedy has written, "the gem of the quartet is its dark third movement ... in which Walton achieves an emotional poise that testifies to his maturity as artist and man". Parker writes, "After some remarkably adventurous tonal wanderings, the final moments return to F major; in a beautiful coda, shards of the opening’s viola melody reappear; but perhaps peace is found at the last".

=== IV. Allegro molto ===
The main theme of the finale is a very fast rondo. There is a central episode with an extended lyrical melody, characteristic of Walton, and developed into a canon in a way representative of the composer's liking for counterpoint.

== Reception ==
The work was well received. After the premiere Desmond Shawe-Taylor welcomed "the familiar blend of harmonic astringency, rhythmic and contrapuntal ingenuity, and nostalgic meditation". For Kennedy:

[T]here is a new mood. The haunting self-communing that is in most of Walton’s music is here of a deeper cast, less Angst-ridden but no less deeply felt. ... It is one of his finest achievements and it was a sure sign that he had thrown off the trammels of his cinema style and rediscovered his true voice in an intensive self-exploration".

== Sonata for String Orchestra ==
In 1970, the conductor Neville Marriner asked Walton to write a new work for strings for his Academy of St Martin in the Fields. Walton, always cautious about taking on new commissions, declined to attempt a new work, and Marriner suggested instead a version for full string orchestra of the String Quartet. Walton agreed to this, and in September and October 1971 he reworked the piece as his Sonata for String Orchestra. His friend and colleague Malcolm Arnold had offered to arrange the piece, under Walton's supervision, but when he arrived at Walton's house in Ischia most of the work was done, and there was only the finale left for Arnold to work on.

In making the transcription Walton made changes to the first movement, shortening and rewriting several sections. He assigned a proportion of the material throughout the work to the solo front-desk players, which, Burton comments, "turns the work almost into a concerto grosso in the tradition of earlier English string pieces by Elgar, Vaughan Williams, and Tippett, and before them Handel".

The Sonata was first performed by Marriner and the Academy on tour in Perth, Australia, on 2 March 1972. The British premiere was at the Bath International Music Festival on 27 May 1972, and the first London performance was at the Mansion House on 11 July.

== Notes, references and sources ==
=== Sources ===
- Burton, Anthony (2011). Walton String Quartets. Colchester: Chandos Records. OCLC 811453804.
- Burton, Anthony (2018). Walton Viola Concerto, Partita for Orchestra, Sonata for String Orchestra. Colchester: Chandos Records. OCLC 1223518053.
- Craggs, Stewart R. (1990). William Walton: A Catalogue. Oxford: Oxford University Press. ISBN 978-0-19-315474-2.
- Howes, Frank (1973). The Music of William Walton (second ed.). London: Oxford University Press. ISBN 978-0-19-315431-5.
- Hull, Robin (1948). "New Music". In Ralph Hill (ed.). Penguin Music Magazine, VI. London: Penguin. OCLC 951416117.
- Irving, Ernest (1959). Cue for Music. London: Denis Dobson. OCLC 1166805.
- Kennedy, Michael (1989). Portrait of Walton. Oxford: Oxford University Press. ISBN 978-0-19-816705-1.
- Lloyd, Stephen (2002). William Walton: Muse of Fire. Woodbridge: Boydell. ISBN 978-0-85115-803-7.
- Parker, Roger (2022). Walton, Shostakovich. London: Signum Records. OCLC 1370121877.
- Tierney, Neil (1984). William Walton: His Life and Music. London: Robert Hale. ISBN 978-0-70-901784-4.
