= As You Like It (Walton) =

William Walton's compositions from the 1930s to the 1960s included incidental music for fourteen films. His score for the 1936 film of As You Like It has been arranged for concert hall and recording studio purposes by Carl Davis (1986) and Christopher Palmer (1989).

== Background ==
By the mid-1930s William Walton was an established composer, known for works including Façade, the overture Portsmouth Point, the Viola Concerto, the cantata Belshazzar's Feast and the recently completed First Symphony. After the considerable effort of completing the symphony he was advised by the critic Ernest Newman to avoid embarking on another major work for a year or two and "keep his hand in with trifles". Turning to less demanding and more remunerative work, Walton wrote his first film score (for Paul Czinner's Escape Me Never) and collaborated with Osbert Sitwell and Frederick Ashton on a short ballet for Charles B. Cochran's 1936 revue, Follow the Sun.

== Music ==
Czinner asked Walton to write the music for a second film, As You Like It, starring Elisabeth Bergner and Laurence Olivier, which premiered at the Carlton Theatre, Haymarket, London on 3 September 1936. The music was recorded by the London Philharmonic Orchestra, conducted by Efrem Kurtz.

Walton's music is scored for 2 flutes (second doubling piccolo), 2 oboes, 2 clarinets in B♭, bass clarinet in B♭, bassoon, 4 horns in F, 2 trumpets in B♭, percussion (glockenspiel, marimba, tubular bells, large cymbal, small cymbals, tabors, suspended cymbals, gong, jingles, side-drum, triangle, and church bells), piano and strings, with mixed chorus.

The film included Shakespeare's song "Tell Me Where is Fancy Bred", imported from The Merchant of Venice, but excluded the song "Under the Greenwood Tree" from As You Like It, which Walton set before the director cut it. The film was not a great success, and Walton's music was generally forgotten during the composer's lifetime. The young Benjamin Britten, in a review for World Film News in October 1936, wrote:

That the Directors of 20th Century Fox Film Corporation should have invited one of the 20th century stars of British music to write for one of its biggest productions is very creditable indeed. But the invitation seems to have exhausted their enterprise. His name, perhaps symbolically, is absent from the programme, and the opportunities he has had for writing serious film music seem negligible.

Walton generally disapproved of playing his film music out of its intended context. He said, "Film music is not good film music if it can be used for any other purpose", but after his death numerous arrangements of his film scores were made. In 1986 Carl Davis extracted a seven-movement suite from the As You Like It score, and in 1989 Christopher Palmer arranged some of the music into a continuous five-section "Poem for Orchestra", with solo singer in the "Under the Greenwood Tree" section.

== 1986 suite ==
Davis's suite comprises:

1. Title music [3:06]
2. Fountain Scene – Wrestling Scene [4:40]
3. Sunrise [0:38]
4. Procession [1:41]
5. Snake Scene [1:00]
6. Waterfall Scene [2:36]
7. Hymn [with chorus, 0:56]

Davis recorded the suite with the London Philharmonic in 1986 and their recording was issued the following year. The timings, above, are from that recording.

== 1989 "Poem for Orchestra" ==
Palmer's arrangement of the music is in five continuous sections:

1. Prelude [2:25]
2. Moonlight [2:39]
3. Under the Greenwood Tree [with soprano solo, 1:56]
4. The Fountain [3:12]
5. Wedding Procession [1:51]

This version was first recorded by the Academy of St Martin in the Fields directed by Sir Neville Marriner in 1989, released the following year. A second recording was made in 1995 by the RTÉ Concert Orchestra conducted by Andrew Penny. The timings, above, are from the 1989 recording.

== Sources ==
- Craggs, Stewart R. (1990). William Walton: A Catalogue. Oxford: Oxford University Press. ISBN 0-19-315474-9.
- Kennedy, Michael (1989). Portrait of Walton. Oxford: Oxford University Press. ISBN 978-0-19-816705-1.
- Lloyd, Stephen (2002). William Walton: Muse of Fire. Woodbridge: Boydell. ISBN 978-0-85115-803-7.
