= Suite from Henry V =

Music from the 1944 film "Henry V"

William Walton's music for the 1944 film Henry V has been arranged by several musicians for non-cinematic performances. The first suite was arranged in 1945 by the conductor Malcolm Sargent. In 1963 Muir Mathieson, who had conducted the music for the original film soundtrack, arranged a longer suite, and in 1988 the musicologist Christopher Palmer constructed an hour-long "Shakespeare Scenario" using most of the music Walton composed for the film.

== Background ==
Henry V was the tenth film for which Walton composed incidental music. He had begun in 1935 with a score for Paul Czinner's Escape Me Never, and his later cinema scores included his first Shakespeare film, As You Like It (1936), which starred Laurence Olivier. When Olivier was planning his film of Henry V his co-producer, Dallas Bower, suggested that Walton should write the music, and Olivier agreed. The importance of Walton's score to the success of the film was widely recognised, and Olivier later called it "the most wonderful score I've ever heard on a film".

Walton was doubtful of the value of film music when heard without the screen images it was written to accompany. He said, "Film music is not good film music if it can be used for any other purpose". But he was prepared to make exceptions. In 1942 he had extracted the Spitfire Prelude and Fugue from his score for The First of the Few, and from Henry V he allowed two self-contained sections of the score to be played in concert: the passacaglia "Death of Falstaff" and "Touch Her Soft Lips and Part", both for strings only. Writing of the former, Hubert Clifford wrote in Tempo magazine, "This music moves with a simple dignity and a restrained pathos". Walton conducted the Philharmonia Orchestra in a recording of the two, issued by HMV in 1946.

For Henry V Walton mostly avoided pastiche of ancient music, but drew on a few old sources to add period atmosphere. The musicologist Christopher Palmer lists the three principal ones:

- The Fitzwilliam Virginal Book is a source for the scenes set in Shakespeare's London: at the Globe Theatre and the Boar's Head. In the Prologue the chorus has a heavily revised version of "Rosa Solis", by Giles Farnaby. The death of Falstaff draws on an anonymous drinking-song, "Watkin's Ale", transformed from brisk major key to elegiac minor.
- From Joseph Canteloube's Chants d'Auvergne Walton drew on three melodies for the scenes at the French court. "Obal, din lou Limouzi", "Baïlerò" and "L'Antouèno".
- At the suggestion of Ralph Vaughan Williams Walton also drew on two old French tunes: "Réveillez-vous Piccars" – a 15th-century battle-song – and the well-known "Agincourt Carol". (Note: Vaughan Williams had earlier used both songs in his own Henry V, a work for brass band written in 1933–34 though not published until 1979.)

== 1945 suite, arranged by Malcolm Sargent ==
In 1945, with the composer's approval, Malcolm Sargent incorporated the two string movements into a four-movement suite for orchestra with chorus. It consists of:

1. Overture
2. Passacaglia ("Death of Falstaff")
3. "Touch Her Soft Lips and Part"
4. Agincourt Carol.

The first studio recording of the suite was made in 1986 by the London Philharmonic Orchestra and London Philharmonic Choir, conducted by Carl Davis. The suite is scored for 3 flutes (two doubling piccolo), 2 oboes, 1 cor anglais, 3 clarinets, 2 bassoons, 4 horns, 3 trumpets, 3 trombones, tuba, timpani, percussion, harp, harpsichord and strings.

In 1946, HMV recorded excerpts from the film script, spoken by Laurence Olivier, who had directed and starred in the film. The composer conducted the Philharmonia in the accompanying music. This recording was reissued on compact disc by EMI Classics in 2002.

== 1963 suite, arranged by Muir Mathieson ==
In 1963 Muir Mathieson, who had conducted on the original film soundtrack, arranged a longer, purely orchestral suite. His arrangement calls for 2 flutes (both doubling piccolo), 2 oboes (one doubling cor anglais), 2 clarinets, 2 bassoons, 4 horns, 2 trumpets, 3 trombones, 1 tuba (optional), timpani, percussion, harp and strings. This suite was published by the OUP in 1969. It consists of:

1. Overture
2. Passacaglia ("Death of Falstaff")
3. Charge and Battle
4. "Touch Her Soft Lips and Part"
5. Agincourt Carol.

Comparing the two suites, the composer's biographer Michael Kennedy writes:

Sargent's, although it omits the Charge and the 'Baïlerò', is the better. It begins with the splendid music that opens the film, when a flute solo accompanies the shot of a playbill fluttering in the wind before the camera shows a panorama of sixteenth century London, closing in on the Globe itself. Wordless voices are used with magnificent effect. Like Mathieson's suite, Sargent's ends with the stirring arrangement of the traditional Agincourt Song but in its more effective choral version.

== 1988 "Shakespeare Scenario" ==
In 1988 Christopher Palmer constructed what he called "Henry V: A Shakespeare Scenario" for orchestra and narrator, from Walton's score and Shakespeare's words. It expands considerably on the Sargent and Matheson arrangements, and has a playing time of around an hour. The sections are:

- Prologue
- Interlude: At the Boar's Head
- Embarkation
- Interlude: "Touch Her Soft Lips and Part"
- Harfleur
- The Night Watch
- "Upon the King"
- Agincourt
- Interlude: At the French Court
- Epilogue

The first performance was given at the Royal Festival Hall, London in May 1990. The narrator was Christopher Plummer, and the music was performed by the orchestra and chorus of the Academy of St Martin in the Fields, conducted by Sir Neville Marriner. The same performers recorded the work a few days later for Chandos Records.

== Recordings ==
The 1963 suite arranged by Mathieson has been the most frequently recorded. The first recording, made for Columbia in 1963, was by the Philharmonia conducted by Walton. Subsequent recordings have been conducted by Sir Charles Groves, André Previn, Charles Gerhardt, James Judd and Andrew Litton.

After its first recording there have been issues of the 1988 "Scenario" conducted by Andrew Penny and Leonard Slatkin, with Anton Lesser and Michael Sheen sharing the narration in the former version, (Note: Sheen is the voice of King Henry and Lesser voices all the other characters.) and Samuel West as narrator in the latter.

== Notes, references and sources ==
=== Sources ===
- Kennedy, Michael (1989). Portrait of Walton. Oxford: Oxford University Press. ISBN 978-0-19-816705-1.
