= Scapino (disambiguation) =

Scapino is a stock character in the commedia dell'arte

Scapino may also refer to:

- Scapino (play), a 1974 play by Frank Dunlop and Jim Dale
- Scapino (Walton), a 1941 comedy overture by William Walton
