= Siesta (Walton) =

Siesta is a short piece for small orchestra, written by William Walton and premiered in 1926. It was later used for a ballet by Frederick Ashton. Walton was a devotee of Italy, and its influence is apparent in this work.

== Background ==
In 1926 William Walton was in the early stages of his composing career. He had come to public notice with the music for Façade (1923) and Portsmouth Point (1925). He had visited Italy with his friends and patrons the Sitwells in 1920, and said it "changed my whole attitude about life and music". His biographer Michael Kennedy and the musicologist Christopher Palmer both consider that Italy had a lasting effect on the composer's music. Palmer writes that a Mediterranean or Latin quality is pervasive in Walton's work, and in Siesta explicitly refers to Italy – "an Italian street-scene drawn or sketched in deftly evocative strokes".

Despite the Italian setting, Walton wrote Siesta while staying at Haus Hirth, near Munich. The piece is dedicated to his friend Stephen Tennant. It was first performed at the Aeolian Hall, London on 24 November 1926 by the Aeolian Hall Chamber Orchestra conducted by the composer in one of a series of chamber concerts presented by Guy Warrack. Walton made a transcription of the piece for piano four hands in 1928, and lightly revised the original orchestral work in 1962.

== Structure ==
Siesta takes about five minutes in performance. It opens with a gently undulating figure in the lower strings and the woodwind. In the more richly scored centre of the work, the horns play an Italian street song in E major, before the return of the opening theme. Towards the end Walton introduces mild dissonances and the work ends with a particularly dissonant pizzicato chord, smoothed by an A sustained by violas and oboe.

== Ballet ==
Frederick Ashton used Walton's score as the basis of his 1936 Siesta – a Pas de deux, first given at Sadler's Wells Theatre, London, with Robert Helpmann and Pearl Argyle as principals. It preceded a performance of Ashton's Façade ballet. Ashton later produced Siesta – a new Pas de deux, presented on 28 July 1972 at the Aldeburgh Festival with Vyvyan Lorrayne and Barry McGrath as principals, as part of a seventieth birthday tribute to Walton.

== Recordings ==
- London Philharmonic Orchestra, William Walton, 1938
- London Philharmonic Orchestra, Sir Adrian Boult, 1954
- London Philharmonic Orchestra, Sir William Walton, 1970
- London Philharmonic Orchestra, Sir Charles Mackerras, 1989
- London Philharmonic Orchestra, Bryden Thomson, 1990
- English Northern Philharmonia, David Lloyd-Jones, 2001

Source: Walton Trust.

== References and sources ==
=== Sources ===
- Howes, Frank (1973). The Music of William Walton (second ed.). London: Oxford University Press. ISBN 978-0-19-315431-5.
- Kennedy, Michael (1989). Portrait of Walton. Oxford: Oxford University Press. ISBN 978-0-19-816705-1.
- Tierney, Neil (1984). William Walton: His Life and Music. London: Robert Hale. ISBN 978-0-70-901784-4.
