= Prelude for Orchestra (Walton) =

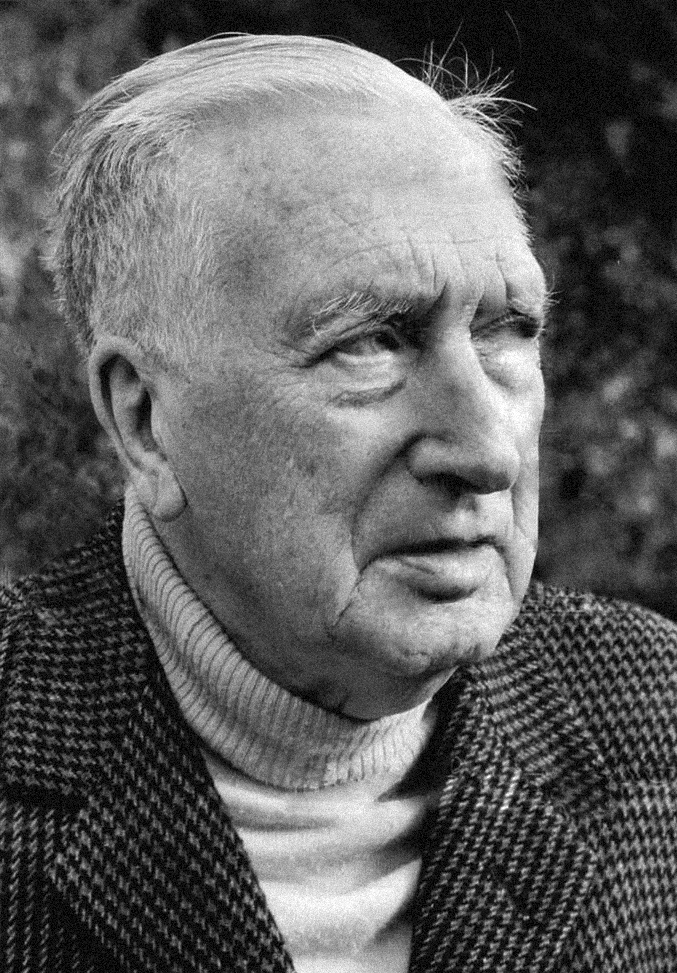
William Walton in 1976

The Prelude for orchestra is an orchestral piece by William Walton.

Walton received a commission for an original composition from Granada Television in June 1961. Walton delivered the work in August 1962 as Granada Prelude, Call Signs and End Music. However, the music was never used by Granada. The company turned the piece over to Gilbert Vinter to convert the prelude into a march for symphonic wind band. With Vinter's arrangement, it was transmitted at the beginning of each day's broadcast from 1965 until September 1973.

The work features stretches of piano or pianissimo scoring allowing announcements to be superimposed. Walton also included a "big tune", similar to ones found in Crown Imperial, Orb and Sceptre, and the Spitfire Prelude.

== Music sections and duration ==
The following information is according to Oxford University Press:

- Prelude 5 minutes
- Call Sign # 1 Festivo 4 seconds
- Call Sign # 2a Pomposo 4 seconds
- Call Sign # 2b Pomposo 3 seconds
- Call Sign # 3 Pastorale 4 seconds
- Call Sign # 4 Comico 3 seconds
- Call Sign # 5 Alla caccia 3 seconds
- Call Sign # 6 Music hall 4 seconds
- Call Sign # 7 Military 4 seconds
- Call Sign # 8 Military 4 seconds
- Call Sign # 9 Acrobat 3 seconds
- Call Sign # 10 All'espagnola 4 seconds
- Call Sign # 11 Dance band 4 seconds
- Call Sign # 12 Singing strings 4 seconds
- Call Sign # 13 Singing strings 4 seconds
- Call Sign # 14 Singing strings 4 seconds
- Call Sign # 15 Allegrissimo 4 seconds
- End Music 21 seconds

== Instrumentation ==
Instrumentation is three flutes (third doubling piccolo), three oboes (third doubling cor anglais), three clarinets, two bassoons, contrabassoon, four horns, three trumpets, three trombones, tuba, timpani, three percussion, harp, and strings.

== Score publications ==
The march for concert band as arranged by Vinter was published by Oxford University Press as a 26-page score in 1973. The orchestral version is included in the publisher's William Walton Edition volume 17 Shorter Orchestral Works 1 (2007).

== First public performance ==
Although he composed nothing new for the Silver Jubilee of Elizabeth II in 1977, Walton did release for public performance his original orchestral version of the Prelude for Orchestra. This first performance was on Saturday 25 June 1977, with James Blair conducting the Young Musicians’ Symphony Orchestra in St. John's, Smith Square, London.

== Recordings ==
Bryden Thomson conducted the work in 1991 with the London Philharmonic Orchestra for Chandos Records. Major R.J. Owen conducted the band version in 2002 with the Scots Guards Band for the Specialist Recording Company.
