= Partita for Orchestra =

1957 orchestral composition by William Walton

William Walton's Partita for Orchestra is a three-movement work for large orchestra, composed for, dedicated to and first performed by the Cleveland Orchestra and its conductor George Szell. The work was composed in 1957 and premiered on 30 January 1958.

== Background and first performances ==
In the 1940s Walton had been among the composers from whom the Chicago Symphony Orchestra had commissioned a work to mark its fiftieth anniversary; his contribution was the Scapino comedy overture. Towards the end of 1955 the Cleveland Orchestra invited him, and nine other composers, to write a piece for its fortieth anniversary season in 1958. (Note: The other nine were Boris Blacher, Paul Creston, Henri Dutilleux, Gottfried von Einem, Alvin Etler, Howard Hanson, Bohuslav Martinů, Peter Mennin and Robert Moevs.) Before starting work on the piece he had to complete two other commissioned works, and he was further delayed by injuries in a car crash in early 1957, but he finally began the Cleveland work in April of that year and completed it in October.

Walton decided on a quasi-symphonic form, in three movements. As the work was to be extrovert and not over-serious he avoided calling it a symphony or sinfonietta and designated it a partita; he borrowed from the 18th-century partita the idea of beginning with a toccata and ending with a gigue. As a central movement he wrote a siciliana. At George Szell's request he provided a programme note for the premiere, (Note: According to Frank Howes and Michael Kennedy Walton wrote the note, but in a 2018 analysis of the piece Anthony Burton suggests that some of it may have been ghost-written by his publisher, Alan Frank.) in which he commented:

… my Partita poses no problems, has no ulterior motive or meaning behind it, and makes no attempt to ponder the imponderables. I have written it in the hope that it may be enjoyed straight off, without any preliminary probing into the score. I have also written it with the wonderful players of the Cleveland Orchestra in mind, hoping that they may enjoy playing it. If either of these two hopes is fulfilled, I shall be more than happy.

Szell and the orchestra gave the first performance of the work in Severance Hall, Cleveland on 30 January 1958, followed by performances elsewhere in the US. They recorded the piece in 1962. The first British performance was given by the Hallé Orchestra in Manchester on 30 April 1958, conducted by the composer. Sir John Barbirolli conducted the Hallé in the first London performance two days later.

== Music ==
The work is dedicated to Szell and the Cleveland Orchestra. It is scored for three flutes (third doubling piccolo), two oboes, cor anglais, three clarinets (third doubling bass clarinet), three bassoons (third doubling contrabassoon) – four horns, three trumpets, three trombones, tuba – timpani, four percussion (snare drum, military drum, bass drum, cymbals, tambourine, castanets, triangle, glockenspiel, xylophone, vibraphone) – celeste – harp – strings. The playing time is typically between 15 and 17½ minutes.

=== I. Toccata ===
The lively opening movement, marked "brioso" (spirited) is mainly in 3/2 time, interspersed with bars of 2/2 and 4/2. There are three main themes, all, in the words of the analyst Anthony Burton, "of loose-limbed athleticism". The first is for the oboes and first violins; the second, slightly the slowest of the three, is for the first violins with cor anglais and clarinets. In 18th-century toccatas an important element was the effect of repeated notes of equal length, and Walton here maintains a quaver motion throughout the movement, except for a quiet central episode.

=== II. Pastorale Siciliana ===
Walton intended the slow movement, marked andante comodo, to be "a complete contrast in mood and texture" with the outer movements. It is described by his biographer Michael Kennedy as "time for siesta, with wistful romantic dreams and languorous looks…". The rhythms are a lilting 9/8 and 6/8 . The movement opens with an unaccompanied duet for oboe and viola and later features other solos from bassoon, clarinet, trumpet and horn. There follows "a sharp rhythmic dialogue at a slightly faster tempo", which Burton finds a brief surfacing of a "sense of unease" latent throughout the movement. The movement draws to a quiet conclusion "smiling and poignant at the same time".

=== III. Giga Burlesca ===
The final movement, a "burlesque gigue", marked allegro gioviale, is a rondo in 9/8 and 6/8 . It begins with a bustling introduction, followed, in Burton's phrase, by "a carefree string melody and an uproarious horn idea [and] a solo trumpet tune of catchy simplicity". The main theme is "a deliciously vulgar tune", according to Kennedy and "in Walton's best vulgar manner of Façade" according to the analyst Frank Howes. The themes are repeated and continue into an exuberant coda. Walton told his publisher that in the uproarious vulgarity of the finale he was "sailing far too near the wind" but it would, he hoped, not only "make a rousing and diverting finish", but also annoy puritanical music critics such as "P.H. and D.M." (Peter Heyworth of The Observer and Donald Mitchell, who wrote for various musical journals).

== Critical reception ==
Walton's prediction that Peter Heyworth would dislike the work proved well founded: Heyworth pronounced it lacking in melodic invention, with "garish and banal" orchestration. Other reviews were highly favourable. A Cleveland music critic thought the work "masterfully orchestrated … filled with boisterous blasts of colour and sturdy uninhibited tunes", The Manchester Guardian found it "exhilarating" and "first rate", The Daily Telegraph thought it "witty" and "captivating", and The Times judged it "a brilliant, entertaining work that has no close parallel in the modern repertory".

Later critics have also praised the work. In 2002, Hilary Finch of The Times called the Partita "crackling with craft and confidence, and with a quizzical, sun-kissed Pastorale Siciliana at its heart, fragrantly led by solo viola and oboe". In 2017 the music critic of The Sunday Times, Hugh Canning, called the Partita "among Walton's most striking pieces – sheer pizzazz is the keynote".

== Recordings ==
Orchestra	Conductor	Year
Philharmonia Orchestra	Sir William Walton	1959
Cleveland Orchestra	George Szell	1959
New Zealand Symphony Orchestra	Sir William Walton	1964
London Philharmonic Orchestra	Leonard Slatkin	1990
London Philharmonic Orchestra	Bryden Thomson	1991
English Northern Philharmonia	Paul Daniel	1994
BBC Scottish Symphony Orchestra	Martyn Brabbins	2017
BBC Symphony Orchestra	Edward Gardner	2018

== Notes, references and sources ==
=== Sources ===
- Howes, Frank (1973). The Music of William Walton (second ed.). London: Oxford University Press. ISBN 978-0-19-315431-5.
- Kennedy, Michael (1989). Portrait of Walton. Oxford: Oxford University Press. ISBN 978-0-19-816705-1.
