= The First Shoot =

Claire Luce and Frederick Ashton in the 1936 ballet

The First Shoot is a short ballet suite by William Walton. It was composed for Charles B. Cochran's 1936 revue Follow the Sun, to a scenario by Osbert Sitwell with choreography by Frederick Ashton, who danced the lead role. The ballet was a spoof of upper-class Edwardian country house parties. Walton later rearranged the score for brass band, a version subsequently orchestrated for full symphony orchestra by Christopher Palmer.

== Background and production ==
By the mid-1930s William Walton was an established composer, known for works including Façade, the overture Portsmouth Point, the Viola Concerto, the cantata Belshazzar's Feast and the recently completed First Symphony. After the considerable effort of completing the symphony he was advised by the critic Ernest Newman to avoid embarking on another major work for a year or two and "keep his hand in with trifles". Turning to less demanding and more remunerative work, Walton wrote his first film score (for Paul Czinner's Escape Me Never) and collaborated with Osbert Sitwell – with whom he had collaborated on Belshazzar's Feast – on a short ballet for Charles B. Cochran's 1936 revue, Follow the Sun. The choreography was by Frederick Ashton, who, like Sitwell, had worked with Walton before – in his case on the ballet version of Façade.

Sitwell's scenario was a mock-tragedy, set in the Edwardian era. It depicted a country-house shooting party – the first of the season – hosted by Lord de Fontenoy, who has recently married the musical comedy star Connie Winsome. The ballet opens with a dance for six of "Mr Cochran's young ladies" dressed as pheasants. Lady de Fontenoy enters, followed by her admirer, Lord Charles Canterbury. They are interrupted by the rest of the party, who march round, firing in the air, and then dance off to luncheon. Lord Charles lingers, fires at another bird, and accidentally shoots Lady de Fontenoy. She dies in his arms, "to the intense interest of the other guests" according to Sitwell's scenario.

The costumes and scenery were by Cecil Beaton and the three leading roles were danced by Ashton, Claire Luce and, as Lord de Fontenoy, Robert Linden. Ashton took the role of Lord Charles for the first weeks of the run in the absence of the advertised star, Nick Long Jr., who was delayed, filming in Hollywood.

The revue previewed in Manchester on 23 December 1935. Most of the music was by Arthur Schwartz; Frank Collinson, the musical director of the show, singled out Walton's nine-minute score as "very amusing ... of the same general character and genre as Façade". The planned London opening was postponed because West End theatres shut for a week as a mark of respect after the death of George V on 20 January 1936. Follow the Sun opened at the Royal Adelphi Theatre on 4 February, and ran until 27 June.

== Music ==
The music for the ballet was thought lost after the run of the revue, but in 1980, Collinson, the conductor of the 1936 show, found it. This was good news for Walton, who had been asked to write a piece for brass band and found the re-emergence of the ballet score "a godsend". With the help of the brass band specialist Elgar Howarth he re-arranged the music for the Grimethorpe Colliery Band who recorded the work for television in December 1980 and took it to the Proms the following year for its first public performance. Numerous other brass bands have since taken the work up. In 1991 Christopher Palmer arranged the score for full orchestra, trying "to preserve something of the characteristically tart brass-band flavour".

The suite, in both the brass band and symphony orchestra versions, has five movements. The timings below are from the Chandos recording of the latter (1991):

1. Giocoso [1:35]
2. Andantino [0:52]
3. A tempo di "Hesitation Waltz" [2:10]
4. A tempo, subito Vivace [3:06]
5. Vivace [1:34]

Walton twice reused the waltz: first in his incidental music for Went the Day Well? (1942) and then for Three Sisters (1969). According to Stephen Lloyd in a 2001 study of Walton, "The nine-minute suite has a disarming tongue-in-cheek air of nonchalance (the third piece is directed "a tempo di 'Hesitation Waltz'), mixed with an element of what Walton excelled at, parody".

== Sources ==
- Craggs, Stewart R. (1990). William Walton: A Catalogue. Oxford: Oxford University Press. ISBN 978-0-19-315474-2.
- Kennedy, Michael (1989). Portrait of Walton. Oxford: Oxford University Press. ISBN 978-0-19-816705-1.
- Lloyd, Stephen (2002). William Walton: Muse of Fire. Woodbridge: Boydell. ISBN 978-0-85115-803-7.
