= William Walton: film music =

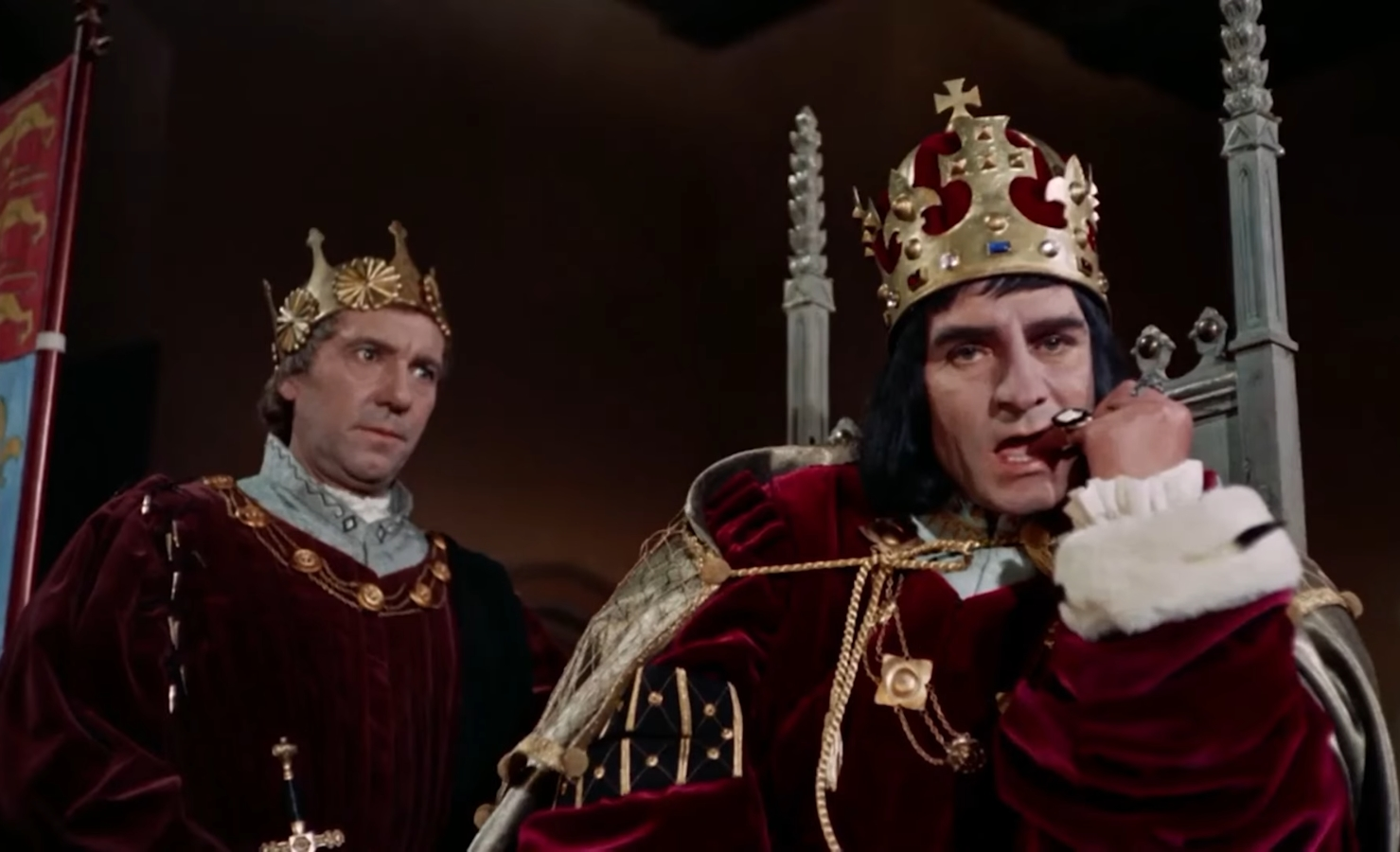
Richard III, 1955, for which Walton composed his twelfth film score

The English composer William Walton wrote the music for fourteen films between 1934 and 1969. He often had the musical assistance of Hyam Greenbaum and later Roy Douglas who orchestrated short sections of the music under Walton's supervision.

In general, Walton disapproved of the performance of his film music in the concert hall or on record: "Film music is not good film music if it can be used for any other purpose". But he was willing to make limited exceptions, and he allowed concert and recorded performances of some of his film music, notably that for Henry V, Hamlet and Richard III. For EMI he conducted the suites Muir Mathieson arranged from the first and third of these scores. After Walton's death the musicologist Christopher Palmer constructed suites from several others of his film scores.

== Escape Me Never ==
- Composed 1934.
- Studio orchestra conducted by Hyam Greenbaum. Film first shown: London Pavilion, 14 October 1935.

Walton arranged the music for the ballet scene of the film for solo piano in 1935. In 1990 Palmer arranged a three-movement suite from the score:

1. Prelude and Venetian Idyll
2. In the Dolomites
3. Ballet

== As You Like It ==
- Composed 1936
- London Philharmonic Orchestra conducted by Efrem Kurtz. Film first shown: Carlton, Haymarket, London, 3 September 1936.

A voice and piano arrangement of the song "Under the Greenwood Tree" (composed for, but not used in, the film) was published in 1936 and an arrangement for unison voices was published the following year. In 1986 Carl Davis extracted a seven-movement orchestra suite from the film score:

1. Title Music
2. Fountain scene – Wrestling scene
3. Sunrise
4. Procession
5. Snake Scene
6. Waterfall Scene
7. Hymn, "Now there is joy in Heaven" (chorus and orchestra)

In 1989 Palmer, adding the original setting of "Under the Greenwood Tree" for soprano and orchestra, arranged music from the film into "A Poem for Orchestra, after Shakespeare":

1. Prelude
2. Moonlight
3. Under the Greenwood Tree
4. The Fountain
5. Wedding Procession

== Dreaming Lips ==
- Composed 1937.
- London Symphony Orchestra conducted by Boyd Neel. Film first shown: London Pavilion, 11 October 1937.

In his chapter on Walton's film music in the 1999 William Walton: Music and Literature, Stephen Lloyd writes that the soundtrack contains little of Walton's own music: "The title music is built largely out of a theme from the Beethoven Concerto, and the only music of interest is found in a brief passage when the husband is ill and in a dream sequence that follows".

== Stolen Life ==
- Composed 1938.
- BBC Television Orchestra conducted by Hyam Greenbaum. Film first shown: Plaza, London, 18 January 1939.

Lloyd comments, "In A Stolen Life Walton was able to offer a rather more substantial score, the most dramatic moment being the extensive storm sequence in which Sylvia drowns. Here Walton provides music to match the force and ferocity of Sibelius's Tempest Prelude".

== Major Barbara ==
- Composed 1940.
- London Symphony Orchestra conducted by Muir Mathieson. Film first shown: Nassau, Bahamas, 21 March 1941: Odeon, Leicester Square London, 4 August 1941.

Palmer writes that as well as a distinguished cast, the film had "a distinguished Walton score, from which nothing was ever extracted for independent use". Palmer arranged some of the music into what he called a "Shavian Sequence", in four sections played continuously:

1. Titles. "Onward Christian Soldiers" and a romantic theme for Barbara and Adolphus.
2. Undershaft's factory and his garden suburb.
3. Love-scene. The last scene between Wendy and Adolphus, with a warm, sostenuto treatment of the love-theme.
4. End Titles and Play-Out. A fortissimo reprise of the love-theme

== The Next of Kin ==
- Composed 1941.
- Studio orchestra conducted by Ernest Irving. Film first shown: Curzon Theatre. London, January 1942 (invited audience). Public showing: London Pavilion, 15 May 1942.

No independent music was extracted from this score in the composer's lifetime. Palmer writes:

Walton's music for ... Went the Day Well?, Next of Kin, and The Foreman Went to France has remained almost completely unknown, one reason being that there is so little of it. The film-makers evidently feared that too much music on the soundtrack would detract from the "realism" at which they were aiming.

== The Foreman Went to France ==
- Composed 1941–42.
- Studio orchestra conducted by Ernest Irving. Film first shown: London Pavilion, 11 April 1942.

== The First of the Few ==
- Composed 1942.
- London Symphony Orchestra conducted by Muir Mathieson. Film first shown: Leicester Square Theatre, London, 20 August 1942.

Walton was content to have the "Spitfire Prelude and Fugue" from the score published and performed in concert. He conducted the Liverpool Philharmonic Orchestra in the first concert performance in January 1943. Malcolm Sargent conducted the first London performance the following month. Walton conducted the Philharmonia Orchestra in an EMI recording made in the No. 1 Studio, Abbey Road in October 1963.

== Went the Day Well? ==
- Composed 1942.
- Studio Orchestra conducted by Ernest Irving. Film first shown: London Pavilion. 1 November 1942.

== Henry V ==
- Composed 1943–44.
- London Symphony Orchestra conducted by Muir Mathieson. Film first shown: London. Carlton, Haymarket 22 November 1944.

Walton allowed two self-contained sections of the score to be played in concert: the passacaglia "Death of Falstaff" and "Touch Her Soft Lips and Part", both for strings only. He conducted the Philharmonia in a recording of the two, issued by HMV in 1946. Sargent included those two movements in a four-movement suite for orchestra with chorus in 1946. Mathieson arranged a five-movement purely orchestral suite in 1963, which Walton conducted in the recording studio in the same year. In 1988 Palmer constructed what he called "Henry V: A Shakespeare Scenario" for orchestra and actor, from Walton's score and Shakespeare's words. It expands considerably on the Sargent and Matheson arrangements, and has a playing time of around an hour. The sections are:

1. Prologue
2. Interlude: At the Boar's Head
3. Embarkation
4. Interlude: "Touch Her Soft Lips and Part"
5. Harfleur
6. The Night Watch
7. "Upon the King"
8. Agincourt
9. Interlude: At the French Court
10. Epilogue

== Hamlet ==
- Composed 1947.
- Philharmonia conducted by Muir Mathieson. Film first shown: Odeon, Leicester Square, London, 6 May 1948.

The opening titles were adapted as the Funeral March by Mathieson in 1963. Four years later he arranged a "poem for orchestra", Hamlet and Ophelia, from the film score (Walton thought it "frightfully dull"). Some fanfares from the film were grouped into one piece, Fanfare for a Great Occasion, by Sargent in 1962. In 1990 Palmer extracted another "Shakespeare Scenario" for speaker and orchestra:

1. Prelude
2. Fanfare and Soliloquy
3. The Ghost
4. Hamlet and Ophelia
5. The Question – "To be or not to be"
6. The Mousetrap – The Players – Entry of the Court – The Play
7. Ophelia's Death
8. Retribution and Threnody
9. Finale (Funeral March)

== Richard III ==
- Composed 1955.
- Royal Philharmonic Orchestra conducted by Muir Mathieson. Film first shown: Leicester Square Theatre, London, 13 December 1955.
- Walton extracted and adapted his Three Pieces for Organ – March, Elegy and Scherzetto – from the film score in 1955.

In 1963 Mathieson arranged some of the score into a seven-movement suite:

1. Prelude
2. Fanfare
3. Music Plays
4. The Princes in the Tower
5. With Drums and Colours
6. I Would I Knew Thy Heart
7. Trumpets Sound.

In 1989 Palmer expanded the published suite into what he called "A Shakespeare Scenario", with an important spoken part delivering some of Shakespeare's lines.

1. Prelude
2. Coronation
3. Monologue: Now is the winter of our discontent
4. The Wooing
5. The Prince of Wales
6. Elegy
7. The Princes in the Tower
8. Nightmare
9. Bosworth Field
10. Death of Richard and Finale

== Battle of Britain ==
- Composed 1969.
- Studio orchestra conducted by Malcolm Arnold. Film first shown: London. Dominion Cinema. 15 September 1969.

Of Walton's original score only his "Battle in the Air" sequence was used in the film. The rest of the score remained unknown until 1988 when the musicologist and composer Colin Matthews arranged a two-movement concert suite, which Carl Davis conducted for EMI:

1. Spitfire Music and Battle in the Air
2. March Introduction and Siegfried Music

== Three Sisters ==
- Composed 1969.
- Studio orchestra conducted by Marc Wilkinson. Film first shown: Sala Volpi, Venice, 26 August 1970; London: Cameo-Poly, 2 November 1970.

Palmer extracted a three-movement suite from the score in 1989:

1. Opening titles
2. Dream sequence
3. End titles

== A Wartime Sketchbook ==
In addition to suites drawn from single Walton film scores, Palmer drew on several scores for his A Wartime Sketchbook (1990), which has these eight movements:

1. Prologue, from music for Went the Day Well? and The Next of Kin
2. Bicycle-chase, from The Next of Kin and The Foreman went to France
3. Refugees, from The Foreman went to France
4. Scherzo – "Gay Berlin", from Battle of Britain
5. Foxtrots, from The Next of Kin
6. Lovers, from The Next of Kin
7. Striptease, from The Next of Kin
8. Epilogue, from The Foreman Went to France

== Recordings ==
Walton made several studio recordings of his film music between 1943 and 1963, issued on EMI's HMV or Columbia labels:

Work	Orchestra/speaker	Recorded	Ref
The First of the Few: "Spitfire Prelude and Fugue"	Hallé	24 June 1943	
Henry V: Two Pieces for Strings	Philharmonia	12 October 1945	
Henry V: 15 scenes from the film	Laurence Olivier and the Philharmonia	27–28 August and 12–13 October 1946	(Note: An extra session on 13 November 1946 was conducted by Roy Douglas.)
Henry V: Suite, arr. Mathieson	Philharmonia	15 October 1963	
Hamlet: Funeral March	Philharmonia	15 October 1963	
Richard III: Suite, arr. Mathieson	Philharmonia	15–16 October 1963	

Chandos Records has issued four CDs of music derived from Walton's film scores in its "Walton: The Complete Works" set. All are played by the Academy of St Martin in the Fields, directed by Sir Neville Marriner:

- As You Like It: Suite, arr. Palmer with Catherine Bott soprano
- Battle of Britain: Suite, arr. Matthews
- Escape Me Never: "Poem for Orchestra", arr. Palmer
- Hamlet: "Shakespeare Scenario", arr. Palmer, with Sir John Gielgud, speaker
- Henry V: "Shakespeare Scenario", with Christopher Plummer, speaker, Westminster Cathedral Choir and Academy of St Martin in the Fields Chorus,
- Major Barbara: "Shavian Sequence", arr. Palmer
- Richard III: "Shakespeare Scenario", arr. Palmer, with Gielgud, speaker.
- Spitfire Prelude and Fugue
- Three Sisters: Suite, arr. Palmer
- A Wartime Sketchbook, arr. Palmer

Naxos Records has issued a recording of the Hamlet scenario, with Michael Sheen, speaker, and the RTÉ Concert Orchestra, conducted by Andrew Penny.

There have been several recordings of the "Spitfire Prelude and Fugue", including:

- BBC Scottish Symphony Orchestra, conducted by Martyn Brabbins
- English Chamber Orchestra, conducted by Steuart Bedford
- English Northern Philharmonia, conducted by Paul Daniel
- Florida Philharmonic Orchestra, conducted by James Judd
- New Haven Symphony Orchestra, conducted by William Boughton
- Royal Liverpool Philharmonic Orchestra, conducted by Sir Charles Groves

Source: WorldCat.

== Notes, references and sources ==
=== Sources ===
- Lloyd, Stephen (1999). "Film Music". In Stewart R. Craggs (ed.). William Walton: Music and Literature. Aldershot: Ashgate. ISBN 1-85928-190-7.
- Kennedy, Michael (1989). Portrait of Walton. Oxford: Oxford University Press. ISBN 0-19-816705-9.
- Palmer, Christopher (May 1990). "The Uncollected Walton". The Musical Times. 131 (1767): 247–252. doi:10.2307/966157.
