= Varii Capricci =

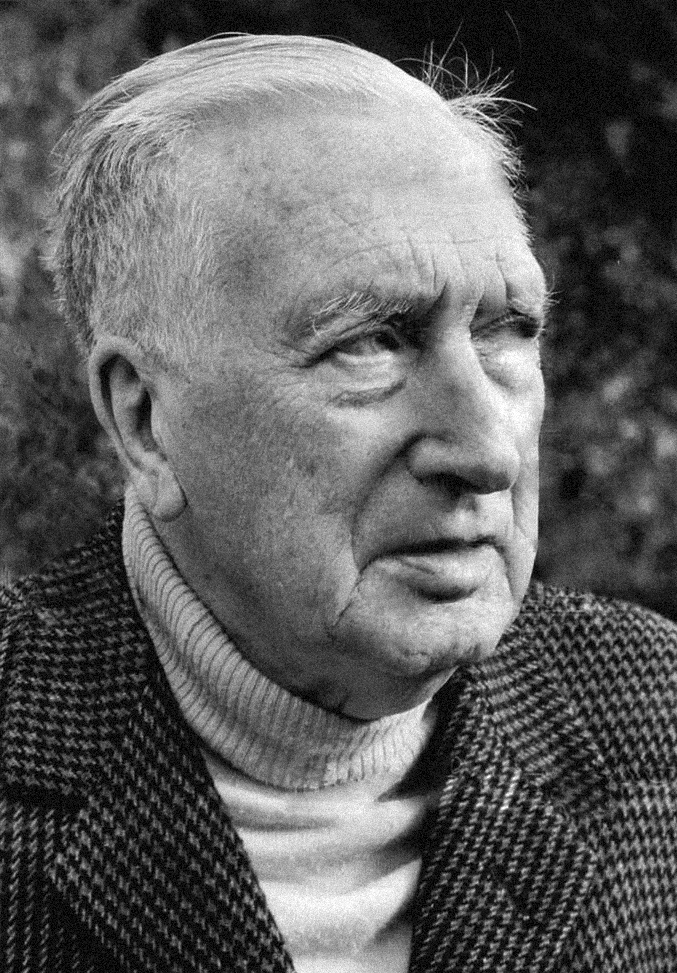
William Walton in 1976

Varii Capricci (Note: The title translates literally into English as "various whims" but "capricci" in a musical context refers, inter alia, to short pieces of a light-hearted or even humorous nature.) is an orchestral work by William Walton. Completed in 1976, it is the composer's transcription for symphony orchestra of his Five Bagatelles for solo guitar written four years earlier. Walton revised the orchestral score in 1982. It is his last substantial orchestral work. The final version was used by the choreographer Frederick Ashton in a 1983 ballet in Walton's memory.

== Five Bagatelles ==
In 1960 Walton had composed a song cycle, Anon in Love, for tenor and guitar. The original guitarist, Julian Bream, approached Walton again in 1971, this time for solo guitar music. As he had with the song cycle, Bream helped Walton with technical details of guitar playing, and he edited the final version for performance. The Five Bagatelles play for around fourteen minutes in total. The timings are taken from Bream's 1973 recording. The five movements are:

1. Allegro [3:35]
2. Lento [3:16]
3. Alla Cubana [2:03]
4. Sempre espressivo [2:14]
5. Con slancio [2:25] (Note: "With enthusiasm, or dash")

Bream gave the first performance of the complete work in the Assembly Rooms, Bath on 27 May 1972 in a concert marking the composer's seventieth birthday.

== Varii Capricci ==
To celebrate the 25th anniversary of the Royal Festival Hall in 1976, the Greater London Council asked Walton for a new work. He decided on an orchestral version – he called it "a free transcription" – of the Bagatelles. The original guitar version was dedicated to his friend and fellow composer Malcolm Arnold, to whom Walton wrote in April 1976

I’ve been much occupied and pre-occupied by scoring those 5 Bagatelles for a large orchestra ... I fear I’ve not done them very well, in fact I should have asked you to do them, but having let myself in for something for the F.H. I thought these would be easy. I couldn’t have been more mistaken. I found them full of pitfalls especially the last one which is musically very much changed and hurriedly scored and full of wrong notes!

Walton redefined the movements for the orchestral version. The five movements are:

1. Allegro assai
2. Lento sognando (Note: "Dreamily")
3. Alla Cubana
4. Lento
5. Presto con slancio

The London Symphony Orchestra, conducted by André Previn, gave the first performance of the work at the Festival Hall on 4 May 1976. In The Times. Alan Blyth called Walton "a composer who, in his eighth decade, still delights in youthful exuberance tinged with gentle lyricism"; The Musical Times commented, "the skill with which Walton has transformed his guitar pieces into brilliant movements for orchestra will be appreciated by connoisseurs of scoring. Not a profound or important work, but endearing and entertaining". The musicologist Christopher Palmer has called Walton's score "a wholly typical product of his mellow and fruitful Indian summer – typical in its subtle Mediterranean and Latin American inflexions, its delicacy of instrumentation (colour being a sybaritic end-in-itself much more in the later than in the earlier Walton) and its relaxed objective melodiousness". Walton revised the last movement and the work was given in its altered form in January 1981.

== Varii Capricci ballet ==
The choreographer Sir Frederick Ashton, a friend of the composer since the 1920s, proposed to use the Varii Capricci for a new ballet ostensibly set in the garden of La Mortella, Walton's house on Ischia, and asked him to make some adjustments to the finale. Walton did so and sent the new version to Ashton on 6 March 1983. Two days later Walton died and Ashton's ballet became a commemoration, dedicated by Ashton "to my lifelong friend". It was premiered by the Royal Ballet, visiting the Metropolitan Opera House, New York, on 19 April 1983. The two leading roles, La Capricciosa and Lo Straniero, were danced by Antoinette Sibley and Anthony Dowell.

Reviewing the New York production, Oleg Kerensky wrote, "Everybody expected Varii Capricci, Sir Frederick Ashton's new ballet ... to be a hit. Nobody expected it to be a total surprise. But that's what it is – a different Ashton, recalling the jazzy and witty styles of his Façade and Jazz Calendar but with more than a hint of the decadent atmosphere of Nijinska's Les biches". The set was by David Hockney, with a green and orange backdrop and a swimming pool, representing Walton's garden in Ischia. The piece depicts a mild flirtation between the langorous Capricciosa and the gigolo-like Straniero. (Note: Respectively, "Capricious woman" and "Stranger") Kerensky judged the ballet "no mere divertissement. It's a miniature masterpiece".

== Notes, references and sources ==
=== Sources ===
- Kennedy, Michael (1989). Portrait of Walton. Oxford: Oxford University Press. ISBN 978-0-19-816705-1.
