= Scapino (Walton) =

Scapin, or Scapino, by Jacques Callot, Walton's inspiration for the overture

Scapino is a short work for large orchestra by William Walton, described by the composer as a "comedy overture". It was commissioned by the Chicago Symphony Orchestra and was first performed in 1941. A revised version was premiered in 1950.

== Background and first performances ==
In July 1938 William Walton, by this time established as a leading composer, received a visit from Frederick Stock, conductor of the Chicago Symphony Orchestra, who was commissioning works for the 1940–41 season to celebrate the orchestra's fiftieth anniversary. (Note: Other composers commissioned to write works for the anniversary included Igor Stravinsky, Zoltán Kodály, Darius Milhaud and Roy Harris.) Walton accepted the commission, and originally planned an extensive suite of five pieces to be called Varii Capricci. (Note: Michael Kennedy notes that Walton used the title forty years later when he orchestrated his Bagatelles for guitar.) He had in mind a series of commedia dell'arte sketches.

Among Walton's earlier works was Portsmouth Point, a lively overture inspired by an 1814 etching by Thomas Rowlandson, and the composer abandoned the idea of a suite in favour of another such overture. He again drew inspiration from an old print, in this case the character Scapin in Jacques Callot's Les Trois Pantalons, dating from 1619. Scapin – Scapino in the original Italian – was the rascally servant in the commedia dell'arte, who helped plan the escapades of his master, Harlequin, and in particular his amorous adventures; he was not without such escapades of his own. In the 1950 edition of the published score, Walton included this note:

Scapino is one of the less familiar characters of the Commedia dell'Arte, the hero of Molière's Fourberies de Scapin, who may figure in the complicated ancestry of Figaro. We owe him the word "escapade", which is descriptive of the character's stock-in-trade. Callot's etching portrays him in his traditional costume.

The first performance was given in Chicago on 3 April 1941 with a repeat performance a fortnight later. Because of evacuation from London during the Second World War, the British premiere was given in the town of Bedford 60 miles (97 kilometres) north of London, where the BBC Symphony Orchestra was temporarily based. The composer conducted. The London premiere, also under Walton, was given by the London Philharmonic Orchestra at the Royal Albert Hall on 13 December 1941.

The original score was written for an unusually large orchestra, and Walton revised the work to make it suitable for conventional orchestra forces. Wilhelm Furtwängler conducted the Philharmonia Orchestra in the first performance of the revision in November 1950 at the Albert Hall.

== Music ==
In its revised 1950 form, the work is scored for three flutes (one doubling piccolo), two oboes, one cor anglais, two clarinets, one bass clarinet, two bassoons, four horns, three trumpets, three trombones, one tuba and one harp, with a percussion section comprising timpani, cymbals, triangle, castanets, Chinese temple blocks, glockenspiel, xylophone, side drum, bass drum, tam-tam and strings.

The overture typically takes between eight and nine minutes in performance. After the first London performance, The Times described it thus:

It is comedy music in the composer's best manner; a vivid rhythm which never declines and falls (though it sometimes drops into poetry), and is set off by every scintillating effect of orchestration (including percussion) that skill can provide. When he drops into poetry, it is apt to be the poetry of Elgar's Falstaff, which means that Walton's Scapino is an English version of the Italian rogue of the Commedia dell' Arte. The overture is more the Walton of Façade than of the symphony and the concertos.

The character Scapino is presented in two contrasting themes at the opening of the work, the first molto vivace on the trumpet; it is, in Michael Kennedy's words, "preceded by a flurry of strings and woodwind and a crash of percussion. Typical Walton, no one else". The second theme is also lively, but is less assertive. After the two themes have been presented and developed, Walton introduces a slower and more flowing melody for violas and cor anglais, "come una serenata" (like a serenade), depicting Scapino's romantic side. The two livelier themes return and the work ends boisterously.

== Recordings ==
Recordings of Scapino include:

Orchestra	Conductor	Ref
Chicago Symphony	Frederick Stock	OCLC 12865926
Philharmonia	Composer	OCLC 754443469
London Philharmonic	Sir Adrian Boult	OCLC 858501582
Royal Liverpool Philharmonic	Sir Charles Groves	OCLC 17586549
London Symphony	Composer	OCLC 30528045
London Philharmonic	Bryden Thomson	OCLC 611490172
London Symphony	André Previn	OCLC 754443469
Bournemouth Symphony	Andrew Litton	OCLC 966319541
Orquesta Filarmónica de Gran Canaria	Adrian Leaper	OCLC 76760048
Royal Liverpool Philharmonic	John Wilson	OCLC 885041945

An arrangement for military band has been recorded by The President's Own United States Marine Band. (OCLC 884886458).

== Notes, references and sources ==
=== Sources ===
- Howes, Frank (1973). The Music of William Walton (second ed.). London: Oxford University Press. ISBN 978-0-19-315431-5.
- Kennedy, Michael (1989). Portrait of Walton. Oxford: Oxford University Press. ISBN 978-0-19-816705-1.
- Tierney, Neil (1984). William Walton: His Life and Music. London: Robert Hale. ISBN 978-0-70-901784-4.
