= Anon in Love =

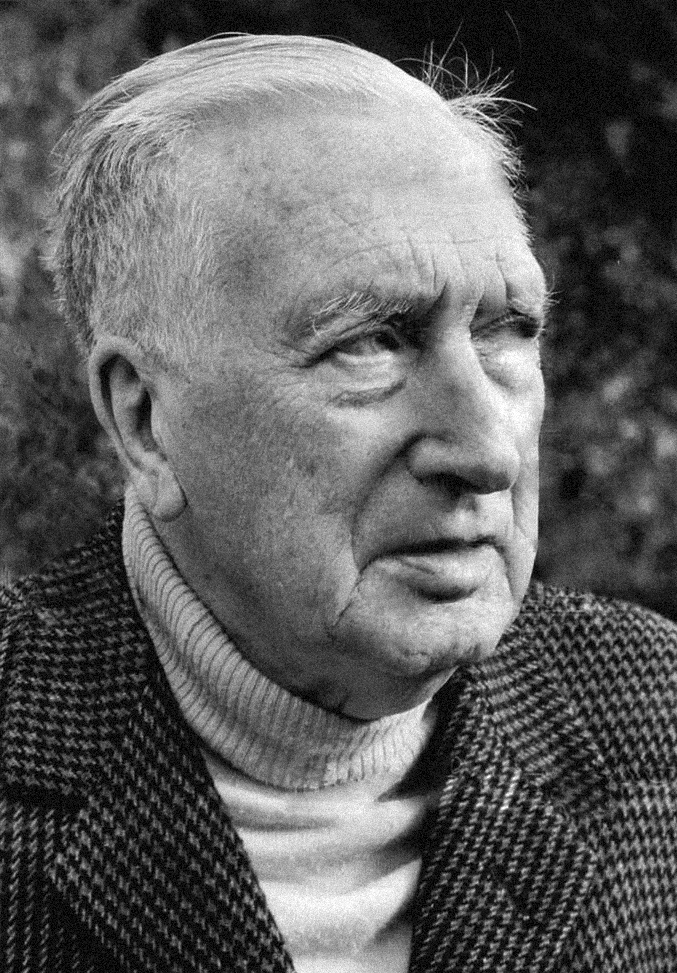
William Walton in 1976

Anon in Love is a cycle of six songs by William Walton, originally for tenor and guitar, setting anonymous poems from the sixteenth and seventeenth centuries. The cycle was commissioned by the tenor Peter Pears and the guitarist Julian Bream and first performed at the Aldeburgh Festival in 1960. Walton later arranged the cycle for tenor and small orchestra. A version for voice and piano was made by the musicologist Christopher Palmer and premiered after the composer's death. All three versions have been commercially recorded.

== Background ==
For most of his career Walton had been chiefly associated with orchestral and choral music. His juvenilia included four songs setting words by Swinburne (1918) and he adapted three spoken numbers from Façade as songs for voice and piano (1932); his music for the 1936 film of As You Like It included a setting of Amiens' song "Under the Greenwood Tree", and for a 1942 BBC radio play Christopher Columbus he set a lyric by Louis MacNeice, but these were until 1960 his only solo songs from a professional career of four decades.

In 1959 the tenor Peter Pears and the guitarist Julian Bream, who were giving joint recitals at that time, approached Walton to write a new set of songs for them. Pears was known among other things for his performances of the English lute song repertory of the sixteenth and seventeenth centuries and for his appearances in the operas of his life partner Benjamin Britten. He suggested to Walton that the new work could have the character of "a one-man opera". The idea appealed to Walton, who turned to Christopher Hassall, his librettist for his one full-length opera Troilus and Cressida, to provide the lyrics for him to set.

Hassall selected six poems from Gerald Bullett's anthology The English Galaxy of Shorter Poems. All were from the sixteenth or seventeenth centuries and all were by unknown writers. Reflecting that, Walton gave the cycle the title Anon in Love. The first three songs have lyrics from the Elizabethan age and are more chaste in tone than the last three, which are later and bawdier.

== Premiere, arrangements and content ==
Pears and Bream gave the first performance of the cycle on 21 June 1960 at Shrubland Hall, Suffolk as part of the that year's Aldeburgh Festival. The work was an immediate success; the final song had to be encored, and the reviews were excellent. The music critic of The Times wrote that although some of Walton's recent works had received a mixed press, "these settings of sixteenth and seventeenth century love Poems must surely he universally welcomed. Fired by the artistry and virtuosity of these two musicians. Walton has distilled the fruits of his experience into a potent and concentrated musical utterance, sometimes direct and sometimes curiously subtle". The reviewer in The Daily Telegraph said that the cycle revealed a compactness of invention that the composer had not invoked since Façade, and added "it is an unexpected delight to find Walton so successful in this field". The Scotsman found the songs "absolutely delightful, with a sprightliness and wit reminiscent of the composer's early works".

In 1971 Walton arranged the cycle for tenor and chamber orchestra, consisting of strings, harp and percussion (tabor, tambourine, block and side drum). This version was first performed at the Mansion House, London in May 1971, by the tenor Robert Tear and the London Mozart Players, conducted by Harry Blech.

After Walton's death Christopher Palmer arranged the cycle for voice and piano. This version was premiered in May 1989 at the Wigmore Hall, London, by the tenor Martyn Hill and the pianist Graham Johnson.

All three versions of the cycle have been commercially recorded.

The six songs of the cycle are:

- Fain Would I Change
- O Stay, Sweet Love
- Lady, When I Behold
- My Love in Her Attire
- I Gave Her Cakes
- To Couple is a Custom.

Source: William Walton: A Catalogue.

The cycle takes about nine minutes in performance.

== Sources ==
- Craggs, Stewart R. (1990). William Walton: A Catalogue. Oxford: Oxford University Press. ISBN 0-19-315474-9.
- Cuckston, Alan (1999). "The Songs". In Stewart R. Craggs (ed.). William Walton: Music and Literature. Aldershot: Ashgate. ISBN 1-85928-190-7.
