= Piano Quartet (Walton) =

The Piano Quartet in D minor by English composer William Walton was completed in 1919 when he was only 16 years old. Scored for piano, violin, viola, and cello, Walton later revised the work in 1921, 1955, and 1974-1975. It was first performed in Liverpool on September 19, 1924.

== Structure ==
The work is in four movements:

1. Allegramente
2. Allegro scherzando
3. Andante tranquillo
4. Allegro molto

A typical performance of the quartet takes around 30 minutes.

== Notable recordings ==
- Peter Donohoe, piano with members of the Maggini Quartet
