= Alan Frank =

English musician (1910–1994)

Alan Clifford Frank (10 October 1910 – 23 June 1994), was a music publisher, clarinetist and composer, who headed the Oxford University Press Music Department between 1954 and 1975. He was married to the composer Phyllis Tate.

Frank grew up in the Brixton area of London. His mother Fanny played the violin and had been taught by Joseph Joachim. Gaining a scholarship to Dulwich College he studied clarinet with Frederick Thurston. In 1927, aged 17, he began working at the music department of Oxford University Press under Hubert Foss. There he met Phyllis Tate. They were married in 1935. They had two children: a son Colin, born in 1940 and a daughter Celia, in 1952.

During the war Frank served as an intelligence officer for the RAF and was posted to Ceylon. After the war he returned to OUP as music editor (1947), becoming head of the Music Department in 1954 (succeeding Norman Peterkin) and remained there until his retirement in 1975. At the OUP offices (at 44 Conduit Street) Frank worked with composers including Ralph Vaughan Williams, William Walton, Alan Rawsthorne and Alun Hoddinott.

Frank kept up his interest in the clarinet. The Suite for Two Clarinets (1934) is his only composition to have maintained its place in the teaching repertoire. Later in life, in collaboration with his teacher Jack Thurston he wrote The Clarinet: A Comprehensive Method (1966), a book that is also still in use today by students. Frank also collaborated with Thurston's widow, the composer and clarinetist Thea King on arrangements of Schumann and Mendelssohn for clarinet and piano, used as examination material for the Associated Board of Music.

His other publications included The Playing of Chamber Music with violinist and leader of the London Symphony Orchestra George Stratton (1935, 2nd. ed. 1951), and Modern British Composers (1953). He was the editor of the volumes This Year's Work in Music (Longmans, British Council), for 1947-8, 1948-49 and 1950-51.
