= Spitfire Prelude and Fugue =

1942 orchestral composition by William Walton

Spitfire Prelude and Fugue is an orchestral composition by William Walton, arranged and extracted in 1942 from music he had written for the motion picture The First of the Few earlier that year.

== The music ==
There were four films released in 1942 with music by William Walton. These helped establish him as a major figure in English music and British film music. The popularity of the music in The First of the Few was such that a recording was made in the same year of the Spitfire Prelude and Fugue with the composer conducting. Sid Cole, supervising editor of The First of the Few, noted that "when the film was finally edited, William Walton was doing the music. Leslie Howard, for some reason, could not be at the running of the film for Walton so he told me very elaborately what he wanted from the music. So after we had the viewing I went up to Walton and repeated what Leslie had said as accurately as I could. Walton listened very carefully and said Oh I see, Leslie wants a lot of notes, and he went away and wrote The Spitfire Fugue".

A review of The First of the Few in the New Statesman and Nation on 29 August 1942 mentioned the score: "Walton's music deserves special recommendation. His fugal movement for the assembly of parts of the Spitfire adds immensely to the most moving sequence in the film".

The prelude, called by Stephen Lloyd "one of Walton’s finest marches", is the music heard over the opening credit titles in the movie. The fugue is used to describe the making of the Spitfire; a central lyrical violin solo depicts the exhaustion and dying by illness of the aircraft’s designer R. J. Mitchell, and then the patriotic march returns joined with the fugue to mark the completion of the fighter aircraft.

In 1947, John Huntley wrote of the composition, "The Prelude is a patriotic, resounding piece of good orchestration; simple in construction, it makes ideal film music".

== Instrumentation and duration ==
Two flutes (second doubling piccolo), one or two oboes, two clarinets, one or two bassoons, four horns, two trumpets, three trombones, tuba, timpani, percussion (side drum, cymbals, bell), harp, and strings. A note in the score reads: "Optional 2nd oboe and 2nd bassoon parts have been added by Vilém Tauský, with the composer's authorization."

The work takes about eight minutes to perform.

== Score ==
The autograph full score, 32 pages long, can be found at the Beinecke Rare Book and Manuscript Library, Yale University. Oxford University Press published a study score in 1961.

== Arrangements ==
There are several arrangements including organ solo (1966, a shortened version of the piece arranged by Dennis Morrell); military band (1966 Prelude only by Rodney B. Bashford; 1970 Fugue only by J.L. Wallace); brass ensemble (1977, Elgar Howarth); and brass band (Eric Crees). There is also an arrangement of the entire composition for military band by H. B. Hingley and used for the recording "Heroes of the Air" with Hingley conducting the Central Band of the Royal Air Force in 1992.

== First performance ==
The Spitfire Prelude and Fugue was first performed at Philharmonic Hall in Liverpool on 2 January 1943 with the Liverpool Philharmonic Orchestra conducted by the composer. This was part of an all-Walton concert sponsored by the British Council.

== Recordings ==
The composer recorded the work twice. He conducted it for records on 24 June 1943 with the Hallé Orchestra and on 16 October 1963 with the Philharmonia Orchestra. There are several other orchestral recordings and recordings of all the band arrangements mentioned above.

The score for the film was recorded by Muir Mathieson conducting an uncredited London Symphony Orchestra in June(?) 1942 at the Denham Film Studios.

The earliest extant non-British recording of the Spitfire Prelude and Fugue comes from the Carnegie Hall concert of 6 February 1949 in which Leopold Stokowski conducted the New York Philharmonic. It has been released on a Pristine Audio CD.

== Legacy ==
Walton was also commissioned in June 1968 for the score of a movie on a similar subject, Battle of Britain.

== Bibliography ==
- Hunt, Martin. “Their Finest Hour? The Scoring of “Battle of Britain”. Film History, 2002, pp. 47–56.
- Huntley, John. British Film Music. London: Skelton Robinson, 1947, p. 59.
- Irving, Ernest. “Music in Films”. Music & Letters, October 1943, p. 229.
- Lloyd, Stephen. William Walton: Muse of Fire. The Boydell Press, 2001.
- Mackay, Robert. Half the Battle: Civilian Morale in Britain During the Second World War. Manchester University Press, 2002, p. 167.
- Palmer, Christopher. "The First of the Few" album notes for Chandos 8870, 1990.
- Palmer, Christopher. “Walton’s Film Music”. The Musical times, March 1972, p. 249.
- Tierney, Neil. William Walton: His Life and Music. London: Robert Hale, 1984.
