= William Boughton =

English conductor

William Boughton (born 18 December 1948) is an English conductor.

== Overview ==
He was born in Birmingham, England.

Boughton has guest conducted with many of the world's leading orchestras from San Francisco to Helsinki. As founder, artistic and music director with the English Symphony Orchestra (ESO), Boughton developed the orchestra's repertoire through the Viennese classics to contemporary music. Together, he and the ESO built a discography of recordings with Nimbus Records, a number of which have reached the top ten in the US charts. He has also recorded with the Philharmonia, Royal Philharmonic and London Symphony Orchestras.

Boughton previously served as the music director for the New Haven Symphony Orchestra. Since 2019, he has been music director of the Yale Symphony Orchestra.
