= Symphony No. 1 (Walton) =

1930s symphony composed by William Walton

The Symphony No. 1 in B♭ minor is one of two symphonies by the English composer William Walton. The composer had difficulty in completing the work, and its first public performance was given without the finale, in 1934. The complete four-movement work was premiered the following year.

The work shows the influence of Sibelius, particularly in its musical structure. It is among the best-known symphonies by British composers, and has received numerous recordings from within a month of the 1935 premiere to the 21st century.

== Background ==
In 1923 Walton had established a reputation as an avant garde composer with his "Entertainment", Façade (to verses by Edith Sitwell). His other major works of the 1920s and early 1930s, including the overture Portsmouth Point (1926), the Viola Concerto and the cantata, Belshazzar's Feast had established him as a prominent figure in British music.

In 1932 Walton began work on a symphony. Always a slow and painstaking composer, he made gradual progress. The first two movements were finished by early 1933, and he composed the slow movement in the middle of that year. After that, he suffered a persistent writer's block and could not complete the finale. Critics including Edward Greenfield have suggested that the problem was a reaction to the break-up of Walton's six-year love affair with a young German widow, the Baroness Imma von Doernberg, to whom the symphony is dedicated. Walton was not writing to commission, and there was no contractual deadline for the completion of the symphony, but he had promised the premiere to the conductor Sir Hamilton Harty and the London Symphony Orchestra (LSO). The composer had allowed the work to be announced for two consecutive years in the orchestra's seasonal prospectus, and the expectation thus aroused put pressure on him. In 1934 he was persuaded by Harty and others to allow a performance of the three completed movements. This took place at the Queen's Hall on 3 December 1934. Two more performances of the incomplete work were given the following April by the London Philharmonic Orchestra conducted by Malcolm Sargent.

Walton took a break from work on the symphony during 1934 to compose his first film music (for Paul Czinner's Escape Me Never). After a gap of eight months he resumed work on the symphony and completed it in August 1935. Harty and the BBC Symphony Orchestra gave the premiere of the completed piece on 6 November of that year. The performance roused great enthusiasm. The News Chronicle reported, "The applause at the close was overwhelming, and when Mr Walton, a slim, shy, young man, came on to the platform he was cheered continuously for five minutes".

The symphony aroused international interest. The leading continental conductors Wilhelm Furtwängler and Willem Mengelberg sent for copies of the score; the Chicago Symphony Orchestra premiered the work in the US under Harty; Eugene Ormandy and the Philadelphia Orchestra gave the New York premiere; and the young George Szell conducted the symphony in Australia. (Note: Furtwängler programmed the work but did not conduct it himself, assigning it to a guest conductor, Leo Borchard.)

== Structure ==
The symphony is scored for an orchestra comprising 2 flutes (one doubling piccolo), 2 oboes, 2 clarinets in B♭ (doubling clarinets in A), 2 bassoons, 4 horns in F, 3 trumpets in C, 3 trombones, tuba, percussion (timpani (two players), snare drum, cymbals, and tam-tam), and strings. The percussion section (other than timpani) is brought into use only towards the end of the last movement.

The work is in four movements:

1. Allegro assai – Poco meno mosso – A tempo, agitato – Poco meno mosso – Agitato poco a poco – Animato
2. Scherzo: Presto con malizia
3. Andante con malinconia
4. Maestoso – Allegro, brioso ed ardentemente – Vivacissimo – Agitato – Maestoso

=== I. Allegro assai – Poco meno mosso – A tempo, agitato – Poco meno mosso – Agitato poco a poco – Animato ===
The first movement opens with a pianissimo timpani roll on B♭; the horns enter, also extremely quietly, one at a time, on B♭, F and G. A quiet oboe theme begins in D♭; a five-note cello motif recurs throughout the movement. According to the critic Anthony Burton, the effect of the movement is broad and powerful: the breadth coming from "slow-moving harmonies over Sibelius-like long-held bass notes and timpani rolls" and the power from "urgently repeated ostinato figures, blazing dissonances, and sonorous scoring". The tension of the first section of the movement relaxes slightly for the second subject, which is a little slower, building to a climax of fiercely repeated notes.

The central development section reprises the opening idea very quietly, slowly increasing the intensity. The movement ends with the return of the first theme, this time with more orthodox harmonisation. At one stage during the composition of the work, Walton had thought of leaving the Allegro assai as a single-movement symphony. The commentator Keith Anderson observes that the movement has "a compelling unity" that has prompted comparisons with Sibelius, although Walton disagreed with such a view.

=== II. Scherzo: Presto con malizia ===
The scherzo – "with malice" – in E minor, is in a fast 3/4 time, with occasional bars of rhythmically disruptive 5/4; over insistent rhythms, with percussive outbursts, angular off-beat fragmentary themes continue throughout, with no relaxed trio section to break the tension.

=== III. Andante con malinconia ===
Walton originally marked the slow movement "Adagio con melancolia", now amended in printed editions of the score to "Andante con malinconia" ("at a moderate pace, with melancholy"). The movement, in C ♯ minor, opens with a melancholy flute melody and later employs a second slow theme; both themes are, in Burton's phrase, "characteristically bitter-sweet lyricism". Walton develops them contrapuntally to a passionate climactic outburst, after which the music subsides and moves to a hushed conclusion.

In Walton's earlier drafts, the theme of the andante was intended for the opening movement, but he found "it didn't work out, then it became the slow movement". His original plan for the movement included a central scherzando episode, but he removed it from the short score, and nothing of it survives.

=== IV. Maestoso – Allegro, brioso ed ardentemente – Vivacissimo – Agitato – Maestoso ===
The finale brings the work back to the key of B♭ but now in the major. For this movement, Walton specifies a second timpanist and two other percussionists. The opening is a flourish in a grand manner that the composer later adopted in his coronation marches and film music. This is followed by two discrete sections directed to be played "quickly, with animation and ardour"; the first is sharply energetic, and the second a lively fugue, with a more relaxed central section. The themes of the two sections are developed in a brisk passage in triple time. The tempo slows down for the return of the opening theme of the movement, forming what Burton describes as "a grandiloquent coda."

== Critical reception ==
From the outset, critics remarked on Walton's debt to Sibelius in the symphony. Neville Cardus was among them, but he added that nobody except Sibelius had written a greater orchestral work than Walton's symphony since the heyday of Elgar. Byron Adams says of the work that its "orgiastic power, coruscating malice, sensuous desolation and extroverted swagger" make the symphony a tribute to Walton's tenacity and inventive facility. The critic Edwin Evans wrote of the Andante con malinconia:

The slow movement is in my opinion the nodal section of the work. Its structure is melodic, its character idyllic and contemplative, but in an intimately personal way, with a feeling of melancholy and of craving expectancy which is wholly removed from the "yearning" of the Romantics. It is in some ways the most significant piece of music Walton has written.

Critics have always differed on whether the grandly optimistic finale matches the rest of the work. As to the work as a whole, in a 1998 study of the international symphonic repertoire, Michael Steinberg acknowledged the Sibelian influence, but added:

For all that, Walton's Symphony No 1 is a free, strong, individual utterance, as far beyond mere imitation as, say, the Brahms First is in its relationship to Beethoven. Not many would wish to call Walton one of the great twentieth-century composers, but the claim that his First Symphony is one of the great twentieth-century symphonies is not excessive.

Tom Service called the work "a volcanic eruption of dark, sensual passion which speaks with unmediated power from the very first bar."

== Recordings ==
Walton's First Symphony has been well represented on record. The first recording was made by the fledgling Decca company at its Thames Street recording studio in London, with Harty and the LSO supervised by the composer on 9–10 December 1935, a month after the premiere of the complete work. Later recordings include:

Orchestra	Conductor	Label	Date
Philharmonia	Sir William Walton	EMI	1951
Orchestra Sinfonica di Roma della RAI	Herbert von Karajan	EMI	1953
London Philharmonic	Sir Adrian Boult	Pye	1956
New Zealand Symphony	Sir William Walton	Bridge	1964
Royal Philharmonic	Sir William Walton	BBC	1965
London Symphony	André Previn	RCA	1967
New Philharmonia	Sir Malcolm Sargent	EMI	1967
Royal Philharmonic	Jascha Horenstein	Suisa	1971
BBC Symphony	Sir Adrian Boult	BBC	1975
Royal Liverpool Philharmonic	Vernon Handley	WEA Enigma	1978
Philharmonia	Bernard Haitink	EMI	1982
Scottish National	Sir Alexander Gibson	Chandos	1984
Royal Philharmonic	André Previn	Telarc	1987
London Philharmonic	Leonard Slatkin	Virgin	1988
Bournemouth Symphony	Vernon Handley	EMI	1989
London Philharmonic	Sir Charles Mackerras	EMI	1989
Philharmonia	Louis Frémaux	Collins	1989
London Philharmonic	Bryden Thomson	Chandos	1991
City of Birmingham Symphony	Simon Rattle	EMI	1992
BBC National Orchestra of Wales	Tadaaki Otaka	BBC	1993
Royal Philharmonic	Vladimir Ashkenazy	Decca	1993
BBC Scottish Symphony	Martyn Brabbins	Hyperion	1995
Bournemouth Symphony	Andrew Litton	Decca	1995
Gran Canaria Philharmonic Orchestra	Adrian Leaper	Sony Classical	1996
English Northern Philharmonia	Paul Daniel	Naxos	2004
London Symphony	Sir Colin Davis	LSO Live	2005
New Haven Symphony Orchestra	William Boughton	Nimbus	2010
Lille National Orchestra	Owain Arwel Hughes	BIS	2010
BBC Symphony	Edward Gardner	Chandos	2014
Bournemouth Symphony	Kirill Karabits	Onyx	2017
City of Birmingham Symphony	Kazuki Yamada	Deutsche Grammophon	2026

Source: Walton Trust and WorldCat.

== Notes and references ==
=== Sources ===
- Cox, David (1967). "William Walton". In Simpson, Robert (ed.). The Symphony: Elgar to the Present Day. London: Pelican. OCLC 221594461.
- Evans, Edwin (December 1944). "Modern British Composers (New Series): I. William Walton (Concluded)". The Musical Times. 85 (1222): 364–368 and 371. doi:10.2307/922336. JSTOR 922336. (subscription required)
- Kennedy, Michael (1989). Portrait of Walton. Oxford: Oxford University Press. ISBN 978-0-19-816705-1.
- Ottaway, Hugh (March 1972). "Walton's First Symphony: The Composition of the Finale". The Musical Times. 113 (1549): 254–257. doi:10.2307/957129. JSTOR 957129. (subscription required)
- Ottaway, Hugh (October 1973). "Walton's First and Its Composition". The Musical Times. 114 (1568): 998–999 and 1001. doi:10.2307/955367. JSTOR 955367. (subscription required)
- Steinberg, Michael (1998) [1995]. The Symphony: A Listener's Guide. Oxford: Oxford University Press. ISBN 978-0-19-506177-2.
