= As You Like It (1936 film) =

1936 British film by Paul Czinner

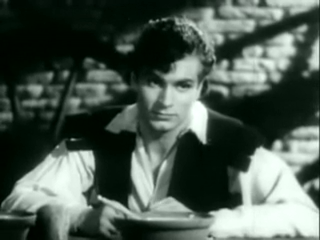
- Directed by: Paul Czinner; Joseph M. Schenck (uncredited)
- Written by: J. M. Barrie (treatment); R. J. Cullen (scenario)
- Based on: As You Like It (play) by William Shakespeare
- Produced by: Paul Czinner
- Starring: Laurence Olivier; Elisabeth Bergner; Felix Aylmer; Henry Ainley; Sophie Stewart
- Cinematography: Harold Rosson
- Edited by: David Lean
- Music by: William Walton
- Distributed by: 20th Century Fox
- Release date: 3 September 1936 (United Kingdom)
- Running time: 96 minutes
- Country: United Kingdom
- Language: English
- Budget: £180,000

As You Like It is a 1936 British romantic comedy film directed by Paul Czinner and starring Laurence Olivier as Orlando and Elisabeth Bergner as Rosalind. It is based on William Shakespeare's play of the same name. It was Olivier's first performance of Shakespeare on screen.

It was the final film of stage actors Leon Quartermaine and Henry Ainley, and featured an early screen role for Ainley's son Richard as Sylvius, as well as for John Laurie, who played Orlando's brother Oliver. (Laurie would go on to perform with Olivier in the three Shakespearean films that Olivier directed.)

Bergner had previously played the role of Rosalind in her native Germany and her German accent is apparent in most of her scenes.

== Synopsis ==
Duke Frederick has usurped and deposed his older brother, Duke Senior. Frederick allows the exiled Duke's daughter, Rosalind, however, to stay, as she is the closest friend of his daughter, Celia. Orlando, who has been forced to flee his home due to the oppression from his brother, Oliver, comes to the Frederick's Duchy, and enters a wrestling tournament. On leaving the Duchy, Orlando encounters Rosalind, and it is love at first sight. Frederick then becomes angry, and banishes Rosalind. Celia decides to accompany her, along with a jester, Touchstone.

Rosalind and Celia disguise themselves as "Ganymede", a boy, and "Aliena", respectively, and venture into the Forest of Arden, where they eventually encounter the exiled Duke. Orlando, deeply in love, posts love poems on the trees in praise of Rosalind. Orlando comes across Ganymede, who tells him he can teach Orlando how to cure love by pretending to be Rosalind. At the same time, Phoebe, a shepherdess, falls in love with Ganymede, though he (she) continually rejects her. Sylvius, a shepherd, is in love with Phoebe, which complicates the matter. Meanwhile, Touchstone attempts to marry the simple farmgirl, Audrey, before he can be stopped by Jaques, a Lord who lives with the exiled Duke.

Orlando rescues Oliver from a lion in the forest, causing Oliver to repent and re-embrace his brother. Ganymede, Orlando, Phoebe, and Silvius are brought together to sort out who marries whom. Ganymede proposes that Orlando promise to marry Rosalind, and Phoebe promise to marry Silvius if she cannot marry Ganymede. The next day, Rosalind reveals herself. Orlando and Rosalind, Oliver and Celia, Silvius and Phoebe, and Touchstone and Audrey are all then married, and they learn that Frederick has also repented and decided to reinstate his brother as the Duke.

== Cast ==
The film stars Laurence Olivier as Orlando

- Elisabeth Bergner as Rosalind. Rosalind is the daughter of the senior Duke. Bergner was an Austrian actress who had played Rosalind in Germany before moving to the US.
- Laurence Olivier as Orlando. Orlando is the youngest son of Sir Rowland de Boys. This film marked the first time that Olivier had played a Shakespeare character on film; among Olivier's Shakespeare performances in feature films, it was the only one not nominated for an Academy Award.
- Sophie Stewart as Celia. Celia is the daughter of Duke Frederick.
- Henry Ainley as Duke Senior, who has been banished.
- Leon Quartermaine as Jaques. Jaques is an inquisitive and melancholy Lord attending Duke Senior.
- Felix Aylmer as Duke Frederick, who has banished his brother.
- John Laurie as Oliver, Orlando's brother.

== Production ==
The 1936 adaptation was directed in London by Paul Czinner, an Austrian Jew who fled his home country to avoid political persecution. The film stars his wife, Elizabeth Bergner, also an Austrian Jewish refugee. To the persecuted, the escape to the Forest of Arden does not simply represent, as Celia sees it, a place to spend time and relax so much as an escape to freedom. This view is reflected in the film created by refugees, and speaks to other refugees and exiles.

== Music ==
The film is notable for being composed by William Walton, who was to become Olivier's longtime musical collaborator, scoring his films of Henry V, Hamlet and Richard III. Olivier defended Walton's score for the film Battle of Britain against its replacement by Ron Goodwin's.

== Reception ==
Writing for The Spectator in 1936, Graham Greene gave the film a mixed review. When considering the film as a work of Shakespeare, Greene noted that the film maintained a relatively high level of faithfulness to the original play despite the British Board of Film Censors' disapprobation of anything remotely approaching immodesty. Greene praised the acting of Bergner and Olivier, although he expressed dissatisfaction with that of Ainley and Quartermaine. When considering the film as a cinematic experience, Greene found it to be "less satisfactory". Criticizing Czinner for treating the medium as little more than a larger stage with "far too many dull middle-length shots from a fixed camera", Greene suggested that the presentation of the story was disappointing.
