= Bryden Thomson =

Scottish conductor (1928–1991)

Bryden Thomson (16 July 1928 – 14 November 1991) was a Scottish conductor, remembered especially for his championship of British and Scandinavian composers. His recordings include influential surveys of the orchestral music of Hamilton Harty and Arnold Bax. He was principal conductor of several British orchestras, including the Ulster Orchestra, which flourished under his tenure.

== Biography ==
=== Early life and studies ===
Bryden ("Jack") Thomson was born in Ayr and grew up playing the violin and cello. Soon after entering the Royal Scottish Academy of Music in Glasgow on a scholarship at the age of 15, he was called up to serve in the Highland Light Infantry, where he played the piano in the regimental band and taught himself the clarinet. After the war, he returned to his studies at the Royal Scottish Academy of Music. In 1954, he moved to Germany to study conducting, first with Hans Schmidt-Isserstedt at the newly founded Hochschule für Musik in Hamburg, and then with Igor Markevitch at the Mozarteum University of Salzburg.

=== Career ===
Following a post as assistant conductor of the BBC Scottish Orchestra (1958–1962), Bryden Thomson held posts as principal conductor of several British orchestras, including the BBC Northern Symphony Orchestra (1968–1973), the BBC Welsh Symphony Orchestra (1978–1982) and the Ulster Orchestra (1977–1985). Between 1984 and 1987 he was principal conductor of the Irish RTÉ Symphony Orchestra. He was also briefly chief conductor of the Scottish National Orchestra (1988–1990), being only the second Scotsman to hold that post.

As an opera conductor, Thomson also worked with the Norwegian National Opera and Ballet, the Royal Swedish Opera and the Scottish Opera.

Thomson was a committed interpreter of British music. He helped revive the popularity of the music of Arnold Bax by making an extensive series of CD recordings for Chandos Records (with the Ulster orchestra and the London Philharmonic Orchestra), including many of the tone poems and an acclaimed cycle of the symphonies. He did a similar service for the music of Irish composer Hamilton Harty by recording the collected orchestral works with the Ulster Orchestra, again for Chandos. He also set down with Chandos well received series of recordings of orchestral music by Elgar, Vaughan Williams and Walton. Other British composers he championed include Alun Hoddinott, Daniel Jones, Kenneth Leighton, Thomas Wilson and Grace Williams.

A cycle of Martinů symphonies recorded with the Scottish National Orchestra between 1989 and 1990 has been critically praised. Thomson also cultivated a keen interest in Nordic composers such as Holmboe, Nielsen, Sallinen and Sibelius. His interpretations of Nielsen have been much admired, including a recording of the Symphony No. 4 and Symphony No. 6 with the Scottish National Orchestra, which turned out to be his last recording.

=== Personal life and legacy ===
Thomson died of cancer in Dublin, in November 1991. In 2003, his widow, Mary Ellison Thomson, bequeathed his collection of scores to the National Library of Ireland, and in 2008 she set up the Bryden Thomson Trust in support of young conductors.
