= Portsmouth Point (Walton) =

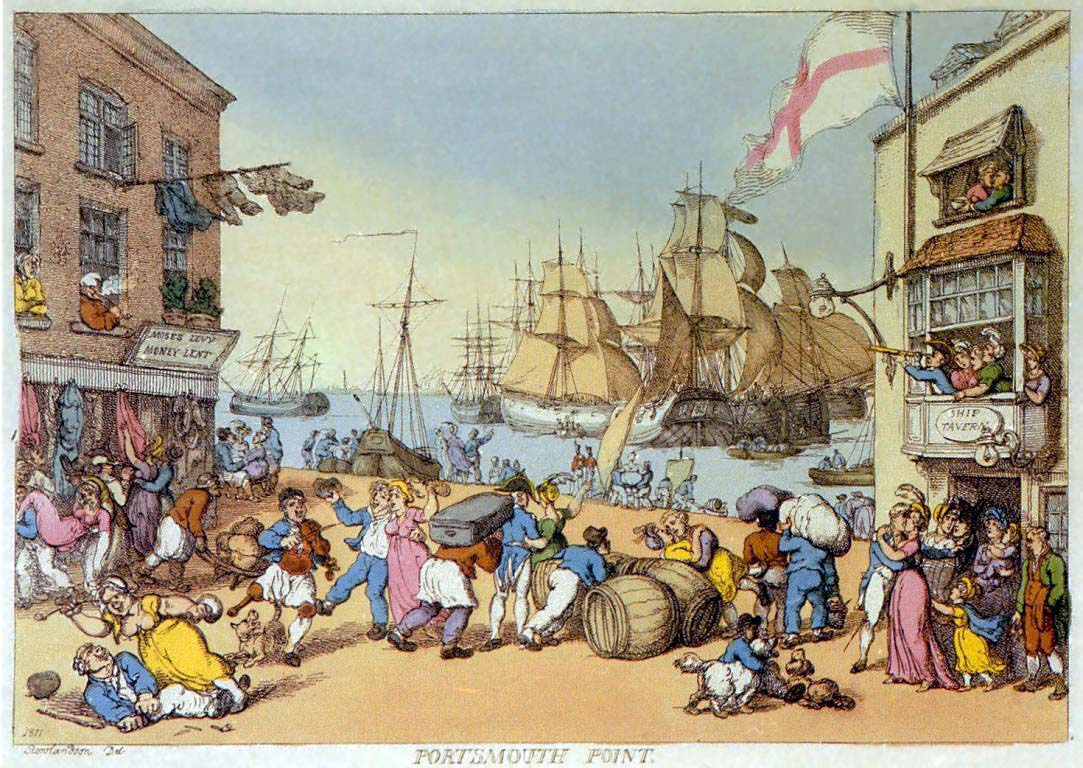
"Portsmouth Point", an etching by Thomas Rowlandson.

Portsmouth Point is an overture for orchestra by the English composer William Walton, composed in 1925. The work was inspired by Rowlandson's print depicting Portsmouth Point. Walton recalled that the main musical had come into his mind whilst riding on a route 22 bus in London. Walton dedicated the score to the poet Siegfried Sassoon, who had recommended that Oxford University Press publish the score. The score was first published in piano-duet form in 1925. The full orchestral score was published in 1928.

The overture was selected for performance at the 1926 International Society for Contemporary Music festival, and received its first performance in Zürich on 22 June 1926, conducted by Volkmar Andreae. The first London performance was on 28 June 1926, with Eugene Goossens conducting the overture as an interval work in the midst of a Diaghilev ballet performance. Walton himself conducted the overture at The Proms in 1927. Constant Lambert later prepared a version of the overture, with a reduced orchestration, from Walton's original, and also with simplified time signatures. Lambert first conducted this version in 1932.

Portsmouth Point depicts in musical form the rumbustious life of British 18th century sailors. Commentators have noted the influence of Igor Stravinsky's music and of jazz in the rhythms of the score, as well as the rhythm of the Catalan sardana dance.

In 1953, Walton briefly quoted this work in his contribution to the collaborative work Variations on an Elizabethan Theme.
