= Farrar (surname) =

Farrar is an occupational surname for a blacksmith or ironworker derived from the Latin ferrarius, Middle English Ferror or Anglo-Norman ferrur. Alternate spellings are Farrer, Ferrar and Farrow.

== Origins ==
There are records of an Osbert le ferrur and Peter le ferrour previous to the Poll Tax of 1377, but in those cases ferrur is not a name, it is an occupation i.e. Thomas the horseshoer.

The subsidy roll (Poll Tax of 1379), for the town of Elland, Halifax parish, Morley Wapentake, West Riding of Yorkshire lists a Johannes de Helistones, fferror & uxor (John of Helistones, Ferror and (his) wife, indicating that he was a "ferror"; also in the same subsidy roll is Henricus de Langfeld', ffranklayn, & uxor, which translates into Henry of Langfeld, freeman and (his) wife. By 1350 surnames were taking hold in the south of England, but it wasn't until around 1450 that surnames were used in the north (including Yorkshire).

The earliest documented appearance of the surname is the Register of Freemen of York, 1410–1411 with Johannes Ferror, a littestar (dyer of wool or lister, litster). Due to varying levels of literacy and regional dialects, the name could be written as Farrar, Pharo, Farra, Ferrar, Farrer, Ferrers, or Farrow.

As an example of how the spelling can change over time: Henry Ferror is listed in Halifax Wills being Abstracts and Translations 1545–1559. His son William Ferror's will. His grandson John Farrer's will, and his great-grandson William Farrar. Another variant: Will of Henry Fareher of Halifax, 1542. Lord (Thomas) Farrer of Abinger, in his Farrer (and some variants) Wills and Administrations, lists many related and unrelated Farrars, with a variety of spellings who left Wills.

The surname is found, in England, originally in those areas in which there were deposits of iron and thus an iron producing industry.

Bearers of the surname belong to various haplogroups including E-M2, I-M233, I-M253, J-M172, R-M269, R-YP5578.

== Armorial bearings ==
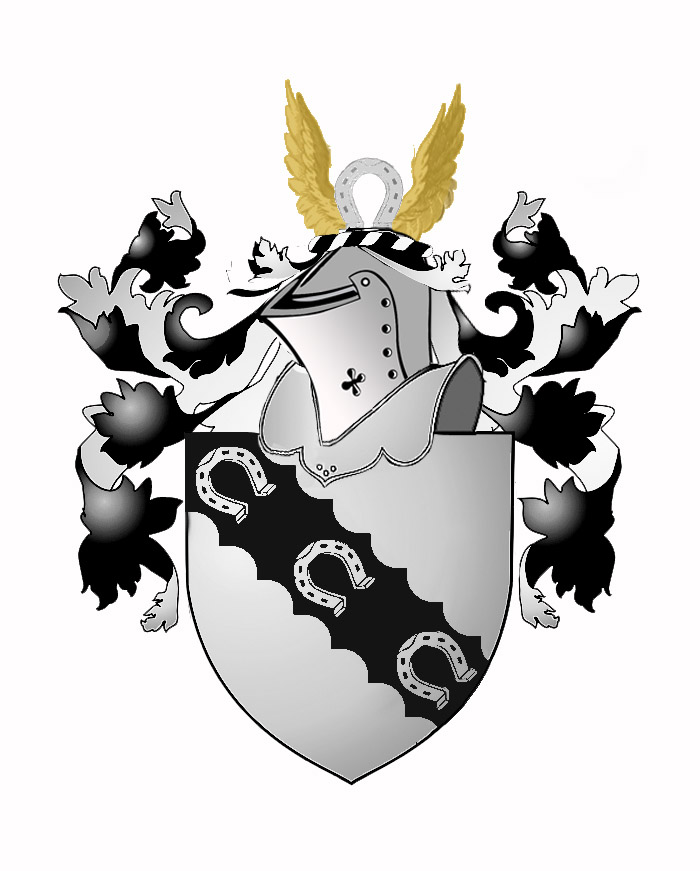
Coat of arms and crest for William Farrar's father, John Farrar of Croxton and London, esquire

There is an apparent symbiotic relationship between the surname and armorial bearings issued to various houses of Farrar/Farrer/Ferrar, all of which have, on a bend, three horseshoes and some have a horseshoe on the crest. Such as Fairer of Warcorp Tower, Westmoreland And pedigrees recorded in the Visitation of Surrey and Visitation of Hertford. The arms of Nicholas Ferrar.

FERRAR of Westwood Place in Worplesdon. Arms: Argent on a bend engrailed Sable three horse-shoes of the first, a crescent for difference. Crest: A horse-shoe Argent between two wings displayed Or. As borne by Henry Farrer [Ferrer] of Westwood and his brother John Farrer of Brierly, Yorkshire, sons of John Farrer of Croxton, Lincolnshire, 2nd son of William Farrer of Ewood Hall, Yorkshire West Riding. (see Visitation of Surrey and Hertfordshire above and Pedigrees of the Families of the County Yorkshire)

FARRER: Bryan Farrer, JP, of Binnegar Hall, Dorset, (1858–1944), grandson of James William Farrer of Ingleborough, Yorkshire, Senior Master in Chancery, (1785–1863), had issue Captain John Oliver Farrer, MC, (1894–1942), father of William Oliver Farrer, MA (Oxon), of Highlands, Fernhurst, Haslemere, solicitor, (b.1926); and Sir Walter Leslie Farrer, KCVD, BA (Oxon), of Charlwood Place Farm, Horsley, solicitor, (b.1900). The said James William Farrer had a 2nd son the Rev. Matthew Thomas Farrer, MA, of Ingleborough, (1816–89), Vicar of Addington and Perpetual Curate of Shirley. Arms: Quarterley, 1 and 4, Argent on a bend engrailed Sable three horseshoes of the field (Farrer); 2 and 3, Or gutté-de-sang a bend Gules. Crest: A horseshoe between two wings erect Proper. Motto: Ferre va ferme.

FARRER: Thomas Farrer, 1st Baron Farrer, of Abinger Hall, Dorking, (1819–99), was created Baron Farrer of Abinger, 1893. The title became extinct on the death of Oliver Farrer, 4th Baron Farrer in 1954. Arms: Argent on a bend engrailed Sable four horse shoes of the field. Crest: a quatrefoil with a horseshoe between two wings all Argent. Supporters: on either side a horse reguardant Argent gorged with a riband pendant therefrom an escutcheon both Sable charged with two horseshoes palewise Argent. Motto: Ferre va ferme.

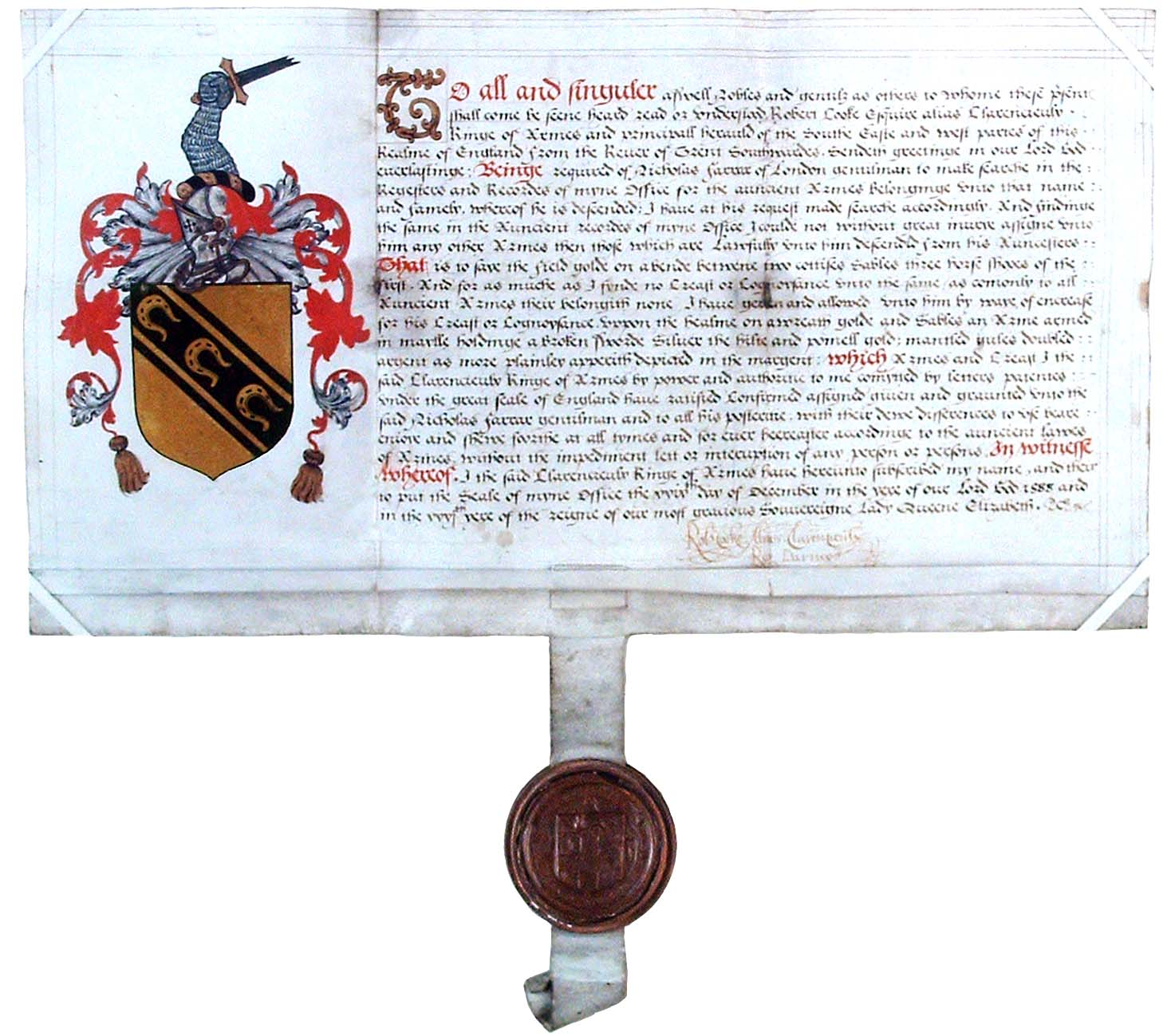
Coat of Arms for Nicholas Ferrar of Little Giddings

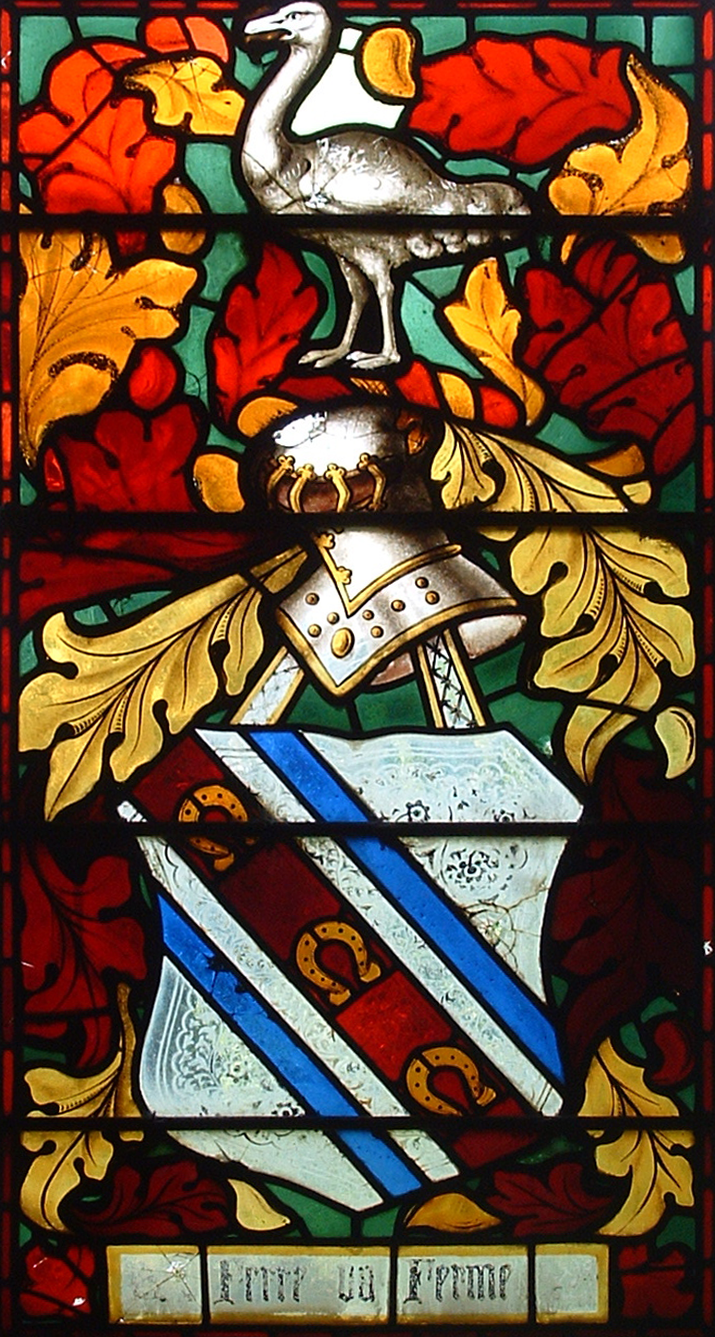
Ferrers of Piddington

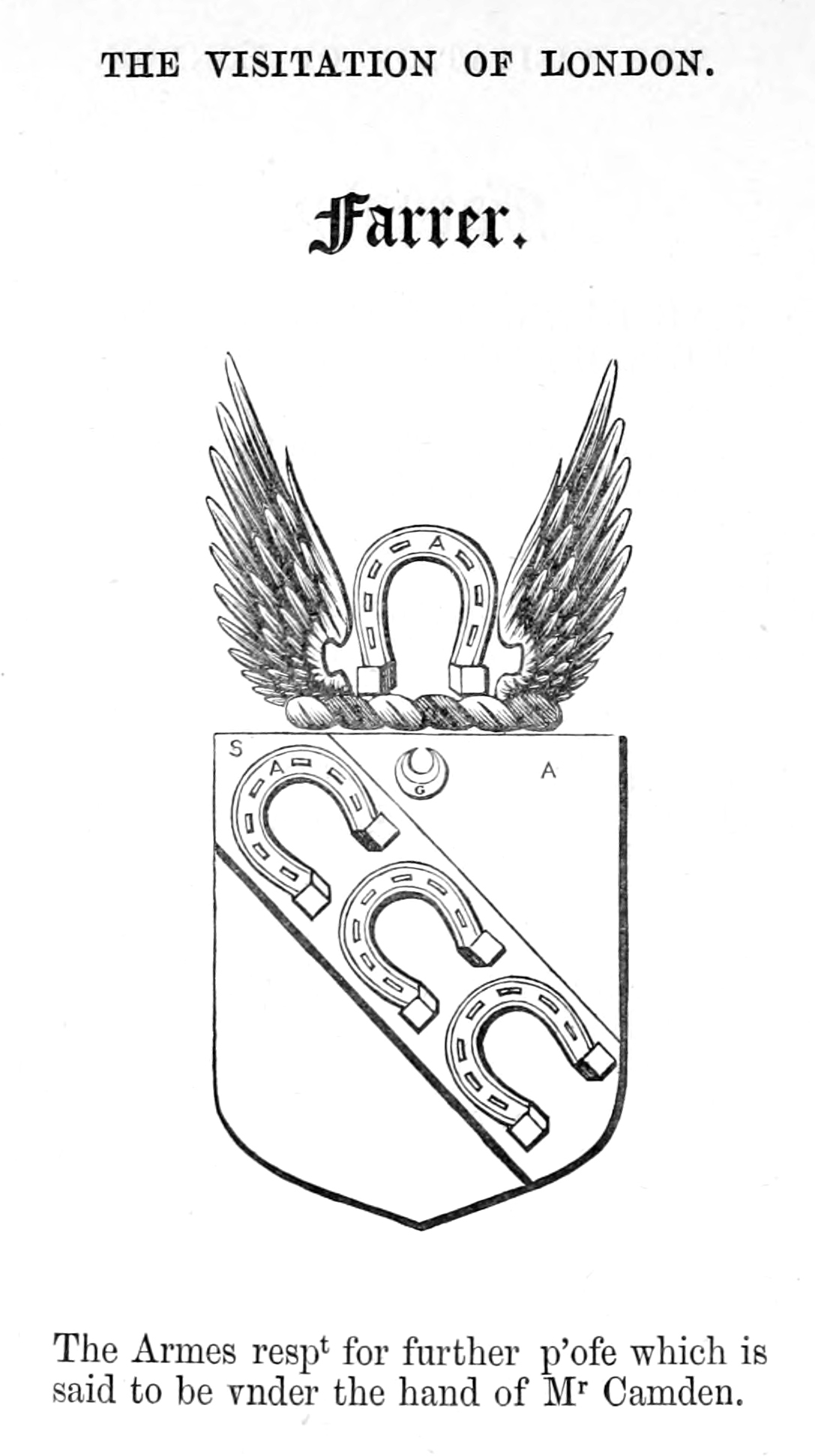
Coat of Arms of Ralph Farrer, grocer, from the Visitation of London

== Notable people with the surname ==
- Alexander K. Farrar (c. 1814–1878), American planter and politician from Mississippi
- Andrew Farrar (b. 1962), Australian rugby league player and coach
- Anthony Farrar-Hockley (1924–2006), British general and historian
- Ben Farrar (b. 1986), Australian rugby league footballer
- Cecily Jordan Farrar (c. 1600–16??), early female settler of the Jamestown colony
- Bernard Gaines Farrar Jr (1831–1916), American Civil War General
- David J. Farrar, (1921–2021), British engineer
- David Farrar (actor) (1908–1995), British actor
- David Farrar (blogger) (b. 1967), New Zealand blogger and pollster
- Edgar Howard Farrar (1849–1922), American corporate lawyer and political activist
- Ernest Farrar (1885–1918), English composer
- Eugenia Farrar (1875–1966), American singer and philanthropist
- Frank Farrar (1929–2021), American politician from South Dakota
- Frederic Farrar (1831–1903), British cleric, schoolmaster and writer
- Fred Farrar (c. 1883–?), English rugby league footballer
- Geraldine Farrar (1882–1967), American opera singer
- James Farrar (poet) (1923–1944), British writer and poet
- Janet Farrar (b. 1950), British occultist
- Jay Farrar (b. 1966), American musician
- Jeremy Farrar (b. 1961), British epidemiologist, Chief Scientist of the World Health Organization and former director of the Wellcome Trust
- Jessica Farrar (b. 1966), American politician
- John Farrar (disambiguation), several people
- John C. Farrar (1896–1974), American editor, writer and publisher, a founder of Farrar, Straus and Giroux
- John Percy Farrar (1857–1929), English mountaineer
- Lysander Farrar (1812–1876), American lawyer and politician from New York
- Margaret Farrar (1897–1984), American journalist and crossword puzzle editor
- Mike Farrar (contemporary), British civil servant
- Nicholas Ferrar (1592–1637), English scholar, courtier, businessman and cleric
- Orion R. Farrar (1866–1929), American composer and band director
- Preston W. Farrar (1805/06–1850), American lawyer and politician from Louisiana and Mississippi
- Robert Farrar, British writer
- Ronald T. Farrar (1935–2020), American journalist and academic
- Sam Farrar (b. 1978), bassist of American rock band Phantom Planet
- Sid Farrar (1859–1935), infielder for the Philadelphia Quakers and Philadelphia Athletics
- Stewart Farrar (1916–2000), British Wiccan author, husband of Janet Farrar
- Timothy Farrar (1747–1849), justice of the New Hampshire Supreme Court
- Tyler Farrar (b. 1984), American cyclist
- Vince Farrar (1947–2017), English rugby league footballer and coach
- William Farrar (American football), American football official, player and coach
- William H. Farrar (1826–1873), mayor of Portland, Oregon
- William Farrar (councillor) (1583–1637), English settler of Virginia, husband of Cecily Jordan Farrar

== Fictional characters ==
- Edward Ferrars, character from Sense and Sensibility

== See also ==
- Farrow (surname)
- Ferrer (surname)
- Farrer (disambiguation)#People
