= Farrer =

Farrer may refer to:

== People ==
- Alisha Farrer (born 1993), Australian actress and model
- Austin Farrer (1904–1968), English theologian, philosopher, and friend of C. S. Lewis
- Buster Farrer (1936–2025), South African cricketer
- Claude Farrer (1862–1890), English tennis player
- Frances Farrer (1895–1977), General Secretary of the Women's Institute
- Henry Farrer (1844–1903), English-born American artist
- Joe Farrer (born 1962), member of the Arkansas House of Representatives
- Josie Farrer (born 1947), member for the Western Australian Legislative Assembly seat of Kimberley
- Julia Farrer (born 1950), English artist
- Leslie Farrer (1900–1984), British solicitor
- Mabel Farrer, one of the United Kingdom's first female police officers and Cumbria's first female Special Constable
- Matthew Farrer (footballer) (1852–1928), English amateur footballer who appeared in the 1875 and 1876 FA Cup Finals
- Sir Matthew Farrer (1929–2023), British solicitor
- Reginald Farrer (1880–1920), pioneering English botanist
- Thomas Farrer, 1st Baron Farrer (1819–1899), English statistician
- Thomas Charles Farrer (1838–1891), English-born painter who worked in the United States
- Walter Farrer (1862–1934), British Church of England priest, most notably Archdeacon of Wells
- William Farrer (1845–1906), Australian agricultural scientist

== Other uses ==
- Farrer, Australian Capital Territory, a suburb of Canberra, Australia, named for William Farrer
- Farrer & Co, a London law firm
- Division of Farrer, also named after William Farrer, is an electorate of the Australian House of Representatives in rural New South Wales
- Farrer hypothesis, a biblical theory
- Farrer Hall, a residential college at Monash University
- Farrer Memorial Agricultural High School, an agricultural school for boys near Tamworth, New South Wales, Australia

== See also ==
- Farrer Park (disambiguation)
- Farrier (disambiguation)
- Baron Farrer (the Farrer Baronets)
- Farrar (disambiguation)
- Farrer family tree, showing the relationship between some of the above
