= Farrow (surname) =

Farrow is a hypercorrected form of Ferror (Farrar), an occupational surname for a blacksmith or an ironworker, an old name of early Medieval English and French origin. The name derives from the Middle English and Old French terms "ferrer, ferreor, ferrur, ferour" (meaning "smith"), derivatives of "fer" (meaning "iron" in French), from the Latin "ferrum". The development of the surname shows the usual Medieval English change in pronunciation (and thence spelling) from "-er" to "-ar" and "-ow" endings.

Due to varying levels of literacy, and regional dialects the name morphs back and forth from Farrar, Pharo, Farra, Ferrar, Farrer, and Farrow, the name itself did not change, but the spelling of it depended upon the scrivener.

The surname is found, in England, originally in those areas in which there were deposits of iron and thus an iron producing industry.

Bearers of the surname belong to various haplogroups including E-M2, I-M233, I-M253, J-M172, R-M269, R-YP5578

== Notable people ==
- Amariah Farrow (born 1980), professional football player in the Canadian Football League
- Bill Farrow (1918–2003), American professional basketball player
- Brad Farrow (born 1956), Canadian judoka
- David Farrow Maxwell (1900–1985), eightieth president of the American Bar Association
- Elizabeth Farrow (1926–2010), All-American Girls Professional Baseball League player
- Ernie Farrow (1928–1969), American jazz multi-instrumentalist
- George Farrow (1913–1980), English footballer
- Graham Farrow (born 1965), English playwright and screenwriter
- Jake Farrow (born 1978), television writer and actor
- James Farrow (politician) (1827–1892), 19th century politician
- Jane Farrow, Canadian author and broadcaster
- Jo Farrow, British broadcast meteorologist
- John Farrow (baseball) (1853–1914), also known as Jack, American Major League Baseball player
- John Farrow (1904–1963), Australian film director
- John Farrow (author), pen name of Trevor Ferguson (born 1947), Canadian novelist
- Jonathan Farrow (born 1984), English cricketer
- Joseph Farrow (c. 1652–1692), English cleric
- Kenneth Farrow (1924–2007), English Police officer and recipient of the George Cross
- Kenneth Farrow (American football) (born 1993), American football player
- Margaret Farrow (1934–2022), American politician from Wisconsin
- Mark Farrow, graphic designer
- Mia Farrow (born 1945), American actress
- Nigel Farrow (born 1963), English cricketer
- Paul Farrow (born 1964), American politician from Wisconsin
- Prudence Farrow (born 1948), American actress
- Ronan Farrow (born 1987), American human rights activist, son of Woody Allen and actress Mia Farrow
- Samuel Farrow (1775–1824), American politician from South Carolina
- Stuart Farrow, South African politician
- Thomas Farrow (1833–1916), Canadian merchant and political figure
- Tisa Farrow (1951–2024), American actress
- William G. Farrow (1918–1942), American pilot on the Doolittle Raid in the Second World War
- William Hastings Farrow (1893–1946), British flying ace in the First World War

== See also ==
- Faro (disambiguation)
- Farrar (surname)
- Ferrer (surname)
