= Farrar =

Farrar may refer to:

- Cape Farrar, a headland on the Boothia Peninsula in Nunavut, Canada
- Farrar, Georgia, a US unincorporated community
- Farrar, Iowa, a US unincorporated community
- Farrar Landing, Michigan, an unincorporated community
- Farrar, Missouri, a US unincorporated community
- Farrar, North Carolina, a US unincorporated community
- Farrar, Northern Territory, a suburb in Australia
- Farrar, Texas, a US unincorporated community
- Farrar Hill, Tennessee, a US unincorporated community
- Farrar's Island, a peninsula on the James River in Virginia
- River Farrar, Scotland
- Farrar (album), a 2008 album by Scottish fiddler Duncan Chisholm
- Farrar (surname), people with the surname Farrar

== See also ==
- Farrar & Rinehart, former name of American publishing firm Rinehart & Company
- Farrar, Straus and Giroux, American publishing firm
- Marvin, Welch & Farrar, 1970s British and Australian music group
- Farrer (disambiguation)
- Ferrar, a surname
- Faraar (disambiguation), the title of various Indian films
