= Ferrier (surname) =

Ferrier is a surname of European origin.

== People named Ferrier ==
Notable people with this family name include:

- Adam Ferrier, Australian psychologist, writer, and creative strategist
- Arnaud du Ferrièr (c.1508–1585), French lawyer and diplomat
- Arthur Ferrier (1891–1973), Scottish artist, illustrator and cartoonist
- Claude Ferrier (1879–1935), Scottish architect
- David Ferrier (1843–1924), Scottish medical scientist
- Gabriel Ferrier (1847–1914), French painter and orientalist
- Ian Ferrier (1954–2023), Canadian poet, musician, and cultural arts organizer
- James Ferrier (politician) (1800–1888), merchant and politician
- James Frederick Ferrier (1808–1864), Scottish metaphysical writer
- Jim Ferrier (1915–1986), Australian golfer
- Joan Ferrier (1953–2014), Surinamese-Dutch ortho pedagogue
- Johan Ferrier (1910–2010), Surinamese politician (first President)
- John Ferrier (c.1759–1836), Royal Navy officer
- John Todd Ferrier (1855–1943), former Congregational pastor in Macclesfield, England, left the church in 1903 to found the Order of the Cross
- Jón Ferrier, former CEO of Gulf Keystone Petroleum
- Julie Ferrier (born 1971), French actress, comedian, dancer, writer and theater director
- Kathleen Ferrier (1912–1953), English contralto
- Kathleen Ferrier (politician) (born 1957), Dutch politician (daughter of Johan)
- Leanne Ferrier (born 1980), Australian race car driver
- Margaret Ferrier (born 1960), Scottish Member of Parliament
- Morgan Ferrier (born 1994), England footballer
- Noel Ferrier (1930–1997), Australian television personality, comedian, actor, raconteur, and theatrical producer
- Paul Ferrier (1843–1920), French dramatist
- René Ferrier (1936–1998), French footballer
- Robin Ferrier (1932–2013), Scottish organic chemist
- Scott Ferrier (born 1974), Australian decathlete
- Susan Edmonstone Ferrier (1782–1854), Scottish novelist
- Tom Ferrier (born 1981), British racing driver
- Walter Frederick Ferrier (1865–1950), Canadian geologist
