= Ferrier =

Ferrier may refer to:

== Places ==
- Ferrier, Haiti, a commune in the Fort-Liberté Arrondissement, in the Nord-Est department of Haiti
- Ferrier Estate, a large council estate in Greenwich, London, UK
- Ferrier Peninsula, South Orkney Islands, Antarctica

== People ==
- Ferrier (surname)

== Other ==
- Ferrier carbocyclization, an organic reaction
- Ferrier rearrangement, an organic reaction

== See also ==
- Ferrières (disambiguation), various meanings of a French name
- Farrier (disambiguation)
- Feria (disambiguation)
