= David Farrar =

David Farrar may refer to:

- David Farrar (actor) (1908–1995), English actor
- David Farrar (basketball) (born c. 1947), American college basketball coach
- David Farrar (blogger) (born 1967), political activist, blogger and pollster in New Zealand
- Dave Farrar, British broadcaster
- David H. Farrar, academic and university administrator
- David J. Farrar (1921–2021), English engineer
