= Faria (disambiguation) =

Faria is both a surname and a given name.

Faria may also refer to:

== Places ==
- Faria (Barcelos), parish in the municipality of Barcelos, Portugal
- Faria, California, also known as Faria Beach, unincorporated community in Ventura County, California
- Paulo de Faria, municipality in the state of São Paulo, Brazil

== Other uses ==
- Faria Elementary School, a public school in Cupertino, California
- Faria: A World of Mystery and Danger, a video game produced by the Game Arts for the Nintendo Entertainment System
- Faria River, river in the state of Paraná, Brazil
- Castle of Faria, castle in the parish of Gilmonde, Barcelos, Portugal

== See also ==
- Farrier (disambiguation)
- Feria (disambiguation)
