= John Farrow (disambiguation) =

John Farrow (1904–1963) was an Australian-born American film director and screenwriter.

John Farrow may also refer to:

- John Farrow (baseball) (1853–1914), 19th century baseball player
- John Farrow (skeleton racer) (born 1982), Australian skeleton racer
- John Charles Farrow (born 1946), brother of Mia Farrow
- Trevor Ferguson (born 1947), a.k.a. John Farrow, Canadian author

== See also ==
- Jonathan Farrow (born 1984), cricketer
