= Farrier (disambiguation) =

A farrier is a specialist in equine hoof care.

Farrier may also refer to:

== People with the name ==
- Ancil Farrier (born 1986), Trinidadian football player
- Curt Farrier (born 1941), American football player
- David Farrier (born 1982), New Zealand journalist
- Fred Farrier (born 1972), American football coach and former player
- Ian Farrier (1947-2017), New Zealand boat designer
- Robert Farrier (1796–1879), English artist

== Other uses ==
- Operation Farrier, during the Second World War
- Farrier Marine, a boat builder of New Zealand
- MV Empire Farrier, a British ship

== See also ==
- Ferrier (disambiguation)
- Farrer (disambiguation)
- Faria (disambiguation)
