= Kenneth Farrow =

Kenneth Farrow may refer to:

- Kenneth Farrow (police officer) (1924–2007), British police officer
- Kenneth Farrow (American football) (born 1993), American football running back
