= Simon Murray (businessman) =

British businessman, adventurer and author (born 1940)

Simon Murray CBE
- Born: 25 March 1940 (age 86); Leicester, England
- Occupations: Chairperson; Non executive Director
- Known for: Businessman adventurer author
- Spouse: Jennifer Mather
- Children: 3

Simon Murray, CBE (born 25 March 1940) is a British Hong Kong–based businessman, adventurer, and author.

Murray is the oldest man to reach the South Pole unsupported, at the age of 63.

== Early life ==
Murray was born at Leicester, England, into an aristocratic family with some tradition of military service. His father belonged to a wealthy family. Murray's grandfather on his father's side retained a permanent suite at the Connaught Hotel, while his grandmother retained a similar suite at Claridges Hotel. Murray's father abandoned the family early on and Murray claims to have had no recollection of him at that time. An uncle paid for Murray to attend Bedford School, an independent school in Bedford, Bedfordshire. In 1960, he joined the French Foreign Legion, and served for five years in the 2nd Foreign Parachute Regiment (2e REP). During his service, he fought in the Algerian War against the Front de Libération National (FLN). After rising to the rank of Chief Corporal, he turned down an offer to attend Officers' School in France, and left the Legion in 1965 after completing his service. He wrote of his experiences in the Legion in the book Legionnaire, published in 1978. And later, based on his book he produced the autobiographical movie "Deserter" which released as a DVD.

== Business career ==
On leaving the Foreign Legion in 1965, he got married and moved to Hong Kong where he worked for Jardine Matheson for fourteen years. After that, he left to start his own company, Davenham Investments, a project advisory company. N.M.Rothschild took a 50% stake in Davenham. Amongst many high-profile deals, Davenham went on to represent Mitsui in the Singapore Mass Transit Railway project.

In 1984, Davenham was sold to Li Ka-Shing for US$20 million as a precursor to Murray becoming group managing director of Hutchison Whampoa. He stayed for ten years, initiating Hutchison's acquisition of Hong Kong Electric, and negotiating their entry into the oil business through their acquisition of Husky Oil. Whilst CEO of Hutchison, he founded a mobile phone company and, after turning it into the global brand "Orange", it was sold in 1999 for US$36 billion to Mannesmann.

From 1994 to 1998, Murray was the Executive Chairman of the Deutsche Bank Group in Asia. He then established his own company, General Enterprise Management Services Ltd (GEMS), a mid-sized investment group operating across Asia. In addition to this Murray was a founder of Distacom which made a number of mobile telecoms investments including Madacom in Madagascar, Spice Telecom in India and Sunday Communications in Hong Kong. He has also invested in other mobile operations in New Zealand, San Marino, Papua New Guinea and elsewhere.

Murray was the chairman of Glencore from 2011 to 2013. He later became chairman of Gulf Keystone Petroleum from 2013 to 2015. He has served on boards and held advisory positions with a number of other large companies, including Vodafone, Tommy Hilfiger Corporation, Vivendi Universal, Usinor SA, Hermes, General Electric (US), China National Offshore Oil Corporation (CNOOC), Macquarie Bank, N.M. Rothschild, and Bain (the consultancy company). He continues to serve on the advisory board of Lightbridge Corporation (US), and was on the Development Advisory Board of Imperial College, London.

Murray is currently the Executive Chairman of GEMS, and a board director of Cheung Kong Holdings Ltd, Orient Overseas (International) Ltd, Wing Tai Properties Ltd, Arnhold Holdings Ltd, Richemont SA, Essar Energy plc, Omnicorp Ltd and IRC Ltd.

== Adventurer ==
Following a suggestion by his wife, Murray joined Pen Hadow for a trek to the Geographic South Pole. The 1,200 km trek started in early December 2004 at Hercules Inlet on the Zumberge Coast, Antarctica and was completed when they reached the South Pole about two months later. They climbed up to 2,835 m above mean sea level on the way. Murray became the oldest man to reach the South Pole unsupported.

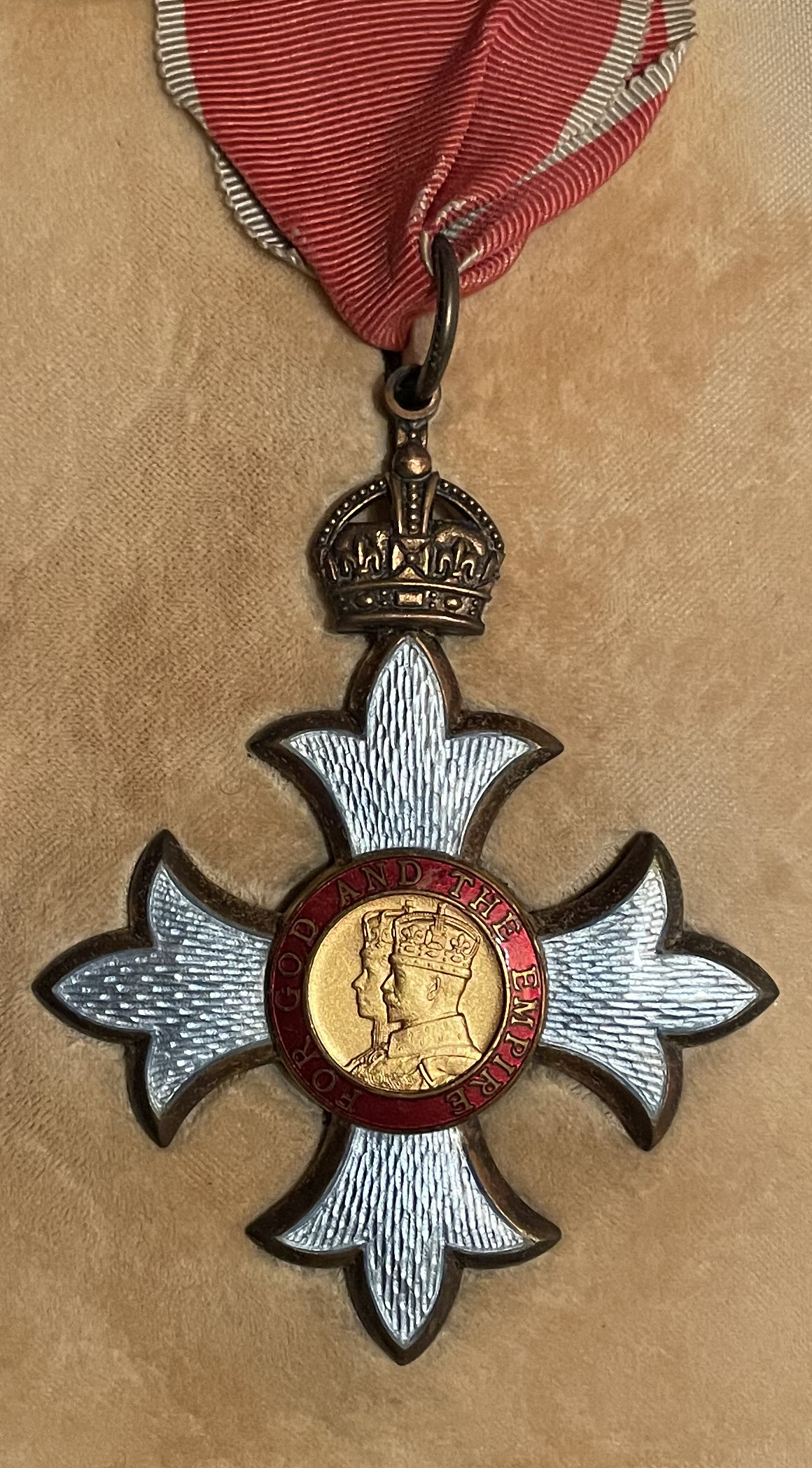

== Honours ==
Appointed CBE in 2013, Murray is also a Commandeur of the Order of Merit of the French Republic and a Chevalier de La Legion d’Honneur. He holds an honorary degree in Law, from the University of Bath and attended the (SEP) Stanford Executive Program in the US.

== Television ==
Murray presented 'The Legion is My Country', a BBC Radio 4 documentary (produced by Alec Reid) celebrating the 150th anniversary of the founding of the French Foreign Legion. It was broadcast on 26 May 1981. Also in the 1980s, Murray presented a documentary on the French Foreign Legion, where he explained the traditions and folklore that surround this elite force. He also appeared and contributed on the documentary series Escape to the Legion and Weaponology.

== Personal life ==
A kinsman of the Dukes of Atholl, Murray married in 1965 his long-time girlfriend, pilot Jennifer (née Mather), with whom he has three children and six grandchildren. She was the first woman to fly around the world in a helicopter.
