= Jennifer Murray =

American helicopter pilot

- Born: June 1940 (age 86); Providence, Rhode Island
- Known for: First helicopter circumnavigation of the globe by a woman
- Spouse: Simon Murray
- Children: 3

Jennifer Murray (née Mather; born June 1940 in Providence, Rhode Island) is a pilot. In 2000 she circumnavigated the globe in a Robinson R44 helicopter, travelling 36,000 miles (58,000 km) in 97 days, earning her the Guinness World Record for the first helicopter circumnavigation by a woman.

== Early life and education ==
Jennifer Mather was born in Providence, Rhode Island, in June 1940. She was educated at Downe House School in Berkshire, UK. Her paternal grandfather was Sir William Mather, the British industrialist who was chairman of Mather & Platt.

== Career ==
=== Fastest circumnavigation ===
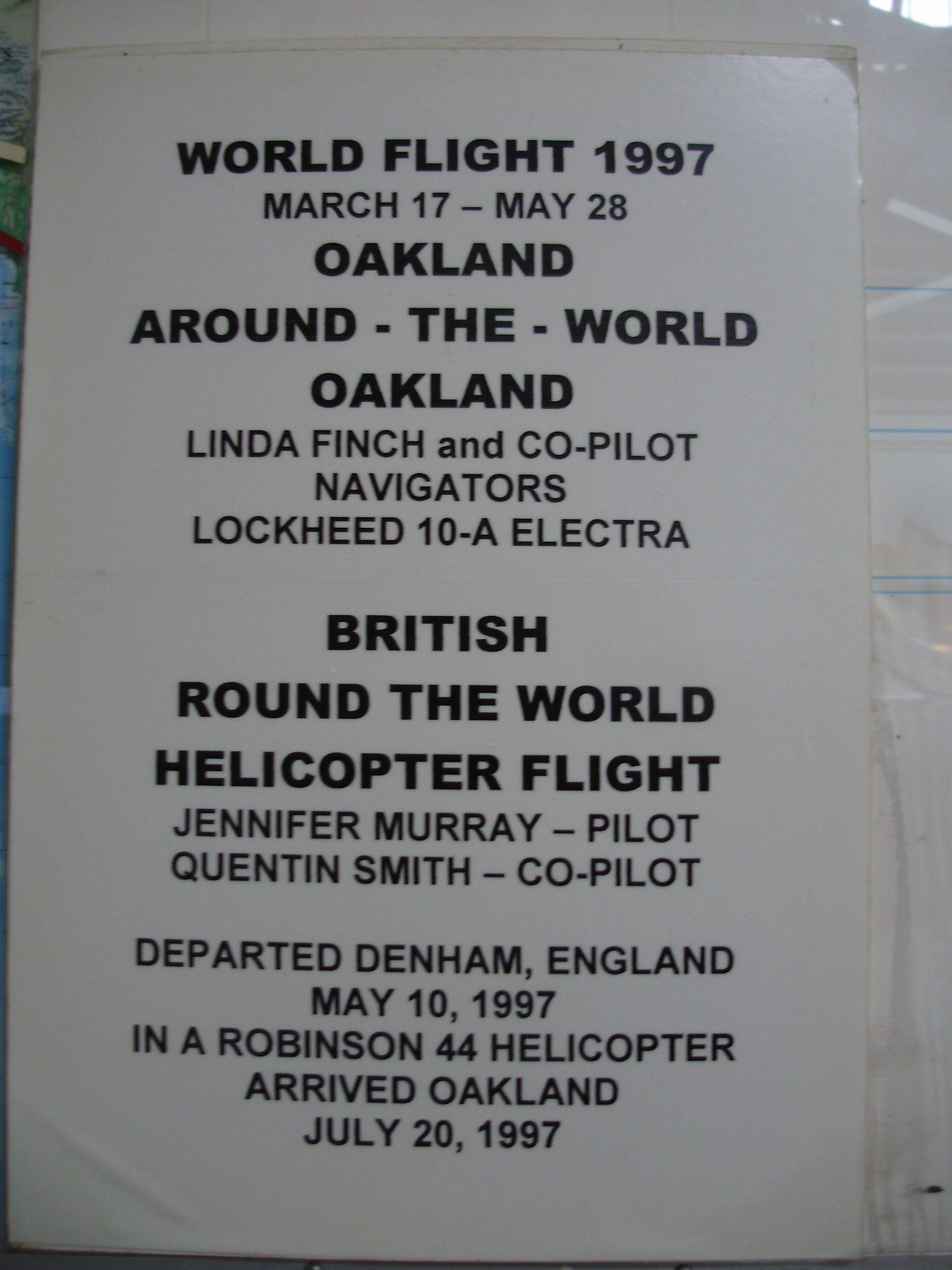
Display about her flight, at Oakland Aviation Museum.

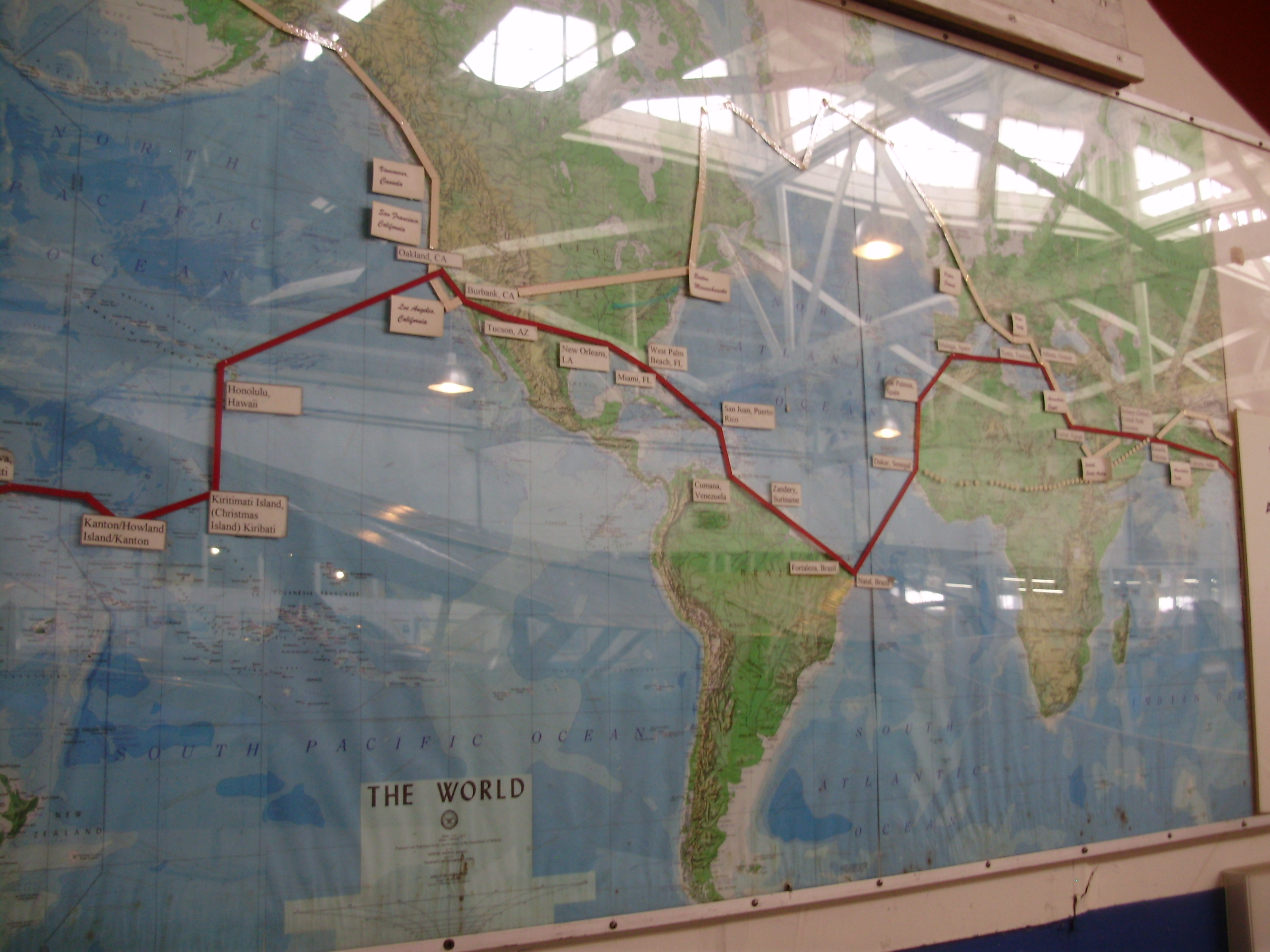
Map of her route (in white) around the world as displayed at Oakland Aviation Museum. The red route is that of Linda Finch's flight the same year

In August 1997, Murray became the first woman to fly a helicopter around the world when she co-piloted her Robinson R44 with Quentin Smith on the eastward circumnavigation. The 97-day flight was also an eastbound speed record for a piston-powered helicopter. The flight departed from Denham, Buckinghamshire, UK on 10 May 1997, and her stopover at Oakland Airport in California on 20 July is commemorated at the Oakland Aviation Museum. On 6 September 2000, Murray became the first woman to make a solo flight around the world in a helicopter and the first person to do so without autopilot.

=== Pole to pole ===
In 2007, Murray and co-pilot Colin Bodill became the first to land a helicopter on both North and South Poles, their second attempt. Their first, in 2003, ended in a near-fatal crash in Antarctica, after Murray had just become the first woman to fly a helicopter to the South Pole.

=== RacingThePlanet Nepal ===
At 71, Jennifer was an entrant in RacingThePlanet Nepal, a 250-kilometre (160 mi) ultramarathon starting on 20 November 2011. She withdrew after stage two.

== Personal life ==
Mather married Hong Kong businessman Simon Murray in 1966.

== Awards and honours ==
- Rhode Island Aviation Hall of Fame Inductee 2005
- The Gambia issued a postage stamp in her honour in 2004
- Royal Aero Club - 1997 Silver Medal, 2000 Britannia Trophy
- Brabazon Cup
- Harmon Trophy
- Inducted in Forest of Friendship
