= Feria (disambiguation) =

Feria is Latin for "holiday".

Feria may refer to:

- Feria, in Roman Rite liturgy, a day of the week, other than Sunday, on which no feast is celebrated
- Feria (festival) festival in Spain and southern France, characterized by bullfights, bull running in the streets, bodegas
- Feria, San Felipe, Zambales barangay in the Philippines
- Typhoon Feria
- Feria, a composition by Maurice Ravel (1875-1937)
- Feria, a composition by Magnus Lindberg
- Feria: The Darkest Light, a Spanish fantasy thriller television series released in 2022

== See also ==
- Faria (disambiguation)
- Ferrier (disambiguation)
