= Gulf Keystone Petroleum =

British oil and gas exploration company operating in Iraqi Kurdistan

Gulf Keystone Petroleum Limited
- Type: Public limited company
- Traded as: LSE: GKP
- Industry: Oil and gas industry
- Founded: 2001
- Headquarters: London, England; Hamilton, Bermuda
- Number of locations: Kurdistan Region of Iraq
- Key people: Jaap Huijskes (Chairman); Jón Ferrier (CEO)
- Services: Oil exploration and production
- Number of employees: Over 600
- Website: www.gulfkeystone.com

Gulf Keystone Petroleum Limited is an independent oil and gas exploration and production company that operates in the Kurdistan region of Iraq. It is also the operator of the Shaikan oil field. The company was listed on the main market of the London Stock Exchange on September 8, 2004. Jon Harris serves as its chief executive officer.

The company was founded by UAE, Kuwaiti and US private equity firms and has been registered in Bermuda since 2001, with branch offices in Erbil, Kurdistan and London, UK. The company owns production sharing contracts for one exploration block in Iraqi Kurdistan through its subsidiary, Gulf Keystone Petroleum International.

== History ==
Gulf Keystone's initial operations in Algeria were rather less successful than had been hoped, and the share price weakened as a consequence. RAK Petroleum PCL announced an agreement in April 2007 to acquire Gulf Keystone Petroleum, but the transaction was not completed. The company continued as an independent and altered its strategy, working with the American company Texas Keystone International to complete the acquisition of exploration acreage in Kurdistan. A small American company called Excalibur Ventures had initially drawn the attention of Texas Keystone to the possibility of acquiring exploration acreage in Kurdistan. This initially included a majority position in the Shaikan block, for which Gulf Keystone would be the operator, and a minority position in the Akri-Bijeel block, for which MOL would be the operator (op. cit). In the summer of 2009 the Shaikan wildcat well was a success, and it was realized that the volume of oil in Shaikan was much greater than had been expected from the pre-drill assessments made by the company's geophysicists. The share price strengthened considerably as a consequence, moving beyond its previous high levels. As time passed and more wells were drilled, the volume of oil judged to be in Shaikan continued to rise.

=== Shaikan oil field ===
Shaikan is an oilfield in Northern Iraq, in which Gulf Keystone Petroleum currently holds 75% of a production sharing agreement with the Kurdish Regional Government. It is notably one of the largest Super Giant oilfields discovered in the last 50 years. The Shaikan oil field has a production capacity of 40,000 barrels per day (6,400 m^{3}/d). On 24 June 2018, Gulf Keystone Petroleum said it had agreed with the Kurdistan Region of Iraq and Hungary's MOL to increase oil production capacity to 55,000 barrels per day (8,700 m^{3}/d) in the following years.

Shaikan was declared a commercial discovery on August 1, 2012, following a five-well appraisal program. In June 2013, the Field Development Plan was approved and in December 2013 crude oil exports from the Shaikan field commenced. Initially independent estimates placed the gross oil-in-place (OIP) volume at 13.7 billion barrels (P50) potentially making it one of the largest oilfields discovered in Iraqi Kurdistan. More recent and accurate CPR reports are not mentioned here.

The oilfield covers an area of some 130 to 150 square kilometres (50 to 58 sq mi), and comprises a series of limestone reservoirs stacked upon each other. These reservoirs encompass a very long period of geological time, from the Cretaceous which ended some 65 million years ago to the Triassic, which began some 248 million years ago. Gulf Keystone believe that hydrocarbons may also exist in the more ancient Permian formation.

An audit of the Shaikan oilfield published in March 2014 appeared to show that dramatically less oil could be recovered than had been previously advised and expected. The audit implied a recovery of 12% of the oil in the Shaikan reservoir and indicated that Shaikan oil field contained just 9.215 billion barrels (1.4651×10^{9} m^{3}) of which just 545 million barrels (86.6×10^{6} m^{3}) could hope to be recovered net to Gulf Keystone This appeared to be significantly less than the 13.7 billion barrels (2.18×10^{9} m^{3}) previously claimed by Gulf Keystone Petroleum to be in place in the field. Retail investors with a lack of appreciation for calculations believe this to be an apparently low recovery level due to presentation issues, because elsewhere the audit expressed the possibility that the recovery could be some 20%. As a direct consequence of the perceived negative audit the share price of Gulf Keystone Petroleum crashed by 40% in the days following the publication of this official audit. This audit was reviewed between June and September 2015 in order to take account of additional well and substantial production data. This resulted in the Proved and Probable Reserves increasing by 114%, from 299 million to 639 million barrels. The Proved, Probable and Possible Reserves rose by 152%, from 389 million to 982 million barrels.

The initial stages of production at Shaikan are to be natural reservoir pressure. Longer term, output from the wells will be maintained via the use of Electric Submersible Pumps, the re-injection of gas into the reservoir to help maintain pressure and reduce oil viscosity. Gulf Keystone has previously said that Shaikan should produce oil for 80 to 100 years with no clear unit production guidance. This is a statement, not a proven fact.

The former chief executive officer of Gulf Keystone explained to the market that the apparent reduction in the In Place oil at Shaikan was misleading. This was because the 13.7 billion barrels total included oil in the Cretaceous, Jurassic and Triassic reservoirs, whereas the headline figure in the 2014 audit covered only the Jurassic. The current phase of the development program is restricted to the Jurassic, which contains an enormous oil column of over 1000 meters in height. The auditors decided in 2014, because the current emphasis is on the Jurassic, to exclude the Cretaceous and Triassic from their Reserves assessment.

Evidence suggests that the Shaikan discovery is very substantial, and its significance is accentuated by the low success rate of wildcat exploration worldwide, which has been on a five to six-year downtrend. The chief financial officer of Gulf Keystone indicated in March 2015 that the likely recovery rate from Shaikan was likely to be significantly above the 12% level implied by the auditors in 2014.

The first phase of the development of Shaikan – "Phase Zero" – had a target of producing 40,000 barrels of Shaikan crude oil per day. This target was successfully met by the end of 2014. In 2015, the oil was being exported under agreements reached between the Kurdistan Regional Government and the National Government of Iraq. The export was initially using long-distance road tankers to the Turkish coast, but during the summer of 2015 the road tankers began being re-routed along a much shorter distance to the export pipeline at Faysh Khabur where the Shaikan crude is injected into the pipeline via a mixing plant operated by DNO (is a Norwegian oil and gas operator). A more efficient arrangement involving the installation of a pipeline connection directly into the Shaikan field is anticipated. On 11 May 2015 an output of 41,345 barrels per day was commemorated with a group photograph in Kurdistan (source: Gulf Keystone Petroleum). In August 2015 the 45,000 barrels per day level was reached.

Further phases, which will be implemented in the coming years, have previously been said by Gulf Keystone to target a longer-term production level of 40,000 to 500,000 barrels of Shaikan crude oil per day. Such a level would put Shaikan into an elite group of international oil fields. The company is not currently stating its long-term expectations, but in September 2015 it said that its next benchmark objective was 110,000 barrels of Shaikan crude oil per day.

The achievement of these very high output levels will involve drilling more production wells over the coming years, the construction of additional surface facilities to receive the oil from the wells, remove the associated gas and prepare the oil for export, and the connection into the export pipeline.

Whilst this will represent a substantial project, the total capital cost will be relatively modest by international standards. This is because of the high outputs anticipated per well, the relatively shallow depth of the reservoirs compared to modern deep drilling, and the readily accessible onshore operations which do not suffer from severe winters which can otherwise hamper production operations. The lifting costs per barrel of Shaikan crude are already among the lowest in the world. In September 2015 the company announced that new understandings of how the Shaikan reservoir was behaving would further reduce future capital expenditure levels because the wells would individually produce more oil and drain a greater proportion of the reservoir than was previously anticipated, thereby reducing the number of additional wells required.

In 2016, the Norwegian oil explorer DNO ASA announced that it had offered almost $300 million for heavily indebted UK rival Gulf Keystone Petroleum, because of its financial turmoil. Like other companies in the region, it has suffered from a protracted downturn in oil prices since mid-2014 and erratic payments from the regional government. To overcome the crisis, they will suffer significant dilution, if the restructuring goes ahead. Chief executive Jón Ferrier said that it was the only way to avoid liquidation at the time.

== Takeover speculation and litigation ==
In late 2011, Exxon Mobil announced it had signed exploration contracts for six blocks in the Kurdistan Region of Iraq, including one block adjacent to the Shaikan block. An article appeared in The Independent on Sunday on 18 December 2011 suggesting that a number of major oil companies were potentially interested in Gulf Keystone's discovery. A further article in that publication on 19 February 2012 stated that ExxonMobil had looked closely at Shaikan. Nothing was forthcoming and since then Exxon has relinquished several blocks. Its executive chairman, Todd Kozel, said "the one-time minnow's growth has been so extraordinary in the past two months that [it] would comfortably qualify for the FTSE 100 blue chip club ... We're not that little kid in short-pants anymore..." He claimed that the £3.5 billion market capitalization was due to the "world waking up" to the vast oil reserves the company possessed and "hoped that small private investors ... some of whom have risked their life-savings on GKP, would not be squeezed out by the big city firms".

The American company Excalibur Ventures secured third-party litigation funding for a high-profile trial in the Commercial Court in London (which Excalibur would subsequently lose) for around 30% of Gulf Keystone's key assets in Kurdistan, to which they claimed they were entitled because of their introduction of Texas Keystone to the opportunities which existed in Kurdistan. This impending trial acted as a further dampening effect upon investor sentiment. It was not until December 2013 that the Excalibur claim was fully dismissed by Lord Justice Christopher Clarke in a Judgement which was highly critical of Excalibur and also of the manner in which the "gargantuan in scale" litigation had been conducted against both Gulf Keystone and Texas Keystone.

Subsequent to removing the threat posed by Excalibur and moving toward the achievement of the "Phase Zero" production level of 40,000 barrels per day of production, disruption in the region caused by ISIS and the difficulties experienced by the Kurdistan authorities in paying fully for the oil being exported by three Kurdistan operators including Genel as well as Gulf Keystone continued to adversely affect market sentiment.

On 31 March 2015, GKP's chairman Simon Murray, formerly of Glencore and appointed in 2013, resigned amid a funding crisis at the company. He ignited fresh speculation about corporate activity involving Gulf Keystone when he revealed that the company had been involved in commercial talks with other oil companies. The company faced severe difficulties in collecting payments for oil from the Kurdistan government.
