= Christopher Palmer =

English composer, arranger and orchestrator (1946–1995)

Christopher Francis Palmer (9 September 1946 – 22 January 1995) was an English arranger, orchestrator, record producer and film score composer. He was also an author and lecturer, the biographer of composers, champion of lesser-known composers and commentator on film music and other musical subjects.

== Overview ==
Involved in a very wide range of projects, Palmer's output was prodigious and he came to be regarded as one of the finest symphonic orchestrators of his generation. He arranged music from the film scores and other music of William Walton, Malcolm Arnold, Ralph Vaughan Williams, Ernest Bloch. Artists who have performed his work include José Carreras, James Galway, Julian Lloyd Webber, and Jill Gomez.

Palmer was dedicated to the conservation, recording and promotion of classic film scores by composers such as Bernard Herrmann, Dimitri Tiomkin, Franz Waxman, Miklós Rózsa, Elmer Bernstein and others. He wrote full biographies as well as sleeve notes, radio scripts, reviews and articles on composers such as Benjamin Britten, Frederick Delius, Karol Szymanowski, Arthur Bliss, George Dyson, Herbert Howells, Maurice Ravel, Nikolai Tcherepnin and others. Outside the area of music, he put together anthologies of the prose of Arthur Machen and James Farrar.

== Biography ==
Palmer was born in Norfolk in 1946. He early showed interest in music, encouraged by his father, a RAF pilot, who had trained as a church organist. He was educated at Norwich School and studied the organ at Saxlingham, then went on to Trinity College, Cambridge, where he qualified in modern languages and music. His teachers at Cambridge included Peter le Huray and Sir David Willcocks.

His first involvement in film music was as a writer, through which he met many film composers in the United Kingdom and United States. He struck up a friendship with Bernard Herrmann, who was living in London at the time. He assisted Herrmann with his scoring for Taxi Driver and Obsession (both released in 1976; Herrmann died in December 1975, just after completing the score to Taxi Driver). Through Herrmann, Palmer had met Charles Gerhardt, with whom he collaborated on at least 15 albums. Miklós Rózsa was impressed by Palmer's critiques of his work and invited him to assist with the orchestration of his score for Providence (1977) and all his subsequent films. He then met Elmer Bernstein, who used Palmer's assistance in scoring Heavy Metal (1981). This led to further orchestration work with film composers such as Maurice Jarre (A Passage to India (1984), Mad Max Beyond Thunderdome (1985), and Stanley Myers (The Witches (1990).

He collaborated with Sergei Prokofiev's son Oleg on the publication of Sergei Prokofiev, Soviet Diary, 1927 and Other Writings (Faber and Faber, 1991). His planned biography of Prokofiev was left unfinished. Prone to overwork himself, one of the last things Palmer said to Ray Sumby, his literary editor, was "Ray, don't take on too much." He died of an AIDS-related disease in St Bartholomew's Hospital London at the age of 48.

== Arrangements and orchestrations ==
Christopher Palmer's arrangements and orchestrations included:

- For the memorial service for Laurence Olivier in October 1989, Palmer created a version of Sir William Walton's march Crown Imperial for solo organ, brass, timpani and percussion (with harp ad lib). He arranged Walton's score for Henry V (1944), under the title Henry V: A Shakespeare Scenario; a recording was released in 1990, with Christopher Plummer reading the speeches. Palmer also extracted a Symphonic Suite from Walton's opera Troilus and Cressida in 1987.
- He arranged Sergei Prokofiev's music to the film Ivan the Terrible into a concert scenario (1990).
- He made a concert suite from the music to The Bridge on the River Kwai (1957) by Malcolm Arnold, including "The River Kwai March". He arranged an item from Arnold's score for the film You Know What Sailors Are (1954) as "Scherzetto for clarinet and orchestra".
- He also arranged Arnold's music for the 1954 film The Belles of St. Trinian's as a concert suite for piano four hands and orchestra.
- He arranged music from Ralph Vaughan Williams' The Pilgrim's Progress as A Bunyan Sequence. A recording featured Sir John Gielgud as narrator.
- He arranged Ernest Bloch's From Jewish Life for cello, strings and harp (it was originally set for cello and piano).
- The Holy Boy by John Ireland (originally for piano, 1913), for solo cello and strings (1993) and for solo voice, choir and string orchestra (1993).

== Record producer ==
His activities as a record producer included:

- The world premiere commercial recording in 1992 of Constant Lambert's choral masque Summer's Last Will and Testament.
- A complete recording of Benjamin Britten's last opera, Death in Venice, made for a television film directed by Tony Palmer.

== Writings ==
- Impressionism in Music, Hutchinson University Library (1973)
- Ravel, Novello Short Biographies (1974)
- The Music of Charles Camilleri, an introduction, Midsea Publications (1975)
- Miklós Rózsa. A Sketch of His Life And Work (1975) with a foreword by Eugene Ormandy
- Bliss, Novello Short Biographies (1976)
- Delius: Portrait of a Cosmopolitan, Duckworth (1976)
- Herbert Howells: A Study, Novello (1978), also published in French
- Szymanowski, BBC Music Guide (1983), also published in French
- The Britten Companion, ed. Palmer (1984)
- George Dyson: a Centenary Appreciation (1984)
- Dimitri Tiomkin: A Portrait, T.E. Books (1984)
- Spring Returning: a selection from the works of James Farrar, selected and introduced by Palmer, Autolycus (1986)
- The Collected Arthur Machen, ed. Palmer, Duckworth (1988)
- Dyson's Delight (1989), ed. Palmer, a selection of Dyson's uncollected articles and talks on music
- The Composer in Hollywood, Marion Boyars Publishers (1990)
- Sergei Prokofiev: Soviet Diary 1927 and Other Writings, ed. Palmer with Oleg Prokofiev (1991)
- George Dyson: Man and Music, Thames Publishing (1996)

Palmer edited Miklós Rózsa's memoir, Double Life (1982), which he organized from the composer's dictated recollections. He selected the material and wrote an introduction for The Collected Arthur Machen in 1988, and persuaded his publishers Duckworth to publish Machen's Collected Works in the 1980s. He also wrote a chapter on Nikolai Tcherepnin for The New Grove Dictionary of Opera (1992) edited by Stanley Sadie. Palmer's work on a new biography of Sergei Prokofiev was cut short by his death and his papers on this project are stored at the Serge Prokofiev Archive.

In addition, Palmer wrote hundreds of record reviews, program notes, radio scripts, lecture scripts, and record sleeve notes. Christopher Palmer was twice nominated for the Grammy Award for Best Album Notes:

- In 1975 for Herrmann: Citizen Kane performed by Charles Gerhardt conducting the National Philharmonic Orchestra.
- In 1976 for Korngold: Die tote Stadt performed by Erich Leinsdorf conducting the Munich Radio Orchestra with solos by René Kollo, Carol Neblett, Hermann Prey and Benjamin Luxon.

== Film music ==
Christopher Palmer composed the original music for Miloš Forman's film Valmont (1989).

He worked as an orchestrator or arranger on such films as Obsession (1976), Zulu Dawn (1979), A Passage to India (1984), Spies Like Us (1985), Legal Eagles (1986), Scenes from the Class Struggle in Beverly Hills (1989), Shirley Valentine (1989) and The Witches (1990).

He was the Musical Assistant/Associate on films such as The French Lieutenant's Woman (1981) and Mad Max Beyond Thunderdome (1985), Music Co-Producer on Greystoke: The Legend of Tarzan, Lord of the Apes (1984), and Music Consultant on Cape Fear (1991).
