= Matthew Farrer =

British lawyer (1929–2023)

Sir Charles Matthew Farrer, GCVO (3 December 1929 – 21 May 2023) was private solicitor to Queen Elizabeth II from 1965 to 1994. He was a senior partner with Farrer & Co. He was the son of Sir Leslie Farrer and the Honourable Lady Farrer.

Farrer was educated at Bryanston School and Balliol College, Oxford. He was appointed Commander in 1973, Knight Commander in 1983, and Knight Grand Cross in December 1994 of the Royal Victorian Order.

He advised Elizabeth II in 1993 after she volunteered to pay income tax and capital gains tax and with the transfer of assets which had been the private property of the Queen – but in practice were regarded as Crown property – to the Royal Collections Trust.

Farrer was President of the Selden Society from 2001 to 2003.

Farrer died on 21 May 2023, at the age of 93.
