= Faraar =

Faraar (lit. 'absconder') may refer to the following:

- Faraar (1955 film), an Indian Hindi-language film
- Faraar (1965 film), a 1965 Indian Hindi-language film
- Faraar (1975 film), an Indian Hindi-language crime film drama
- Faraar (2015 film), an Indian Punjabi-language film
- Faraar (TV series), a 2024 Pakistani series

== See also ==
- Farrar (disambiguation)
