= Joan Ferrier =

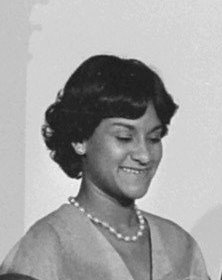
- Ferrier (1977)
- Born: Joan Mary Ferrier; 14 December 1953; Paramaribo, Suriname
- Died: 8 March 2014 (aged 60); Oegstgeest, Netherlands
- Occupations: Ortho pedagogue, teacher

Joan Mary Ferrier (14 December 1953 – 8 March 2014) was a Surinamese-Dutch ortho pedagogue. From 1998 until 2012 she was director of E-Quality.

== Biography ==
Ferrier was born as the daughter of Johan Ferrier, the first President of Suriname, and Edmé Vas, a teacher and inaugural First Lady of Suriname. She was the older sister of the politician Kathleen Ferrier, and the younger half-sister of the authors Deryck Ferrier, Cynthia McLeod and Leo Ferrier.

Ferrier studied remedial education at the Utrecht University. Ferrier wanted to return to Suriname, however, the 1980 Surinamese coup d'état prevented her return, and she started to work for the Sociaal Agogisch Centrum of the Burgerweeshuis (orphanage) where she eventually coordinated two shelter homes for Moroccan children. Besides, she was a teacher for transcultural pedagogue and scientific employee at the University of Amsterdam. When four emancipation organisations for women decided to merge in 1997, Ferrier became the director of the new Instituut voor Gender en Etniciteit in 1998, which later was renamed E-Quality, and is nowadays part of Atria.

From May 2012, Ferrier was the owner/director of her own consultancy agency.

Ferrier was a member of the board of Ombudsvrouw Amsterdam, Technika 10, Young Women's Christian Association and the Nationale Commissie voor Internationale Samenwerking en Duurzame Ontwikkeling (NCDO). She also was the initiator and board member of Stichting Johan Ferrier Fund.

In 2011 Ferrier was knighted Order of Orange-Nassau for her contributions to emancipation, and ethnic diversity.
