= Alexander K. Farrar =

American politician (1814–1878)

Alexander King Farrar (c. 1814–1878) was a state senator, lawyer, slaveowner, and secession convention delegate in Mississippi.

Farrar was a prominent and wealthy slave owner with a large plantation near Kingston, Mississippi. He held 238 people as slaves in 1860. He represented Adams County, Mississippi in the Mississippi Senate from 1852 to 1858. He married Ann Mary Dougharty and, after her death in the 1860s, Lue Philps Lesley. He was involved in investigating the murder of a plantation manager.

Elected as a delegate to the state secession convention held in January, 1861, Farrar was an advocate of the pro-Union position. Like many wealthy Mississippi river plantation owners, Farrar feared war would put his lands and holdings of human chattel at risk. During the American Civil War, Farrar was head of the local vigilance committee of white planters who feared a slave revolt. Farrar whipped people suspected of plotting an uprising or coordinating with Union troops, some of whom died from the torture. Farrar and other members of his committee claimed to have hung at least 40 enslaved people during the war, another former slave claimed that Farrar hung 88 enslaved people before Union occupation of the Natchez area brought his "reign of terror" to an end. Farrar faced no consequences for his wartime actions. After the war he was involved in a plan to sell part of his plantation to freedmen.

Louisiana State University has a collection of his papers.
