= Cape Farrar =

Cape in the Kitikmeot Region, Nunavut, Canada

- Cape
- Location of Cape Farrar in Nunavut Location of Cape Farrar in Canada
- Coordinates: 69°19′15″N 94°16′00″W
- Location: Nunavut, Canada

Cape Farrar (French: Cap d'Farrar) is a cape located along the Boothia Peninsula of the Kitikmeot Region near Taloyoak in the Canadian province of Nunavut, approximately 2,900 km (1,800 mi) northwest of Ottawa.

== Geography ==
Sergeant Frederick Sleigh Farrar RCMP (1901–1955)

James Ross Strait and the St. Roch Basin separate the cape and Boothia Peninsula from King William Island to the west. The community of Taloyoak lies about 38 km (24 mi) northeast of the cape.

== Name ==
Cape Farrar is named after Sergeant Frederick Sleigh Farrar of the Royal Canadian Mounted Police (RCMP). Farrar was born at 37 Gresford Avenue, Liverpool, England in 1901, and was a cadet in the Royal Navy when he emigrated to Canada in 1929 and joined the RCMP in that same year. Farrar spent more than ten years on the schooner RCMPV St. Roch. He was among the first to circumnavigate the North American continent, having gone through the Northwest Passage with Inspector Henry Larsen, serving as skipper. Farrar authored a book entailing his journeys entitled Arctic Assignment: The Story of the St. Roch which was published shortly after his death in 1955.
