= Farrar, Tarboro, North Carolina =

Farrar, North Carolina
- Unincorporated community
- Location within North Carolina
- Coordinates: 35°53′44″N 77°32′34″W
- Country: United States
- State: North Carolina
- County: Edgecombe
- Elevation: 66 ft (20 m)
- Time zone: UTC−5 (Eastern (EST))
  - Summer (DST): UTC−4 (CDT)
- GNIS feature ID: 1020223

Farrar is an unincorporated community in Edgecombe County, North Carolina, United States. The town was probably named for Owen Cicero Farrar, a leading member of the local Baptist church and businessman who ran the general store, the Hotel Farrar, and founder of the Tarboro Cotton Factory constructed in 1888 in nearby Tarboro.
