= Farrer Park (disambiguation) =

Farrer Park is a subzone of Rochor planning area in Singapore.

Farrer Park may also refer to the following places in Singapore:

- Farrer Park Field, a sports field in Kallang planning area
- Farrer Park MRT station, on the boundary of Kallang and Rochor planning areas
- Farrer Park Hospital, at 1 Farrer Park Station Road
- Farrer Park United, a former soccer club in Singapore
- Farrer Park Constituency, a former constituency in Singapore
