= Robert Farrier =

English painter

Robert Farrier (1796–1879) was an English artist best known for his paintings.

== Early life ==
Farrier was born in 1796 in Chelsea, London, and lived in that area throughout his life. He was first placed for instruction under an engraver, but subsequently began to earn a living by painting portraits in miniature, and became a student at the Royal Academy.

== Career ==
Farrier first exhibited at the Royal Academy in 1818, sending some miniature portraits, and in 1819 exhibited the first of a series of pictures in a slightly humorous vein, depicting domestic subjects, and especially scenes from schoolboy life. These were popular, and a number of them were engraved. The first which attracted notice was The Schoolboy—"He whistled loud to keep his courage up" (Blair's Grave)— exhibited at the Royal Academy in 1824, and engraved by J. Romney. Romney also engraved Sunday Morning—The Toilet (R.A. 1825), Sunday Evening and The Declaration.

Other pictures by Farrier were engraved by Mrs. W. H. Simmons (The Loiterer), C. Rolls (Hesitation), E. Portbury (Minnie O'Donnell's Toilet), William Ward Jr. (The Mischievous Boy), Thomas Fairland (lithograph, The Village Champion) and William Fairland (lithograph, The Culprit Detected).

In 1825 one of his paintings, The Review, was included in an exhibition at the British Institution, and was declared by one reviewer as the best work in the exhibition.

In 1837 his painting A Philosopher in Search of the Wind, was engraved in stone by Thomas Fairland.

Farrier occasionally travelled, but continued to live in Chelsea, where he died in 1879. One of his pictures, The Parting, was presented after his death to the South Kensington Museum. His sister, Charlotte Farrier, was also an artist: she had a large practice as a miniature-painter and was a frequent exhibitor at the Royal Academy.
