= Mabel Farrer =

British police officer

Mabel Farrer was one of the United Kingdom's first female police officers and Cumbria's first female Special Constable.

== Career ==
After training in London Mabel Farrer became one of the first female police officers in the UK. Her first position was in Gretna where she started work in January 1917. She was paid £2 a week and her uniform was provided. She was later promoted to Sergeant. Part of her time was spent in Carlisle, where she reported to the Chief Constable.

She was employed by the Women's Police Service and went on to become Special Constable for Dumfriesshire, Cumberland and the City of Carlisle making her Cumbria's first female Special Constable.

Her next position was as Police Constable in the Northampton County Borough Police which she gained in December 1918. Farrer was the fourth women to be appointed to the Northampton Police Force, two months after the first two women to do so. Within this role Farrer had Powers of Arrest.
