= Ronald T. Farrar =

American journalist and academic (1935–2020)

- Born: Ronald Truman Farrar; 1935; Fordyce, Arkansas, U.S.
- Died: May 18, 2020 (aged 84)
- Education: University of Arkansas; University of Iowa; University of Missouri
- Occupations: Journalist, academic
- Spouse: Gayle Hope Dennis
- Children: 2

Ronald T. Farrar (1935 – May 18, 2020) was an American journalist and academic. He was the chair of the Journalism Department at Southern Methodist University and University of Mississippi, and he later became the director of the School of Journalism at the University of Kentucky. He retired from academia as the Reynolds-Faunt Professor of Journalism at the University of South Carolina (USC) in 2001. He was the author of several academic books on journalism.

In 2011, he endowed the Ronald T. and Gayla D. Farrar Award for Media in Civil Rights History at USC.

== Early life ==
Ronald T. Farrar was born in 1935 in Fordyce, Arkansas and died on May 18, 2020. He graduated from the University of Arkansas, where he earned a Bachelor of Science degree in business in 1957. He earned a master's degree in journalism from the University of Iowa in 1962, and a PhD in History and Journalism from the University of Missouri in 1965.

== Career ==
Farrar began his career as a journalist in Arkansas, first as a reporter for the Arkansas Democrat in Little Rock, later as the news editor of the Daily Press in Paragould, and as the editor of the Trumann Democrat in Trumann. He also worked for The Daily Iowan.

Farrar joined the Journalism Department at Indiana University Bloomington as an assistant professor in 1964, and later became a tenured associate professor. He was the chair of the Journalism Department at Southern Methodist University from 1970 to 1973.

Farrar served as chair of the journalism department at the University of Mississippi from 1973 to 1977.

Farrar was the director of the School of Journalism at the University of Kentucky from 1977 to 1986. He became the Reynolds-Faunt Professor of Journalism at the University of South Carolina in 1986, and he retired from academia in 2001. In 2011, he endowed the Ronald T. and Gayla D. Farrar Award for Media in Civil Rights History at USC.

== Personal life ==
Farrar was married to Gayle Hope Dennis. They had two children.

== Selected works ==
- Farrar, Ronald T. (1969). Reluctant Servant: The Story of Charles G. Ross. Columbia, Missouri: University of Missouri Press. OCLC 21421.
- Farrar, Ronald T.; Stevens, John D., eds. (1971). Mass Media and the National Experience: Essays in Communications History. New York: Harper & Row. ISBN 9780060419967. OCLC 195543.
- Farrar, Ronald T. (1996). Mass Communication: An Introduction to the Field. Dubuque, Iowa: Brown & Benchmark. ISBN 9780697173836. OCLC 34012610.
- Farrar, Ronald T.; Worthington, J. F. (1998). The Ultimate College Survival Guide. Princeton, New Jersey: Peterson's. ISBN 9780768900101. OCLC 38580225.
- Farrar, Ronald T. (1998). A Creed for My Profession: Walter Williams, Journalist to the World. Columbia, Missouri: University of Missouri Press. OCLC 941405759.
- Farrar, Ronald T. (2014). Powerhouse: The Meek School at Ole Miss. Oxford, Mississippi: Yoknapatawpha Press. ISBN 9780916242770. OCLC 884907432.
