= John Farrar (disambiguation) =

John Farrar (born 1945) is an Australian-born musician.

John Farrar may also refer to:

- John Farrar (scientist) (1779–1853), professor of mathematics and natural philosophy at Harvard
- John Farrar (minister) (1802–1884), British Methodist minister
- John C. Farrar (1896–1974), American editor, writer and publisher
- John Percy Farrar (1857–1929), English soldier and mountaineer
- John Nutting Farrar (1839–1913), American dentist
- John Farrar (burgess) (1632–1685), Virginia planter and burgess
