= Nigel Farrow =

English cricketer

Nigel Farrow (born 24 November 1963) was an English cricketer. He was a right-handed batsman who played for Buckinghamshire. He was born in Cookham.

Farrow, who made many Second XI appearance for Northamptonshire in 1983, and who represented Buckinghamshire in the Minor Counties Championship between 1982 and 1993, made a single List A appearance for the side, during the 1992 NatWest Trophy, against Sussex. From the upper-middle order, he scored a single run.
