= Castle of Faria =

Castle in Gilmonde, Barcelos, Cávado, Portugal

- Castelo de Faria
- Braga, Cávado, Norte in Portugal
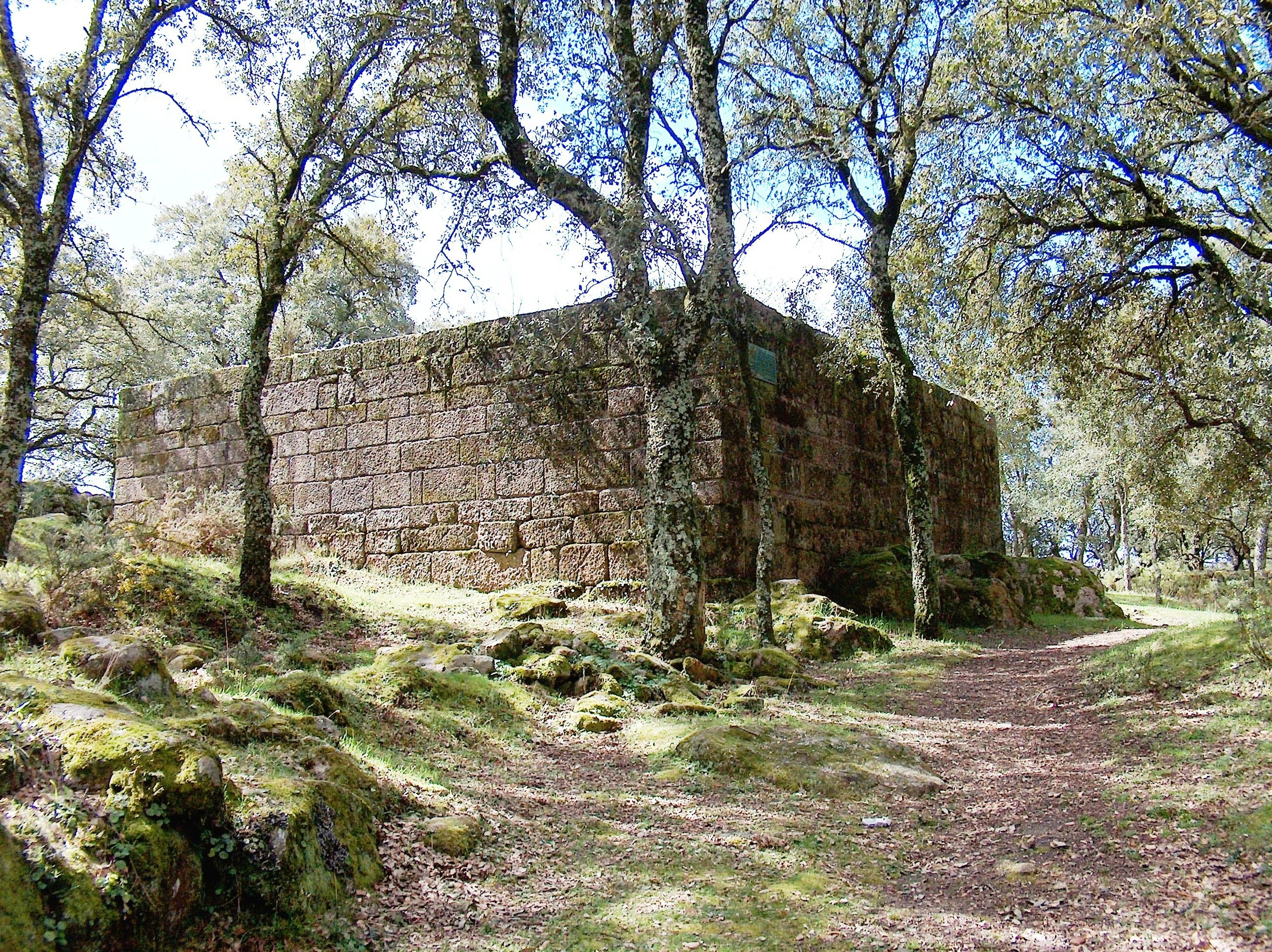
- The stoic remains of the Castle of Faria

Site information
- Type: Castle
- Owner: Portuguese Republic
- Open to the public: Public

Location
- Coordinates: 41°29′47.69″N 8°38′49.51″W

Site history
- Materials: Granite

The Castle of Faria (Portuguese: Castelo de Faria) is a castle in the northern Portuguese civil parish of Gilmonde, municipality of Barcelos, in the Cávado.

== History ==
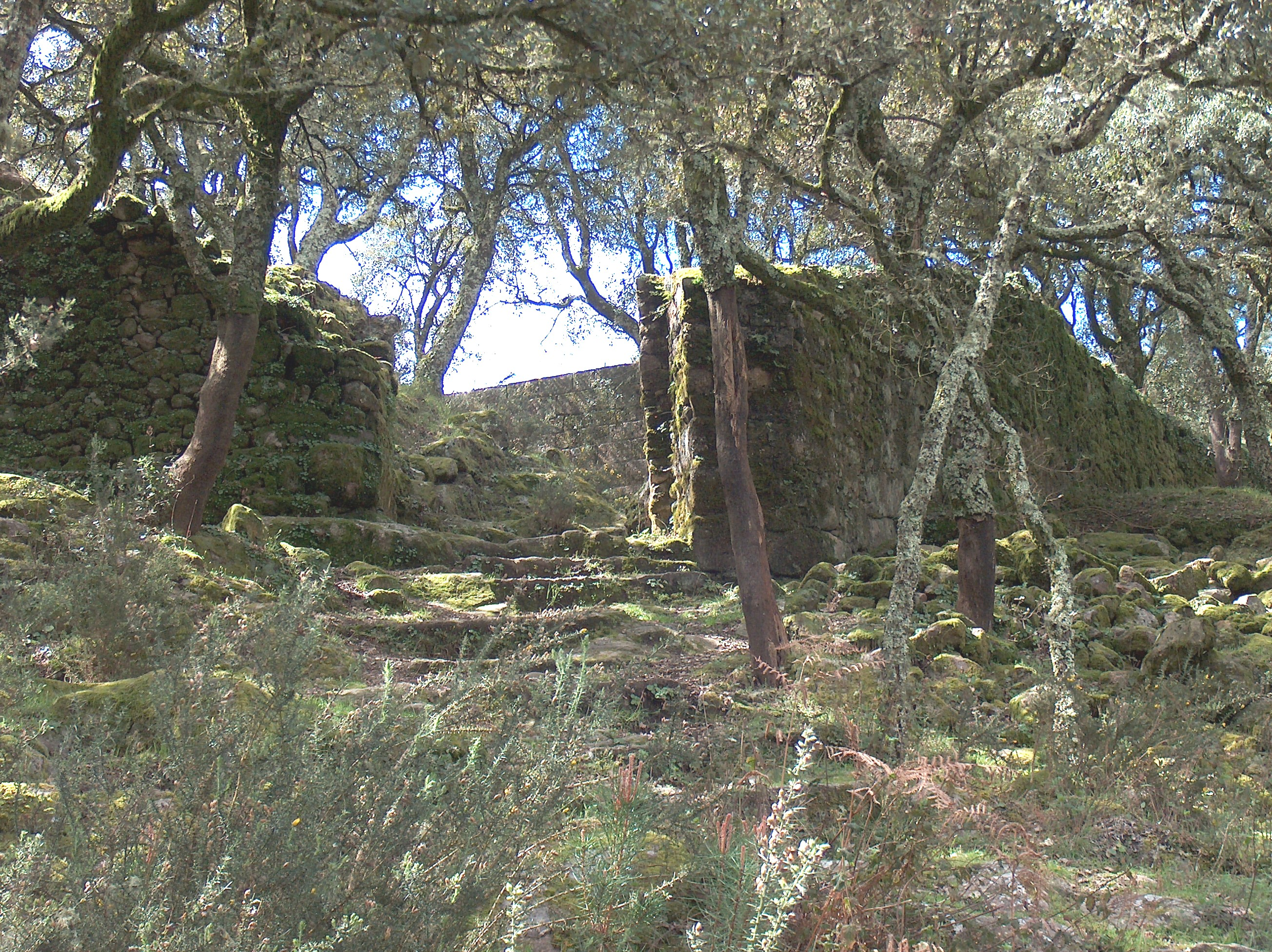
The vestigaes of the buildings and shelters within the walls of Faria

=== Early history ===
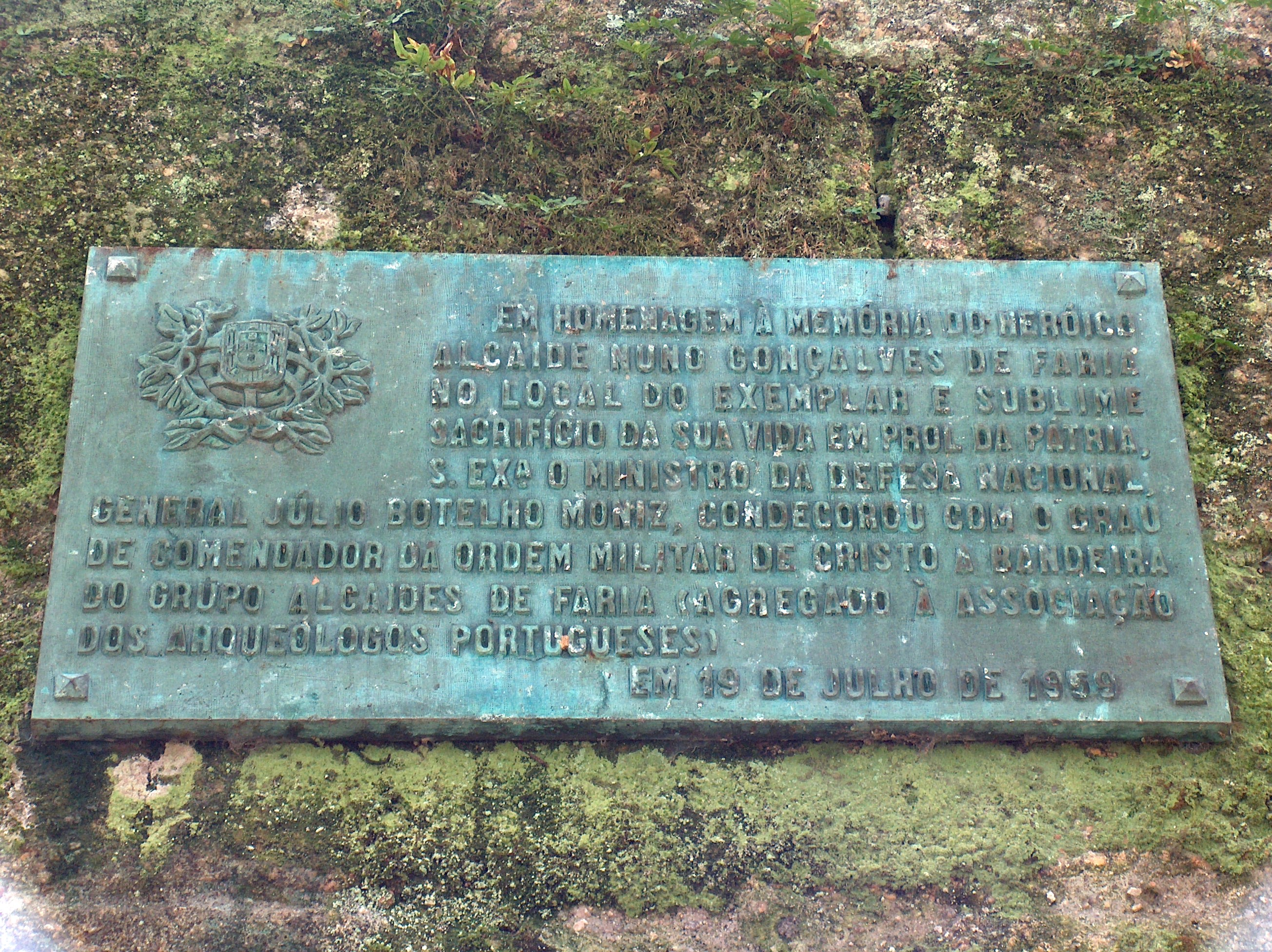
A plaque erected to honour the heroic death of Nuno Gonçalves da Faria

The site has been occupied by a long human presence beginning in the 3rd or 2nd millennium BCE. There are vestiges of the late Bronze Age settlement, that continued until the late Roman era.

In the Middle Ages, buildings at the top of the hill were adapted as a castle for the Terra de Faria, a period of notable bellicose and symbolic importance in the Entre-Douro-e-Minho, during the early Middle Ages. Faria's form corresponds to the 9th-10th-century structure, first referenced in 1099, the year that the fortress was given to Soeiro Mendes da Maia. It is evident from this nobleman's name, the importance of the castle to the foundations of the Portuguese nobility, that dominated the politics of the county of Portucale. This importance was confirmed during the 12th century, from a series of documents and from the prestige of some nobles that were responsible for the fortification, such as Ermígio Riba Douro, Mem de Riba Vizela or Garcia de Sousa.

=== Medieval Era ===
The hilltop of the powerful Terra de Faria, has been associated with a local myth of its role in the revolt of the counts of Portucale against Theresa, Countess of Portugal, who directed the Battle of São Mamede (1128) and ascension to the throne of Afonso Henriques. Before these events, many fortresses swore loyalty to the future King, in opposition to Theresa and her lover Fernando Pérez de Traba. Among these were Neiva (along the north of the Douro) and Santa Maria da Feira (along the southern extension), creating a revolution that was truly "national" in scope. These castles passed from various noblemen's hands in the chronicle of Galician-Portuguese and Spanish-Portuguese conflict; for some time, there were doubts whether the castle referred to as Faria, was not actually Santa Maria da Feira. After studies by Mattoso, Krus and Andrade (1989), the consensual opinion was that the claims by A. de Almeida Fernandes (1991) had never been refuted.

It was, along with the Castle of Neiva, one of the first fortifications to be seized by the Infante Afonso Henriques in his revolt against his mother, Theresa in 1128.

It was site of the 1373 episode between Nuno Gonçalves da Faria and his battles with the Kingdom of Castile. Nuno Gonçalves the alcalde of the castle was imprisoned by the Castilians in 1373, and taken by force to the castle in order to force his son to surrender. But his son would not yield, and his father was killed in front of the castle.

In 1400, King John I donated the castle to D. Gonçalo Telles de Meneses, who ordered the erection of his Fleur-de-lis coat-of-arms (which became the emblem of the Counts of Faria). But, in the 15th century, with rise to the throne of the Avis dynasty, the castle began to decline and slowly lost its importance. Yet, the castle still retains the honor of the most comprehensive treasurer of nationalist artifacts from Middle Ages: belt buckles, helts, and swords, chain-mail and armaments were salvaged from the ruined fortress. Also from the site was a batch of coins from the reign of King Ferdinand, while doubt still plagues the Tomb of Faria, from excavations by Carla Varela Fernandes, in 2001-2002, and Carlos Alberto Ferreira de Almeida (1990), which had been brought from the castle.

During its ruin, in the 16th century, the stones of the castle were used in the construction of the Convent of Bom Jesus do Monte in Franqueira.

=== Republican Era ===
Archaeological excavations were undertaken in 1929, by the group Alcaides de Faria, and then, repeated between 1936 and 1940. The group Alcaides de Faria continue to hold the artifacts excavated during the investigation of the 1930s. Reconstruction of the walls and tower keep began in 1939, that included closing hashes in the structure, cleaning of the cornices, and the removal of materials and debris from the works.

Cleaning projects, oriented by the Campo Arqueológico da Universidade de Braga were initiated in 1978.

Between 1981 and 1985, Brochado de Almeida and Teresa Soeiro, from the Faculty of Letters, at the University of Porto undertook new excavations on the site, in order to realize a comprehensive understanding of the site.

== Architecture ==
The castle is situated in a rural environment, located on a steep and rocky hillside on the northwestern flank of the Monte da Franqueira, covered in dense pines, in a commanding position over the Cávado River.

Faria has three lines of walls that involved the settlement, that clearly identify a castro origin from the Iron Age. The outer wall, towards the east, and before the opening of the road linking Franqueira to the parish of Milhazes, had an extensive trench. Between this wall and the next, interior wall, is, to the east, are remnants of 10 castro-era buildings, some circular and oval, with some including vestibule and fireplace. To the east, on either side of the second wall, are vestiges of circular and rectangular buildings. In the interior of the superior courtyard, is the tower keep of the medieval castle, in a rectangular plan, with the remnants of the walls of the "palace of the alcalde". Between this and the lateral wall, but lower, is a slope that sustain the lands of the upper terrace.
