= Johan Ferrier =

President of Suriname from 1975 to 1980

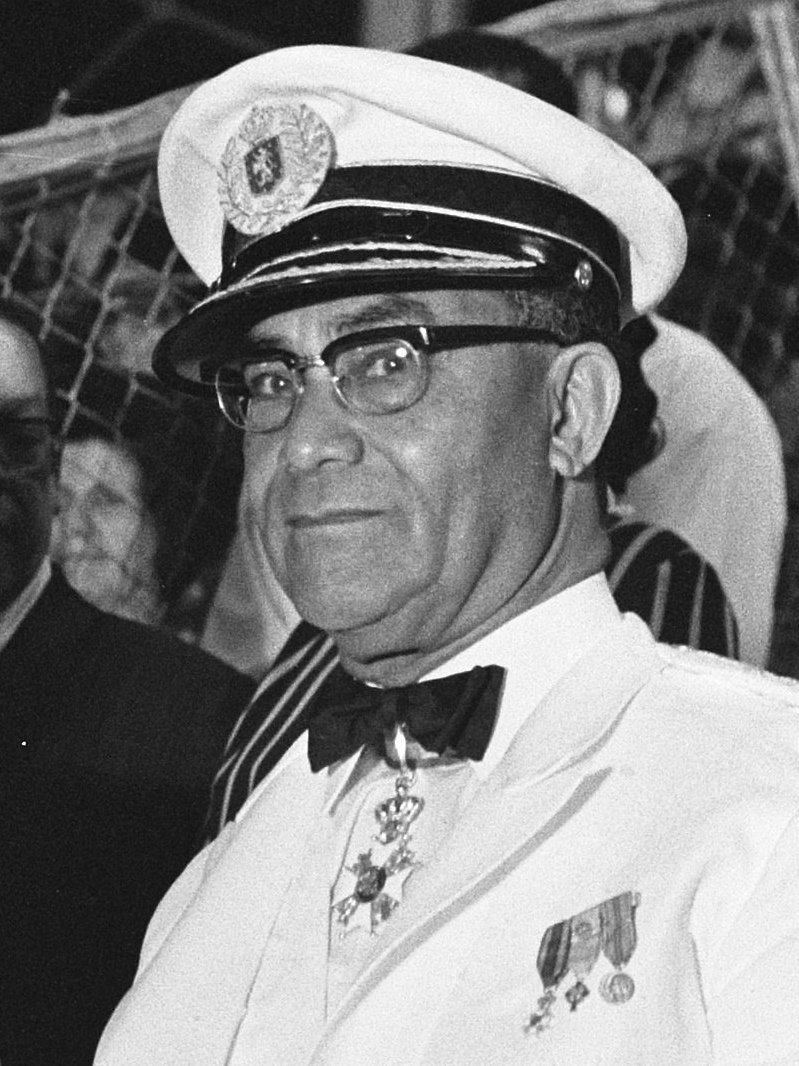
- Ferrier in 1975

1st President of Suriname
- In office 25 November 1975 – 13 August 1980
- Prime Minister: Henck Arron; Henk Chin A Sen
- Leader: Dési Bouterse (Feb–Aug 1980)
- Preceded by: Office established; Juliana (as Queen of Suriname)
- Succeeded by: Henk Chin A Sen

Governor-General of Suriname
- In office 15 March 1968 – 25 November 1975
- Monarch: Juliana
- Prime Minister: Henck Arron
- Preceded by: Henry Lucien de Vries
- Succeeded by: Office abolished

5th Prime Minister of Suriname
- In office 16 April 1955 – 16 July 1958
- Monarch: Juliana
- Governors General: Jan Klaasesz; Jan van Tilburg
- Preceded by: Archibald Currie
- Succeeded by: Severinus Desiré Emanuels

Personal details
- Born: Johan Henri Eliza Ferrier; 12 May 1910 Paramaribo, Colony of Surinam
- Died: 4 January 2010 (aged 99) Oegstgeest, Netherlands
- Party: National
- Spouses: Eugenie Lionarons (died 1959); Edmé Ferrier-Vas (died 1997)
- Children: 8, including Cynthia, Joan and Kathleen
- Education: University of Amsterdam (Dr.)
- Occupation: Politician; teacher

Johan Henri Eliza Ferrier (Dutch pronunciation: [ˈjoːɦɑn fɛrˈjeː]; 12 May 1910 – 4 January 2010) was a Surinamese politician who served as the first president of Suriname from 1975 to 1980. He was also the country's last governor-general before independence, serving from 1968 to 1975, before becoming the first president upon independence from the Kingdom of the Netherlands in 1975 and also served as the fifth prime minister from 1955 to 1958.

He was named the twentieth century's most important politician in Suriname in 1999.

== Early life ==
Ferrier was born in 1910 in Suriname's largest city and capital, Paramaribo. He trained as a teacher. In 1946 he assisted in the establishment of the country's National Party, while Suriname was a colony of the Netherlands.

== Scouting ==
Ferrier was co-founder of the Boy Scouts van Suriname and its first Chief Scout. At age 16 he was a teacher in the Saramacca District and founded his first Scout Group. This group still exists and now bears the name "De Johan Ferrier groep, de groep 2 Oranje Dassers".

== Politics ==
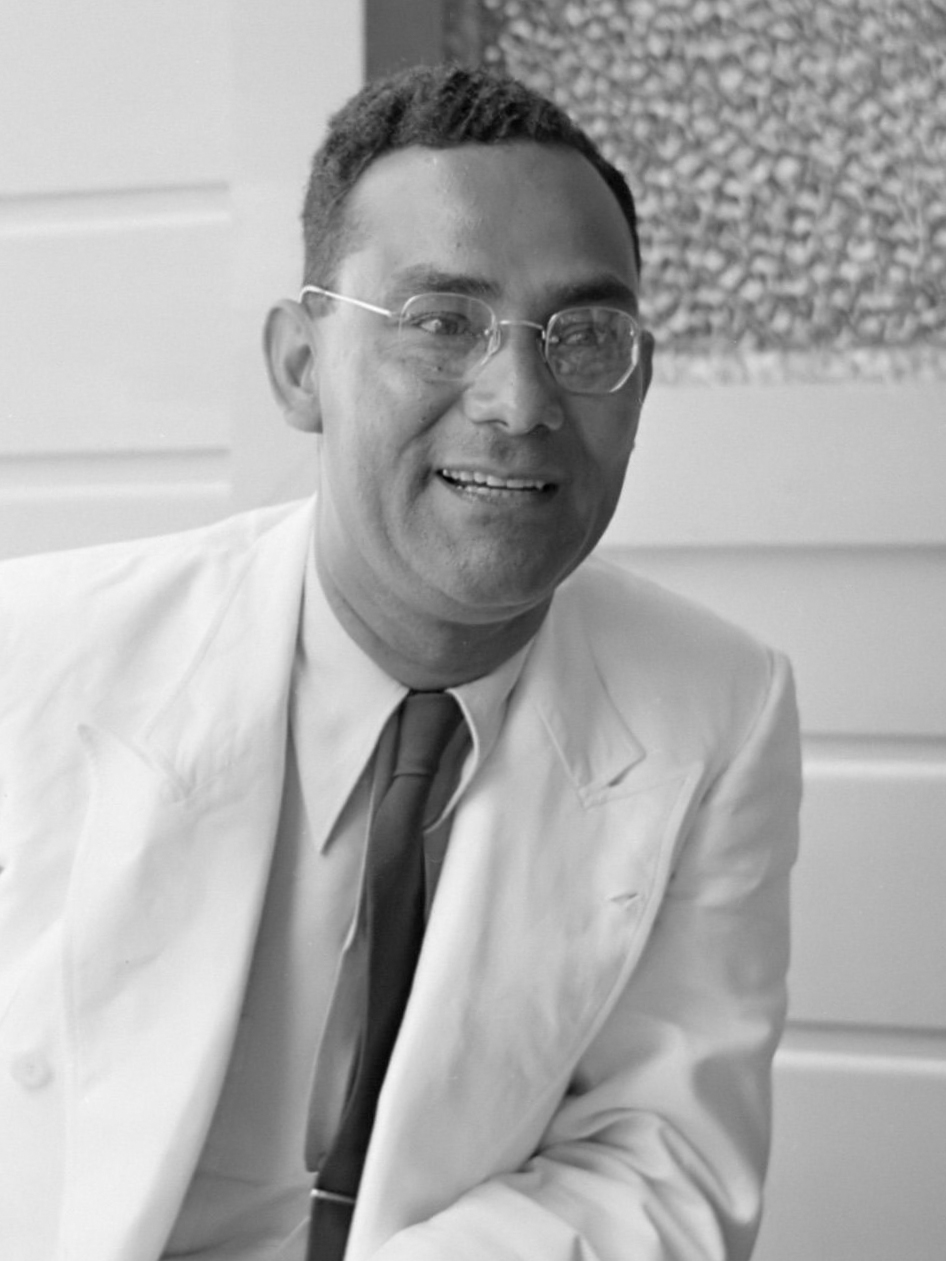
Johan Ferrier (1955)

In 1946, Ferrier was one of the founding members of the National Party of Suriname. Ferrier was a member of the National Council from 1946 until 1948. He then went to Amsterdam in the Netherlands to learn education theory. In 1950, he received his doctorate. When he went back to Suriname, which had by then become an autonomous country within the Kingdom of the Netherlands, he continued to study and to have a career in education. He served as both prime minister and interior minister for a three-year period from 1955 until 1958. He also spent time as Suriname's head of education. From 1968 until 1975 he retained the post of governor. On 25 November 1975, Suriname was made independent, and Ferrier was sworn in as the first president of the country. Dési Bouterse's 1980 coup d'état prompted Ferrier to resign within six months.

Prime Minister Henk Chin A Sen succeeded Ferrier as president. Ferrier was made a Grand Cordon in the Honorary Order of the Yellow Star by Chin A Sen on 3 September 1980. His wife was also made a Grand Officer in the Honorary Order of the Palm.

== Later life ==
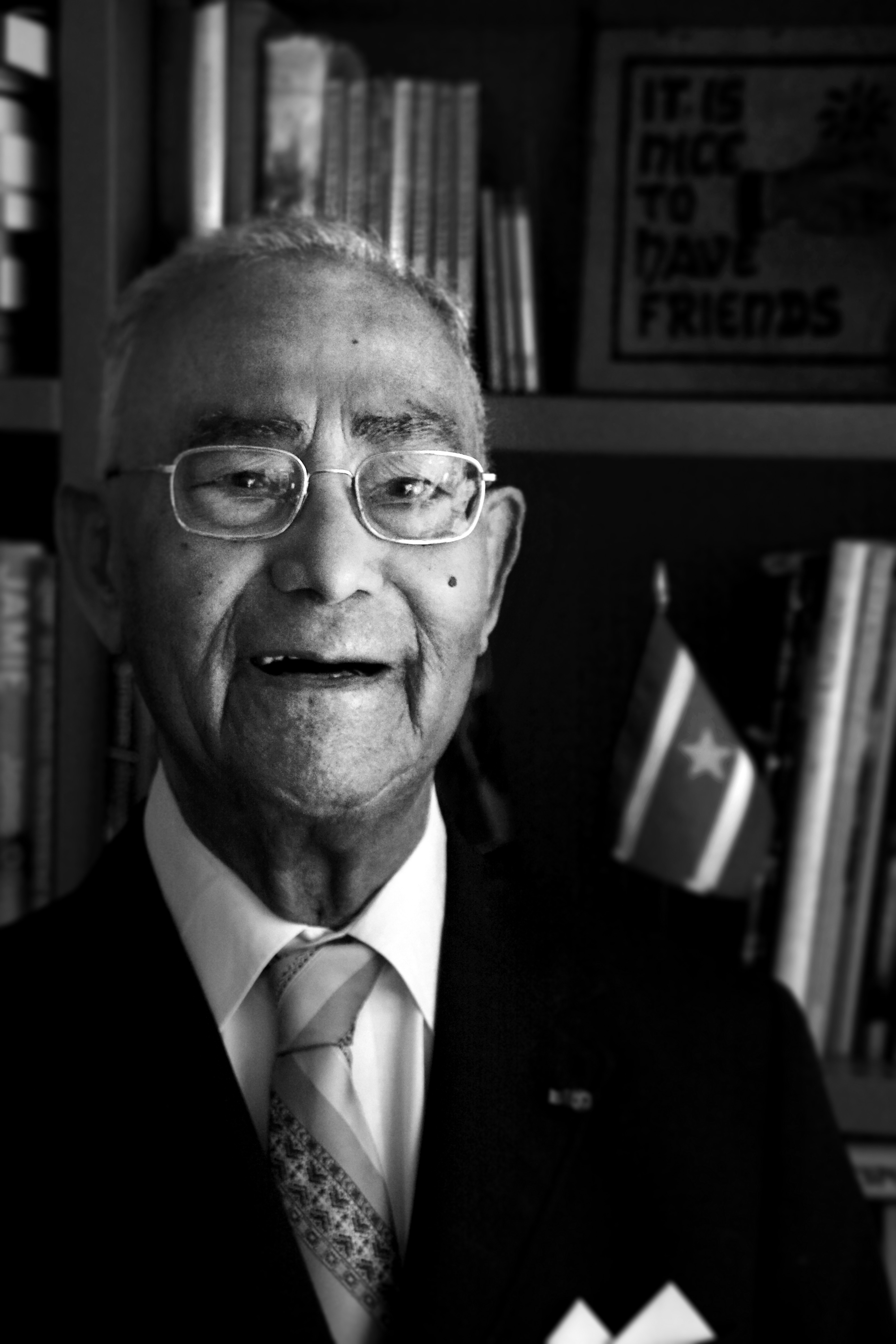
Johan Ferrier (2009)

Ferrier then accompanied his relatives to live in the Netherlands. He lived with them in Oegstgeest. Ferrier used to tell stories about the spider Anansi on Dutch children's television. In 1986, Het Grote Anansi Boek, a picture book was released with illustrations by Noni Lichtveld. The original release was monochrome. In 2010, it was re-released in colour.

His daughter, Kathleen Ferrier, is a former member of the House of Representatives of the Netherlands for the Christian Democratic Appeal. In 2005, Ferrier's memoirs Last Governor, First President: The Century of Johan Ferrier, Surinamese were published. The Dutch Queen gave him a knighthood. An obituary in the national morning daily De Volkskrant said he had claimed: "Even in the darkest days, I kept my optimism".

== Death ==
Ferrier died from heart failure while sleeping at home in Oegstgeest at the age of 99. His body was found in the early morning hours of 4 January 2010.

Queen Beatrix of the Netherlands paid tribute. Prime Minister Jan Peter Balkenende said Ferrier was "an authoritative and wise statesman". Politician and diplomat Jan Pronk paid tribute to his work at uniting divisions.

Ferrier was buried on 11 January 2010, in the Dutch town of Oegstgeest, where he had been living since 1980.

== Johan Ferrier Fund ==
On 12 May 2010, the day Ferrier would have celebrated his 100th birthday, the Johan Ferrier Fund was officially launched. The fund strives to follow in his footsteps in supporting Surinamese projects with educational and cultural goals. The Johan Ferrier Fund is an initiative of his daughter Joan Ferrier, who first presented the fund in the presence of her father in September 2009.

Political offices
Preceded by Office established	President of Suriname; 1975–1989	Succeeded by Henk Chin A Sen
