= Jón Ferrier =

Gulf Keystone Petroleum CEO from 2015–2021

Jón Ferrier was the chief executive officer (CEO) of Gulf Keystone Petroleum until he retired in January 2021.

Ferrier received a BSc in Geology from the University of Wales Aberystwyth in 1979, followed by an MSc in Mineral Exploration from the Royal School of Mines, Imperial College, London in 1983.

Ferrier, formerly with Maersk Oil, was appointed CEO of Gulf Keystone in June 2015. He succeeded John Gerstenlauer as CEO.
