= James Farrar (poet) =

English poet

James Donald Farrar (5 October 1923 – 26 July 1944) was an English poet.

== Biography ==
Farrar was born on 5 October 1923 in London, the second son of Donald Frederic Farrar (1897–1982), a former Royal Flying Corps supply pilot, and Mabel Margaret Farrar, née Hadgraft (1896–1985). He lived in Carshalton, a small village in Surrey, England. He attended the local grammar school, Sutton Grammar School, before working in London. He was the younger brother of the aeronautical engineer David J. Farrar – references to David appear throughout his published writings – and first cousin of Stewart Farrar.

As Farrar had volunteered for the RAF, he was called up in February, 1942 and received his commission as Pilot Officer the following year, serving as a flight navigator of a de Havilland Mosquito with 68 Squadron. On the night of 25–26 July 1944, Flight Lieutenant Frederick John Kemp, with Farrar as navigator, were detailed to intercept a V-1 flying bomb over the Thames Estuary. There was no further contact with their Mosquito aircraft, which was posted as missing. Although Kemp's body was later found, Farrar's body has never been recovered.

== Literary achievements ==
A collection of James Farrar's poetry and prose was published in 1950 by Williams & Norgate in an anthology entitled, "The Unreturning Spring", edited by Henry Williamson. A new edition, with a revised introduction by Henry Williamson, was published by Chatto & Windus in 1968. An abridged version, "Spring Returning" edited by Christopher Palmer, was published in 1986.

Seven poems from "The Unreturning Spring" were set to music in 1965 by Trevor Hold as a song cycle for soprano, baritone and chamber orchestra.

His life has also been documented by Alwyn Trubshaw, Farrar's former English teacher from Sutton Grammar School. Trubshaw has been quoted as saying, "I say taught English, but it would be truer to say I taught English in his presence only. He had no need of my teaching. He was a natural born writer."

More recently, the Autumn of 2008 heralded a resurgence of interest in James Farrar, with a public performance of his writings taking place at The Charles Cryer Theatre, in Surrey; and re-publication of "The Unreturning Spring".
