= Farrar, Texas =

- Unincorporated community
- Location within Texas Location within the United States
- Coordinates: 31°27′25″N 96°16′51″W
- Country: United States
- State: Texas
- County: Limestone
- Elevation: 430 ft (130 m)
- Time zone: UTC-6 (Central (CST))
  - Summer (DST): UTC-5 (CDT)
- Postal code: 74838
- Area code: 254
- GNIS feature ID: 1380852

Farrar is an unincorporated community in Limestone County, in North Central Texas, United States.

== History ==
The area was first settled in the 1850s, but it was only in the 1880s when the settlement of Farrar was finally formed. The community was named in honor of Lochlin Johnson Farrar from DeKalb County, Georgia, who had studied and worked as a lawyer in Atlanta, Georgia before moving to Limestone County in 1859. Starting in 1884 with a population of just twenty-five, the community slowly grew to seventy-five by 1914. In the 1940 census a population of 150 was reported, and in the 1990 census a population of fifty-one was reported.

== Location ==
Farrar is situated in southeastern Limestone County and is located on State Highway 39, approximately eighteen miles south of Mexia.
