= Ferrer (surname) =

Common surname of Catalan

- Pronunciation: English: /ˈfɛrər/ FERR-ər; Eastern Catalan: [fəˈre]
- Language: Catalan

Origin
- Origin: Ferro; Latin: [ˈfɛrroː]
- Meaning: Blacksmith, Ironworker
- Region of origin: Spain

Other names
- Variant forms: Ferro; Ferror/Ferrour; Ferrur; Ferrières; Farrar; Ferrers de Ferrers de Ferrer
- Anglicisation: Ferrer
- Derived: ferrarius [fɛrˈraːrɪ.ʊs]
- Related names: Smith

Ferrer is a common surname in Catalan, ranked 35th in Catalonia and was listed as 1,648th most common surname in the world.

== Origin ==
Ferrer is a surname popular in the Catalan language. Ferrer is an occupational surname for a blacksmith or ironworker as described by The Oxford Dictionary of Family Names in Britain and Ireland- derived from the Latin word ferrum or ferrarius meaning iron, via the Catalan ferro, and thus shares a common occupational derivation with the most common English surname, Smith. It is recorded in almost every country in Europe in the appropriate spelling, hence making it international in origin. It is one of the most common Catalan surnames, ranked 35th in Catalonia. The surname Ferrer is a Spanish variant of the surnames Farrar, which is a variant of the occupational name Ferror/Ferrour, Anglo Norman Ferrur, Ferrier, Ferrers, and de Ferrers. According to Public Profiler, the surname Ferrer came to England from Spain

The English surname Ferrers is originally Norman and unlike Ferrer or Farrar it is a locational name. See for instance, the lineage of the Baron Ferrers of Groby, deriving, in this instance, from the place name Ferrières-Saint-Hilaire, Walchelin de Ferrières (de Ferrers) who arrived in England with William the Conqueror. The Ferrers family held the earldom of Derby and although the main line died out, some descendants in England still bear the name.

The name Ferrer has been identified in the court records of Aragon and by the Holy Office of the Catholic Church of Spain as a Sephardic (Jewish) surname. It would appear that there are at least two branches of the same family in Spain (one Jewish, one Catholic) or two separate families with the same name.

The Ferrer YDNA surname project has only two males surnamed Ferrer and both belong to haplogroup R-M269 ( International Society of Genetic Genealogy (ISOGG) R1b1b2), known as the Western Atlantic Modal and the most common haplogroup in the western Atlantic region of Europe and the British Isles.

One of the two has tested to basal SNP's to subclade R-372, which is a subclade of U106 and has most matches in Scandinavia.

In the Philippines, the first recorded surname of Ferrer dates to 1824, in Pangasinan.

== Analysis ==
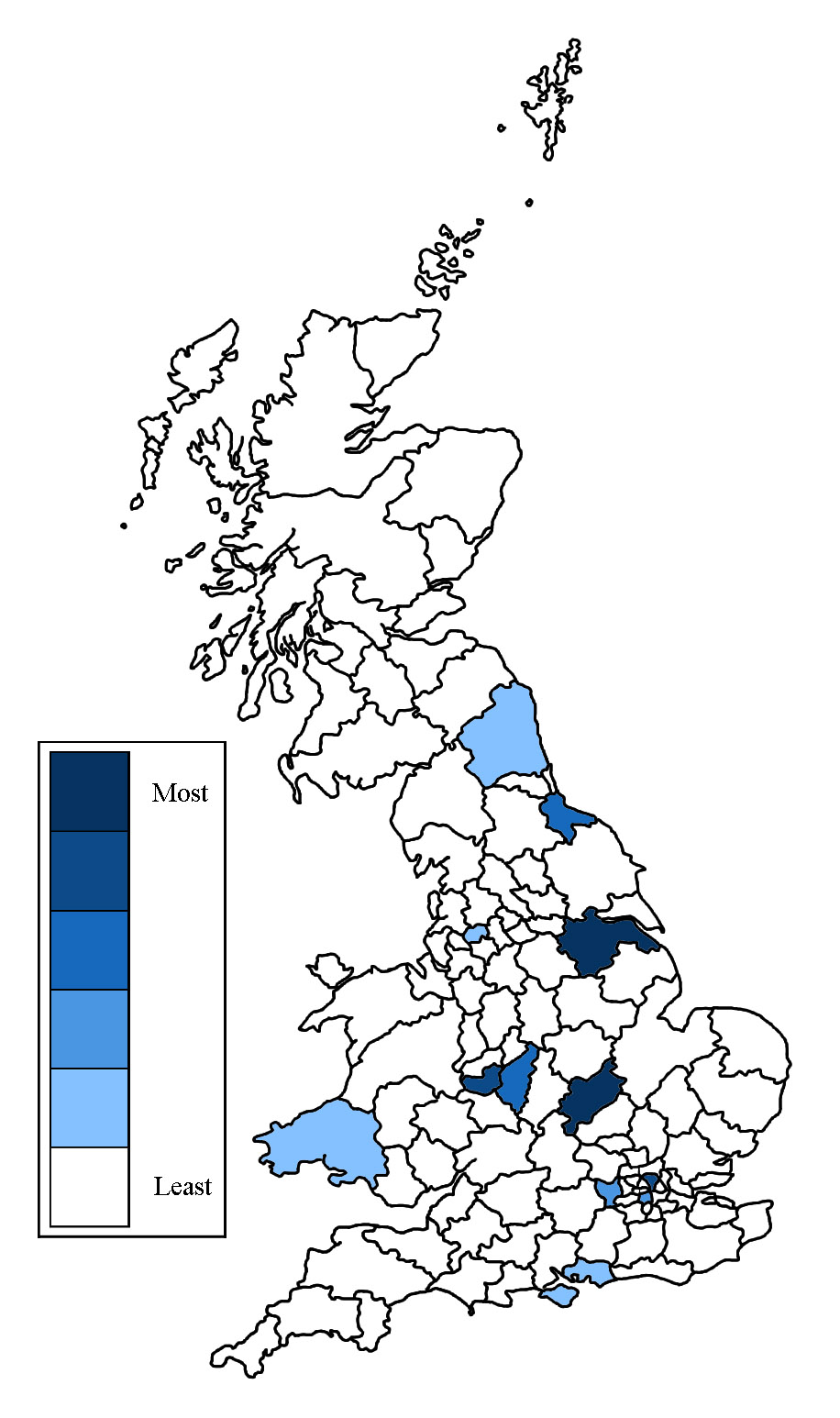
Map of Great Britain showing the distribution of the surname in 1881. The map is divided into postal areas of the United Kingdom.

=== Great Britain ===
Statistically, it is a very uncommon surname in Great Britain. In the 1881 census there are 83 Ferrers recorded, with an average of 3 occurrences per million surnames. Also in 1881, it was ranked as the 19,011th most common surname. In the 1996 electoral register 185 Ferrers were recorded, with an average of 5 occurrences per million surnames, while it was ranked as the 17,724th most common surname. Distribution: in 1881 the Northampton postal area had the highest rate of occurrences of Ferrer per million surnames. By 1998 the highest postal area per million was East Central London.

==== Ethnicity of forenames of people bearing the surname Ferrer in Great Britain ====
Ethnicity of forenames	% of occurrences in Great Britain
British, or Unknown origin	77.87
– English, or Unknown origin	76.28
– Irish	0.79
– Scottish	0.40
– Welsh	0.40
French	1.19
German or Dutch	0.79
Spanish	14.23
Italian	3.95
Black African	0.79
Other Muslim	0.40
Indian	0.40
– Hindi	0.40
East Asian	0.40

Source:Public Profiler World Names website.

==== Comparison between Great Britain and the World (per million occurrences of the surname) ====
International Comparisons	Rate	Rate as %
Great Britain (1998)	5	100
Great Britain (1881)	3	
Australia	19.90	349.8
Canada	24.20	425.4
New Zealand	3.94	69.2
United States of America	42.75	751.4

Source: Public Profiler World Names website.

=== Australia ===
In 2002 Northern Territory was the state or territory with the highest rate of the surname per million people, with a rate of 681% of the Australian average.

=== Catalonia ===
According to IDESCAT, the Institute of Statistics of Catalonia, there were 15,850 persons with Ferrer as a first surname as of 1 January 2007, out of a population of 7,204,000, which means 0.22% of the population. This makes Ferrer the 35th most common surname in Catalonia.

=== New Zealand ===
In 2002 Canterbury was the region with the highest rate of the surname per million people, with a rate of 434% of the national average.

=== Philippines ===
As per the data collected by genealogy portal Forebears in 2014, there are approximately 98,478 Filipinos bearing the surname and Ilocos region has the highest rate of the surname with a frequency of 1:212

=== United States ===
In 1990, Florida was the state with the highest rate of the surname per million people, with a rate of 414% of the national average.
