= Julia Farrer =

British artist

- Born: 1950 (age 75–76); London, England
- Education: Slade School of Art
- Known for: Painter
- Website: www.juliafarrer.com

Julia Farrer (born 1950) is a contemporary British artist known for her abstract, geometrical paintings.

== Biography ==
Farrer was born in London and studied at the Slade School of Art from 1968 to 1972 before teaching there until 1974 when she went to the United States on a Harkness Scholarship for two years. Farrer was based in Paris throughout 1978 and 1979 then returned to London to teach at the Wimbledon School of Art and at the Byam Shaw School of Art.

Farrer produces geometrical abstract paintings and drawings, characterised by the use of distinct lines and pastel shades, that reflect rhythms found in nature. Her work has been included in a number of significant group shows and she has also had a number of solo exhibitions. Group shows that featured her work included the first Nuremberg Drawing Biennial in 1979, the 1988 show Composition/ Structure at the Galerie Lupke in Frankfurt and the Harkness Artists '58-'85 retrospective at the Air Gallery in London. The Air Gallery also hosted a solo exhibition of Farrer's work in 1983 as did Huddersfield City Art Galleries the same year, and the JPL Gallery in 1980. Farrer has also exhibited at Foire International d'Art Contemporain in Paris and has regularly had solo shows at the Francis Graham-Dixon Gallery in London. A number of public collections hold works by Farrer including the Ashmolean Museum, University College, London and the University of Texas at Austin.
