= Jonathan Farrow =

English cricketer (born 1984)

Jonathan Farrow (born 22 February 1984) was an English cricketer. He was a right-handed batsman and a right-arm medium-fast bowler who played for Cheshire. He was born in Stockport.

Farrow made two List A appearances for the side, in the C&G Trophy in August and September 2002. As a tailender, he did not bat in either match, though he bowled five overs in his debut, and ten in his second match.
