= Farrer & Co =

British law firm

Farrer & Co LLP
- Headquarters: 66 Lincoln's Inn Fields, London, United Kingdom
- No. of offices: 1
- No. of lawyers: Approximately 322
- No. of employees: Approximately 600
- Major practice areas: Private wealth; Businesses; Financial services; Not-for-profit; Education
- Key people: Richard Lane (senior partner)
- Revenue: ▲£111.9m
- Date founded: 1701 (via the Tempest Slingers' practice)
- Founder: Tempest Slinger
- Company type: Limited Liability Partnership
- Website: www.farrer.co.uk

Farrer & Co is a British law firm headquartered in London, England serving private individuals, charitable institutions and corporations. The firm operates across five main sectors: private wealth, businesses, financial services, not-for-profit, and education.

They have, over their more than three hundred years of operation, acted for many of the Kings and Queens of England and later Great Britain and the United Kingdom, including Queen Elizabeth II, as well as many leading public figures.

== History ==
The firm was started in 1701 by Tempest Slinger and his nephew, also named Tempest Slinger. In 1759, Oliver Farrer joined the firm, becoming a partner and the sole proprietor by 1769, and the name Farrer was added to the firm's name. From then until 1999, there was always at least one Farrer, and often several, working at the firm.

== Clientele ==
In 1885, the solicitor Frederic Ouvry was headhunted through Coutts. He represented and developed a close friendship with Charles Dickens, and became President of the Law Society in 1871.

The firm established itself as advisors to the Royal Family in the 1930s. Leslie Farrer (later Sir Leslie) was the personal advisor to the Duke of York (later George VI) and was involved in the negotiations over the abdication of Edward VIII (later the Duke of Windsor). The firm continued to serve members of the Royal Family, including Queen Elizabeth II and Prince Charles, throughout the 20th century.

The firm converted to a limited liability partnership (LLP) in 2006.

== Main practice areas ==
Farrer & Co's main practice areas are:

- Banking
- Charities
- Commercial
- Corporate
- Dispute resolution
- Employment
- Family & Divorce
- Financial Services
- Immigration
- Insolvency
- Information & Data
- IP & Technology
- Private Client
- Property
- Reputation Management
- Safeguarding
- Tax
- Trusts, Wills & Estate Disputes

== Recognition ==
Farrer & Co is recognised by independent legal directories, including Chambers & Partners and The Legal 500, for its work across a range of practice areas. The firm was included in The Times Best Law Firms 2025 list, which highlights leading law firms in England and Wales across key practice areas. It was also listed among the Top 75 employers in the 2025 Social Mobility Employer Index, published by the Social Mobility Foundation, which assesses organisations’ efforts to improve socio-economic diversity.

== Controversy ==
The company was used by Rupert Murdoch's News International during the News International phone hacking scandal. Farrer's partner, Ben Beabey, left in 2011 to join News International. In 2012, Julian Pike, then a partner at the firm, told a House of Commons Home Affairs Select Committee that he had advised News International to carry out surveillance of the phone-hacking victims' lawyers, Charlotte Harris and Mark Lewis. News International has since admitted that the surveillance was "deeply inappropriate".

In 2017, Pike was cleared of any wrongdoing by the Solicitors Disciplinary Tribunal.

The firm was named in the Panama Papers.
