= David J. Farrar =

English engineer (1921–2021)

- Born: September 3, 1921; London, England
- Died: April 16, 2021 (aged 99)
- Occupation: Engineer

David J. Farrar (3 September 1921 – 16 April 2021) was an English engineer who led the Bristol team that developed the Bristol Bloodhound surface-to-air missile, which defended Britain's nuclear deterrent for many years and was widely sold abroad. His main achievements in cost engineering were confidential until 2000. He saved two companies from bankruptcy, achieved cost reductions of over £1 million, and trained engineers in cost engineering. His methods are the basis of a major Australian product cost reduction initiative.

== Early life and education ==
Born in London, Farrar was the elder son of Donald Frederic Farrar (1897–1982), a former Royal Flying Corps supply pilot, and Mabel Margaret Farrar, née Hadgraft (1896–1985), and brother of RAF airman and poet James Farrar.

He was educated at Sutton Grammar School for Boys, Surrey, and won three scholarships to study engineering at Gonville and Caius College, Cambridge, going up in 1939. In his second year, Farrar (at the age of 19) passed the Mechanical Sciences tripos First Class with distinction and received a share in University prizes for aerodynamics and structures.

== Career ==
Near World War II, Farrar was expected to go into the Royal Air Force and had been an active member of the University Air Squadron, but he was assigned to the aircraft industry in the Bristol Aeroplane Company, where he specialized initially in structural design. By age 25, he had devised new approaches to the design of compression structures and was in charge of the structural design of Britain's largest landplane, the Bristol Brabazon aircraft.

In 1949, Farrar made in-flight observations of wing buckling in a Bristol Freighter and then did full-power engine cut tests. On the next flight with the chief aerodynamicist and the head of the flight test on board, the full-power engine cut, which caused the fin and rudder to break, and all aboard were lost. The head of the flight test was the designated head of the new Guided Weapons department, to which Farrar then succeeded. Contracts having already been let for army and navy anti-aircraft systems, Bristol and Ferranti were teamed to study a longer-range system for the Royal Air Force. The key to the longer-range system was ramjet propulsion, which required extensive flight development. Despite this, the resulting Bloodhound 1 missile entered service before the other two.

On the formation of the British Aircraft Corporation, Bristol had joined as a junior partner, with all guided weapon work assigned to English Electric, whose guided weapon team had commenced the development of a weapon with second-generation continuous-wave radar (CW) guidance. The Bristol GW team was vulnerable, and two attempts to eliminate it were made. A Bloodhound I missile was rapidly modified to CW guidance and intercepted and destroyed the target aircraft. The other contractors had not reached this stage, so the Bristol Bloodhound II was developed for the Royal Air Force, Sweden, and Switzerland. Its advanced features gave it very long service life.

Many years later, he revealed in an article ("Now it can be told") on the B. A. C. 100 website the secret that the Bristol Aircraft Division was saved from bankruptcy in 1959 by the Swedish Air Force's purchase of the Bloodhound weapon, the profit from which also funded Bristol's joining British Aircraft Corporation and the development of the B.A.C. 111 aircraft.

Farrar was appointed Technical Director of the combined GW Division, but all three Bristol directors who had opposed the elimination of their team had been forced out.

He became engineering director, Concorde, at Bristol. Within a year (before the first prototype was built), he correctly established the causes as a repeated redesign for an unrealistically low takeoff weight and a high aircraft cost. The latter had not been previously predicted and made airline orders unlikely. The French direction rejected design for a more realistic weight, so program slip and cost escalation continued.

When international collaboration commenced on the Space Shuttle design, he became the Director responsible for three British teams designing the payload bay doors, vertical stabilizer, and instrumentation in Rockwell's winning bid for development. In 1973, he left the aircraft industry to become engineering director at Molins Ltd., developing a range of advanced machinery.

In 1979, Farrar became Director of the Centre of Engineering Design at Cranfield University, retiring in 1986. He became vice-president until 2007 of the University of the Third Age at Manningham, Australia, and lectured there on the History of Technology.

In 2013, he proposed a cost reduction program in the Australian manufacturing industry aimed at preventing the loss of manufacturing to foreign low wage competitors. A development has arisen in small companies that, assuming they cannot compete on cost with foreign low wage competitors, decide initially to subcontract 90% of the manufacturing of new products to these competitors.

== Awards and honours ==
He received the O.B.E. for his work on Bloodhound I, and the teams which he led received four Queen's Awards for Enterprise and Queens Awards for exports and technology. He was the first Chairman of the Society of British Aircraft Constructors Guided Weapons Committee, a member of Royal Aeronautical Society Council, served on many professional committees, and in retirement lectured for the Institution of Engineering Designers from whom he received an Honorary Fellowship. In 2014, he became Honorary President of the Bloodhound Missile Preservation Group for the World's First application of control by a digital computer (the Ferranti Argus) in the Bloodhound 2 Launch Control Post.
