= Leslie Farrer =

British solicitor (1900-1984)

Sir Walter Leslie Farrer KCVO
- Born: 30 January 1900
- Died: 6 March 1984 (aged 84)
- Education: Rugby School
- Alma mater: Balliol College, Oxford
- Occupation: Solicitor
- Known for: Private Solicitor to both King George VI and Queen Elizabeth II
- Spouse: Marjorie Laura Pollock
- Children: 1
- Relatives: Sir Matthew Farrer (son); Ernest Pollock, 1st Viscount Hanworth (father-in-law)

Sir Walter Leslie Farrer KCVO (30 January 1900 – 6 March 1984) was a British solicitor. He was Private Solicitor to both King George VI and Queen Elizabeth II. He married Marjorie Laura Pollock, daughter of Ernest Pollock, 1st Viscount Hanworth. They had one son, Sir Matthew Farrer (also a partner at Farrer & Co), and one daughter.

He was educated at Rugby School and Balliol College, Oxford.

He wrote a letter to The Times, about Ernest Gellner.

== Sources ==
- FARRER, Sir (Walter) Leslie’, Who Was Who, A & C Black, 1920–2008; online edn, Oxford University Press, Dec 2007 accessed 22 May 2011
