= Kathleen Ferrier (politician) =

Dutch politician and development aid worker

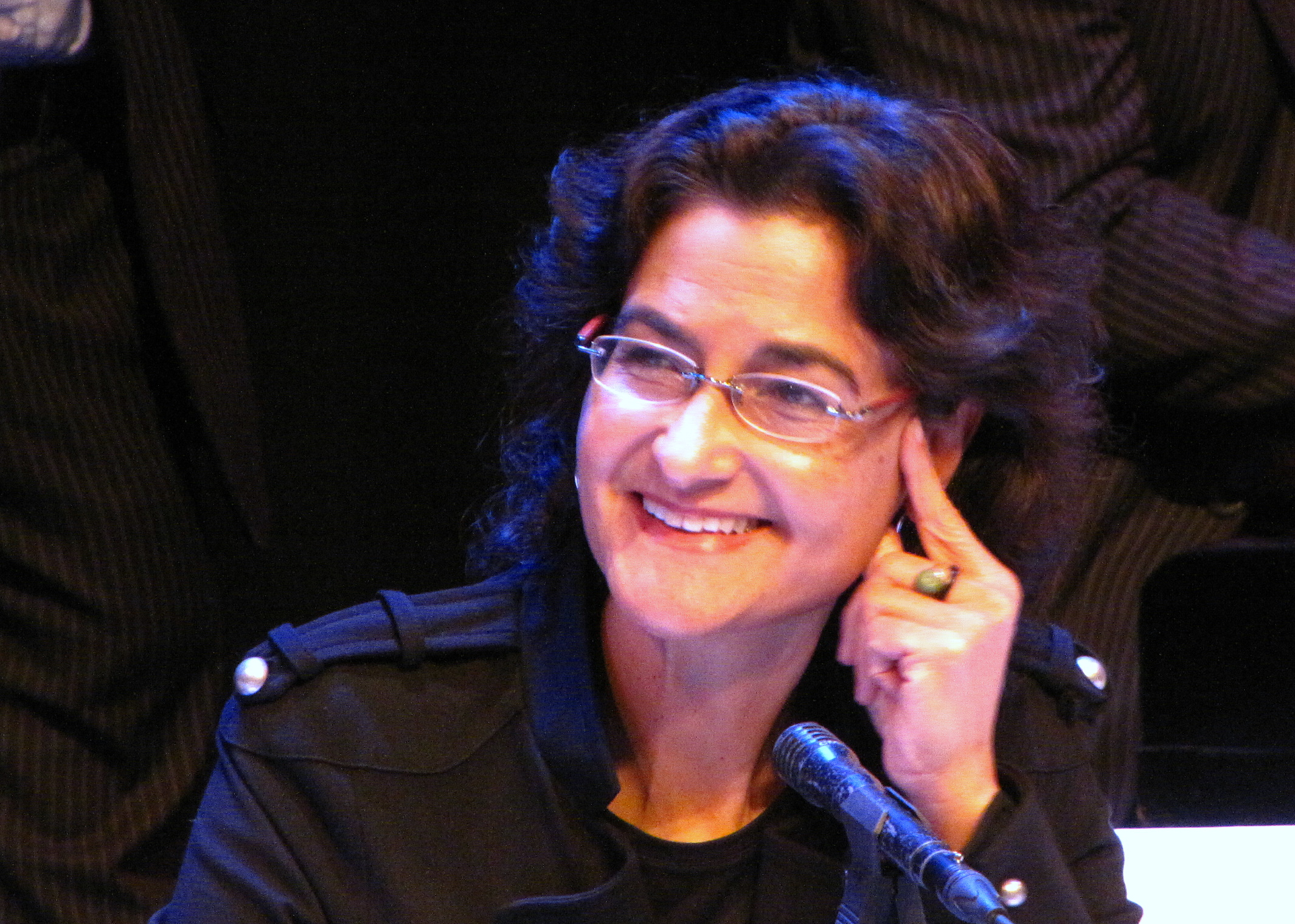

Member of the House of Representatives (Netherlands)
- In office 23 May 2002 – 19 September 2012

Personal details
- Born: Kathleen Gertrud Ferrier; 8 March 1957 (age 69) Paramaribo, Suriname
- Party: Christian Democratic Appeal (Christen-Democratisch Appèl - CDA)
- Spouse: Tjeerd de Boer
- Parent: Johan Ferrier (father)
- Education: M.A. (Spanish language and literature, Portuguese language and Development aid)
- Alma mater: Leiden University
- Occupation: Politician, development aid worker

Kathleen Gertrud Ferrier (born 8 March 1957) is a former Dutch politician of Surinamese descent and development aid worker. She served as a member of parliament of Netherlands representing the party Christian Democratic Appeal (Christen-Democratisch Appèl) from 2002 to 2012.

== Early life and education ==
Ferrier was born in Paramaribo in Suriname when it was a constituent country of the Kingdom of the Netherlands. She is a daughter of the first President of Suriname Johan Ferrier and a half-sister of Surinamese novelist Cynthia McLeod. Ferrier studied Spanish language and Spanish literature (with a specialization in modern Spanish American literature), Portuguese language and also development aid at Leiden University. She completed her masters' thesis on the Cuban poet Nicolás Guillén.

She is a member of the Protestant Church in the Netherlands (PKN).

== Career ==
While Ferrier was an MP from 23 May 2002 to 19 September 2012, for the party Christian Democratic Appeal (Christen-Democratisch Appèl - CDA) She focused on matters of development aid, education, public health, welfare and sports. In 2017, Ferrier joined Asian University for Women (AUW) as an honorary visiting professor.

== Decorations ==
- Knight of the Order of Orange-Nassau (2012).
