= Kenneth Farrow (police officer) =

English police officer (1924–2007)

- Born: 29 May 1924; Sedgefield, County Durham, England, U.K.
- Died: 30 March 2007 (aged 82); Cardiff, Wales, UK
- Occupation: Police officer
- Spouse: Joan Farrow (née Chittenden)
- Parent(s): William and Christina Farrow

Kenneth Farrow GC (29 May 1924 – 30 March 2007) was an English Police officer and recipient of the Albert Medal, one of the highest medals for civilian gallantry in the United Kingdom, which was later exchanged for the George Cross.

== Early life ==
He was born in Sedgefield, County Durham, the only son of William and Christina Farrow. He was educated at Sedgefield Junior School, and attended St Michael's School, Buckingham Palace Road, after he and his family moved to London.

After working as a shop assistant from 1938 to 1942, he joined the RAF in 1942. He served as a rear-gunner on Lancaster bombers with No. 218 Squadron, operating from Suffolk on missions over northwest Europe, and was eventually promoted to Flight Sergeant. It was during his time in the RAF, in 1944, that he met and married his wife, Joan Chittenden.

After his service ended, he joined the Cardiff City Police, later the South Wales Constabulary, in 1947, and it was in this role he was awarded the Albert Medal, which he exchanged in 1972 for the George Cross. He was a road safety officer with the force for several years.

== Albert Medal ==
On patrol on 21 June 1948, at around seven o'clock in the evening, he was alerted by a crowd of people that a four-year-old boy had fallen into the Feeder, an aqueduct supplying water to the Cardiff Docks from the River Taff.

He ran to the uncovered section where the boy had fallen in, removed his uniform and dived into the water, swimming under the covered section for around 180 yards (165 m) in search of the boy. Headroom dropped from two feet (65 centimetres) at the start of the covered point to around six inches (15 centimetres). It was impossible for Farrow to stand upright with his head above water level.

In addition to the pitch black darkness under the covered section, the water was black and heavy deposits sat on the bottom of the aqueduct. Farrow searched the area for fifteen minutes, but thought it was hopeless to venture downstream, and worked his way back to the uncovered section, with the current against him. He was not an excellent swimmer, and fingerholds in the slimy roof were uncommon, located only where slabs fitted together or were damaged.

He was exhausted after reaching the open air. The boy's body was later recovered from the water. He was highly praised for his determination and bravery both by witnesses and the coroner, and was awarded the Albert Medal in October 1948 by King George VI.

== Citation ==
Whitehall, 6 October 1948.

The KING has been pleased to award the Albert Medal to Constable Kenneth Farrow in recognition of his gallantry in the following circumstances: —

On 21 June 1948, Constable Kenneth Farrow of the Cardiff City Police Force attempted to rescue a four-year-old boy from drowning in the Feeder, Pembroke Terrace, Cardiff.

The incident occurred at about 7 p.m. when Constable Farrow was on police patrol duty. He saw a number of persons running, and, on enquiry, was informed that a child had fallen into the Feeder. He at once ran to the place, divested himself of his police clothing, dived into the Feeder and swam underneath a long concrete covering for a distance of about 180 yards in search of the child.

The Feeder is an aqueduct running under concrete slabs and supplying water from the River Taff to Cardiff Docks. It was uncovered at the spot where the child fell in. The speed of the current was about six miles an hour and, whereas headroom at the end of the concrete covering is 2 feet 2 inches (where the accident occurred) it decreases till it is only six inches. The water is black with a considerable amount of mud or silt at the bottom, and it is not possible to stand up in the water with head above water level.

Although the child's body was not recovered till later, Constable Farrow greatly exhausted himself in the search and in the ordeal of making his way back against the current, with very little facility for obtaining a proper handgrip. According to witnesses, he was in the waters of the Feeder and underneath the concrete slabs for about a quarter of an hour, in pitch darkness.

Constable Farrow joined the Cardiff City Police on 7 February 1947. He was then a poor swimmer, but he obtained his Life Saving certificate and medallion a few months later. He is not yet a strong swimmer, but unhesitatingly risked his life under conditions which would have daunted even the strongest swimmer.

Constable Farrow's gallantry was commended by the Coroner and highly praised by the witnesses of his action.

London Gazette, 15 October 1948

== Later life ==
On retirement from the Police in 1972 as Sergeant, he joined the traffic management section of Glamorgan County Council.

In addition to the Albert Medal (and later the George Cross after the Albert Medal was revoked by Royal Warrant in 1972) he received the certificate of the Carnegie Hero Trust and the Police Exemplary Service Medal. During his retirement he lived in Llandaff, and enjoyed fly fishing and gardening. He gave his Albert Medal to the National Museum of Wales.
