= Josef Krips =

Austrian musician (1902–1974)

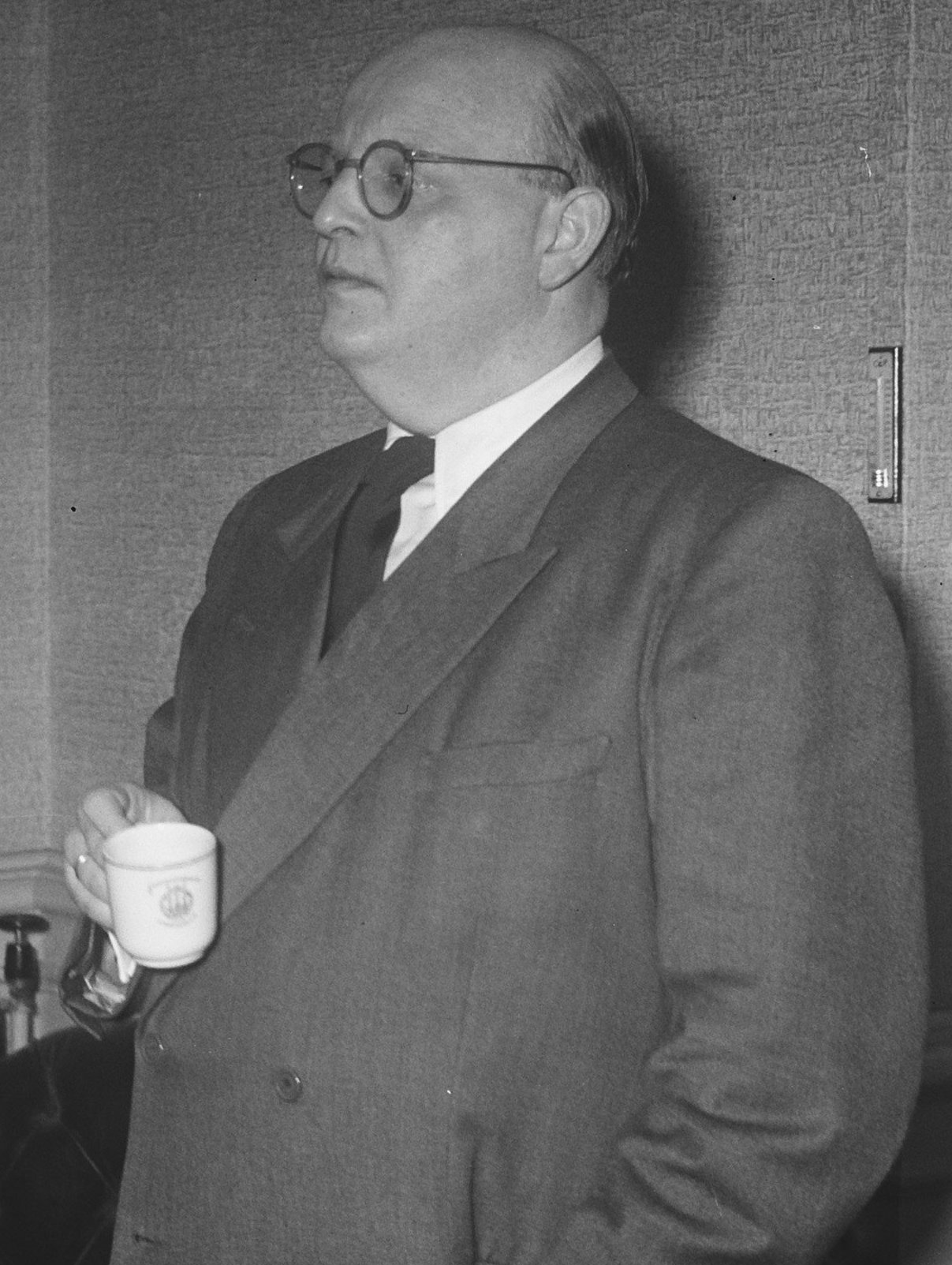
Krips in 1951

Josef Alois Krips (8 April 1902 – 13 October 1974) was an Austrian conductor and violinist.

== Life and career ==
Krips was born in Vienna. His father was Josef Jakob Krips, a medical doctor and amateur singer, and his mother was Aloisia, née Seitz. Krips was one of five sons. Krips went on to become a pupil of Felix Weingartner and Eusebius Mandyczewski. From 1921 to 1924, he served as Weingartner's assistant at the Vienna Volksoper, and also as répétiteur and chorus master. He then conducted several orchestras, including in Karlsruhe from 1926 to 1933. In 1933 he returned to Vienna as a resident conductor of the Volksoper and a regular conductor at the Wiener Staatsoper. He was appointed professor at the Vienna Academy of Fine Arts in 1935, and conducted regularly at the Salzburg Festival between 1935 and 1938.

In 1938, the Nazi annexation of Austria (or Anschluss) forced Krips to leave the country. (He was raised a Roman Catholic, but would have been excluded from musical activity because his father was born Jewish.) Krips moved to Belgrade, where he worked for a year with the Belgrade Opera and Philharmonic, until Yugoslavia also became involved in World War II. For the rest of the war, he worked as an "industrial clerk" in a food factory.

On his return to Austria at the end of the war in 1945 Krips was one of the few conductors allowed to perform, since he had not worked under the Nazi régime. He was the first to conduct the Vienna Philharmonic and the Salzburg Festival in the postwar period. Working with fellow conductors Clemens Krauss and Karl Böhm, Krips helped restore the Vienna State Opera and Vienna Philharmonic to their prewar levels.

From 1950 to 1954, Krips was principal conductor of the London Symphony Orchestra. Afterwards, he led the Buffalo Philharmonic Orchestra from 1954 to 1963. Under Krips' leadership, the orchestra expanded in the length of its performance season and in the number of musicians that the orchestra employed. Krips took the orchestra on tours in eastern United States and Canada, including the Maritime Provinces. For his time with the Buffalo Philharmonic, Krips largely eschewed recent compositions and "concentrated largely in European classical and romantic literature." Later, during his final seasons, Krips began to program "a few contemporary works."

During this period, Krips guest conducted other orchestras. For example, in February 1960 Krips guest conducted the Montreal Symphony Orchestra with a performance of works by Mozart and Brahms. Krips appeared as guest conductor with the New York Philharmonic in the fall of 1964, and the program included works by Brahms, Copland, and Schumann.

Leaving the Buffalo Philharmonic in 1963, Krips served as the music director of the San Francisco Symphony from 1963 to 1970. During his tenure with the San Francisco Symphony, Krips conducted 210 works with the orchestra. Of these works, 91 works were by twentieth century composers. In San Francisco, Krips conducted several world premieres. Krips premiered the First Symphony of Kirke Mechem in 1965. He premiered William Walton's Improvisations on an Impromptu of Benjamin Britten in 1970.

Krips made his Covent Garden debut in 1947 and his Metropolitan Opera in 1966, guest conducting frequently from then on. Krips made his first appearance with the Boston Symphony Orchestra at the 1968 Berkshire Festival. In 1970, he became conductor of the Deutsche Oper in Berlin. Between 1970 and 1973, he was the principal conductor of the Vienna Symphony.

Krips died of lung cancer at the age of 72 in Geneva, Switzerland, 1974.

== Personal life ==
Krips was married three times.

His first wife was Maria Heller, a woman who was widowed and ran a fashion salon in Aussig (a small town, located between Dresden and Prague), where Krips had his first engagement abroad. The wedding took place in Vienna on August 12, 1925. His wife died in a car accident in June 1928.

His second wife was Maria "Mitzi" Wilheim, a singer whom Krips had coached and married in 1947. The two remained together until Wilheim's death on April 8, 1969.

Krips married his third wife on October 9, 1969. The formal wedding announcement identifies her as Harrietta Freiin von Prochazka, the daughter of Dr. Ottokar Freiherr von Prochazka and Maria Freifrau von Prochazka née Dressler. According to Ewen and the New York Times, Krips' third wife was "the former Baroness Marietta von Prohaska." The New York Times noted that von Prohaska was his "29‐year‐old secretary." Other sources list the name of Krips' third wife as "Harrietta Krips." In the Reuters obituary notice for Josef Krips, her name is listed as being "the Baroness Henriette Prochazka." The Boston Symphony Orchestra Archives has a photograph of Krips and his third wife attending a Tanglewood concert, where she is identified as "Baroness Harriet Prochazka." Krips' third wife died on 12 January 2015.

Krips' brother, Henry Krips, emigrated to Australia and was the chief conductor of the South Australian Symphony Orchestra (later known as the Adelaide Symphony Orchestra) for 23 years (1949–1972). Both brothers appeared together as conductors at a 1963 concert of the Queensland Symphony Orchestra.

== Recordings ==
Krips's first recording was made for Odeon Records in Vienna on 13 January 1937, conducting the Orchestra of the Wiener Staatsoper in two Rossini numbers from the Bernhard Paumgartner operetta Rossini in Neapel, sung by Richard Tauber. Krips conducted the Vienna premiere of the work ten days earlier.

In 1947, Krips and the National Symphony Orchestra recorded Strauss's Blue Danube & Emperor waltzes (Decca LW 5011).

In 1950, Krips and the London Symphony Orchestra made a well-received recording of Mozart's Jupiter Symphony (London LPS 86).

In 1955, Krips made a critically acclaimed recording of Mozart's Don Giovanni with the Vienna State Opera featuring Cesare Siepi, Fernando Corena, Walter Berry, Suzanne Danco, Lisa Della Casa and Hilde Gueden.

In 1956, Krips conducted the Symphony of the Air in stereo recordings of the five Beethoven piano concertos with Arthur Rubinstein for RCA Victor. With the RCA Victor Symphony Orchestra Rubinstein and Krips also recorded Brahms Second Piano Concerto in 1958.

During the years 1950–1958, Krips recorded various works by Mozart, Brahms, Dvořák, Schubert, Schumann, Tchaikovsky, Beethoven, Johann Strauss, Richard Strauss, Haydn, and Mendelssohn. These performances included the Vienna Philharmonic, the London Symphony Orchestra, and the Israel Philharmonic.

In January 1960, Krips recorded Beethoven's nine symphonies for Everest Records. For this set of recordings, Krips conducted the London Symphony Orchestra, and for the Symphony No. 9, the soloists included Donald Bell, baritone, Jennifer Vyvyan, soprano, Rudolf Petrak, tenor, and Shirley Carter (later known as Shirley Verrett), mezzo-soprano. The BBC Chorus, under the chorusmaster Leslie Woodgate also performed. This series of recordings was popular with music critics and the public, and the recordings have been reissued several times in authorized and in bootleg editions.

During the 1970s, Krips recorded Mozart's late symphonies for Philips Records, conducting the Concertgebouw Orchestra. These have been reissued over the years by Philips and more recently by Decca.

Krips did not make any commercial recordings with the San Francisco Symphony, although many of his concerts were broadcast in stereo by San Francisco station KKHI.
