= Piano Concerto (Britten) =

Composition by Benjamin Britten

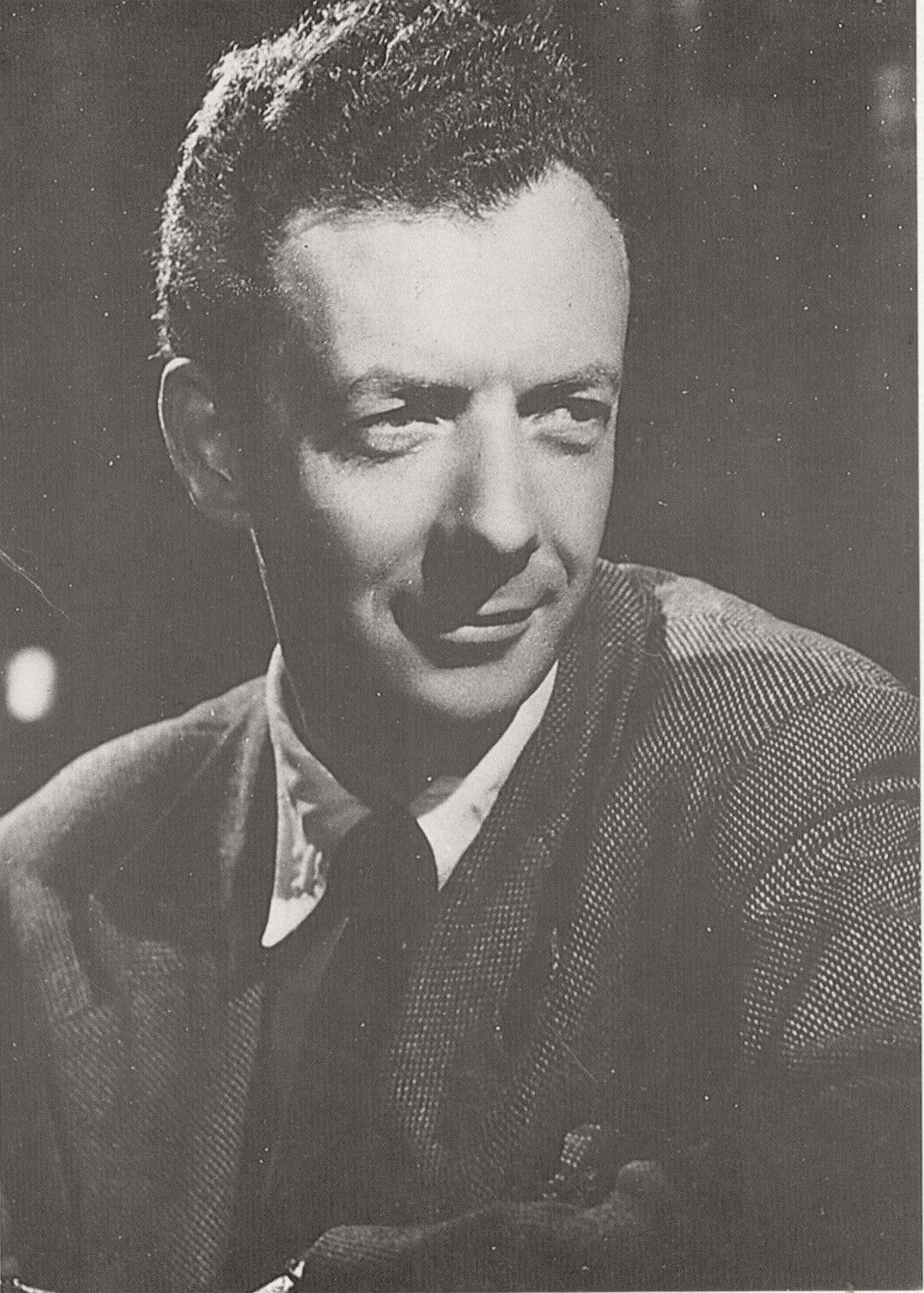
Benjamin Britten in the 1940s

Benjamin Britten's Piano Concerto, Op. 13, is the composer's sole piano concerto.

== History ==
The piece was written in 1938 and then revised in 1945, including the replacement of the third movement. This was Britten's first work for piano and orchestra, which he premiered as the soloist at a Promenade Concert in 1938. Dedicated to the composer Lennox Berkeley, the concerto is a bravura work that has gained more international attention in recent years. Britten described the piece as "simple and in direct form".

The revised version premiered at the Cheltenham Festival on July 2, 1946. The London premiere was performed soon after at the Proms in Royal Albert Hall with Noel Mewton-Wood as the soloist performing with the London Symphony Orchestra conducted by Basil Cameron. With Britten's agreement, a theme from the revised version was used by his colleague William Walton as the basis of a 1969 orchestral work, Improvisations on an Impromptu of Benjamin Britten.

The best-known recording of the concerto is by the English Chamber Orchestra with Sviatoslav Richter as the soloist and Britten conducting, from a 1970 performance at the Snape Maltings, Aldeburgh, near Britten's own home.

Boosey & Hawkes published the score of the concerto and estimated that it is 33 minutes in length.

== Music ==
The work is scored for 2 flutes (both doubling piccolo), 2 oboes (2nd doubling English horn), 2 clarinets, 2 bassoons, 4 horns, 2 trumpets, 3 trombones, 1 tuba, percussion (timpani, glockenspiel, cymbals, whip, bass drum, snare drum, tambourine, and tenor drum), harp, and strings.

The concerto is in four movements:

1. Toccata: Allegro molto e con brio (4/4)
2. Waltz: Allegretto (3/4)
3. Impromptu: Andante lento (2/4)
4. March: Allegro moderato sempre a la marcia (4/4)

The first movement is the most typically 'bravura' movement of the concerto. Much of the melody is derived from a sequence introduced in the opening bars. As in the rest of the piece, the orchestra plays a major role. There is a significant cadenza, written with no clear time signature and only approximate bar lines, where glissandos are a key feature. A lyrical melody opens up, before rapidly building to a dramatic end.

Originally the third movement was a 'Recitative and Aria'. There is another section marked 'quasi cadenza', again written with ambiguous bar markings.

Dotted rhythms and crushed notes are an important feature of the final movement, and a whip-crack is heard throughout, as is musical quotation of the first movement. The music is much denser than the other movements.

A typical performance lasts around 35 minutes.

== Selected recordings ==
The pianist Sviatoslav Richter, a friend of Britten's, recorded the work with Britten conducting the English Chamber Orchestra. Steven Osborne has recorded the work with Illan Volkov and the BBC Scottish Symphony Orchestra, and the concerto has been performed several times at the BBC Proms by the pianist Leif Ove Andsnes. Andsnes also recorded the concerto in 1999 for EMI with the City of Birmingham Symphony Orchestra and conductor Paavo Järvi.
