= The Quest (ballet) =

Ballet score by William Walton

The Quest is a ballet score by William Walton, written for a ballet of the same title, now lost, choreographed by Frederick Ashton in 1943. Two versions of the score exist: one for the small orchestra for which Walton wrote (because of wartime constraints), and a posthumously constructed version rescored for an orchestra of the larger size usually favoured by the composer. The ballet, with a scenario by Doris Langley Moore, was based on The Faerie Queene by Edmund Spenser. It was first given by the Sadler's Wells Ballet company.

== Background and first performances ==
By the 1940s Walton was an established composer, known for works including a symphony, three concertos, the cantata Belshazzar's Feast and the "entertainment" Façade. From the last, he had fashioned two orchestral suites, which the choreographer Frederick Ashton used for his 1931 ballet Façade. During the Second World War Walton worked with the Army Film Unit and Ashton was in the Royal Air Force. Kenneth Clark, an influential figure in the arts world, secured Ashton six weeks' leave of absence from the Air Ministry to create a new ballet for the Sadler's Wells company. By 1943 the company was performing mostly away from London, taking ballet round the country, with its dancers, orchestra and backstage staff heavily depleted by wartime conscription.

Ashton chose to create what he later called "a piece of wartime propaganda", depicting the triumph of good over evil. He chose a story from The Faerie Queene by the Elizabethan poet Edmund Spenser, and quickly chose his collaborators to get the piece created and staged within six weeks. The scenario was by his friend Doris Langley Moore, the costumes and scenery by John Piper and the music by Walton.

Robert Helpmann played the hero, Saint George, opposite Margot Fonteyn as Una, the personification of Truth. Her alter ago, played by Beryl Grey, was Duessa, "the scarlet whore", embodying Falsehood. The Seven Deadly Sins led by Pride appear in Scene 3 and holiness returns in the fifth and final scene with Faith, Hope and Charity. Walton's music, composed in great haste, followed the scenario carefully, though without great enthusiasm on his part. A slow and painstaking writer as a rule, he called on Roy Douglas and Ernest Irving to help with the orchestration. He wrote of The Quest in 1957:

Not much to be said for it ... The subject, not very inspiring, had been concocted from Spenser's Faerie Queene by some woman or other whose name I cannot remember, but it was a difficult scenario. The music was composed under adverse conditions and was written more or less as one writes for the films, first come first served! So some of the ideas were not too bad and some better not mentioned but as it had to be done quickly as Freddy only had limited leave, it had to be done that way – 45 mins' music in less than 5 weeks. It was not much of a success from anyone's point of view.

The ballet was premiered on 7 April 1943 at the New Theatre in London and then taken out on tour. It was well received at the premiere, and, despite the composer's reservations, was a success, being given 93 performances over the next two years. The ballet historian Geraldine Morris suggests that the work fell out of favour after the war because of its wartime "propagandist, patriotic elements". One critic wrote in 1943 that The Quest should be seen by everyone, "for as the curtain falls one is tempted to cry with Shakespeare: 'God for Harry, England and St George'". After 1945 the work dropped out of the repertoire and Ashton's choreography is now lost.

== Music ==
=== Score ===
The ballet music takes about 40 minutes in performance. The performing edition of the score published by the Oxford University Press and edited by John Eric Floreen and Christopher Palmer is scored for three flutes (two doubling piccolos), two oboes (one doubling cor anglais), two clarinets, two bassoons, four horns, three trumpets, three trombones, one tuba, two harps, and percussion comprising timpani, glockenspiel, xylophone, tam-tam, cymbals and suspended cymbal, bass drum, side drum, snare drum, tambourine, castanets, triangle, wood block, temple blocks, whip, tubular bells, sleigh bells, and piano, celeste and strings.

Walton's score follows the five-scene plot of the ballet.

- Scene I

Outside the House of Archimago, St George and Una are lost in a storm and fall under the spell of Archimago, who transforms his female servant into an evil alter ego of Una. Spirits flutter menacingly about. St George is duped into thinking Una has been seduced by Archimago's servant, and he leaves in horror.

- Scene 2

Near the Palace of Pride, three knights Sansloy (Lawless), Sansjoy (Joyless) and Sansfoy (Faithless) dance to compete for the hand of Duessa (Falsehood). St George enters and kills Sansfoy in fight. He leaves with Duessa. Una enters, still searching for St George, then falls asleep. Archimago enters disguised as St George, wakes Una and leaves with her.

- Scene 3

In the Palace of Pride the Seven Deadly sins display themselves: first Sloth and then Gluttony, Wrath, Lechery, Avarice, Envy and finally Pride (as Queen). St George enters with Duessa. Sansjoy follows him and they fight. Duessa takes Sansjoy's side and is horrified when he is killed. St George, disillusioned, sees the Palace of Pride and Duessa for what they are, and to a dissonant climax he leaves the scene.

- Scene 4

Near the Palace of Pride Sansloy is mourning his two brothers. Archimago enters, still disguised as St George, and Sansloy kills him. St George enters, kills Sansloy and is reunited with Una.

- Scene 5

St George brings Una to the House of Holiness. After pledging himself to England he bids farewell to his beloved and departs on his quest, to climactic music.

Walton's biographer Michael Kennedy writes of the music of The Quest:

If not top-class Walton, the score breathes the atmosphere of the theatre with an ease that augured well for an opera. Incidentally, the suite opens with the direction "allegro malizioso", the malice this time not being directed at a lover who had discarded him but at the magician in the ballet who had laid a spell on St George. There is a lightly scored and lilting siciliana, a long flute solo which has characteristic Waltonian wry charm.

=== Versions ===
The score was lost for several years after the war, but the music scholar and critic John Warrack tracked it down to a London warehouse. With Walton's approval the conductor Vilém Tauský extracted a four-movement suite from the score, which Tauský premiered at the Royal Festival Hall in June 1961. Walton recorded the suite with the London Symphony Orchestra in 1970. For this suite, about 13 minutes in length, Tauský − with Walton's approval − added extra instruments in the orchestral parts, bringing the originally small orchestra up to more Waltonian proportions.

In the late 1980s, the musical scholar Christopher Palmer reconstructed the five-movement ballet score, further amplifying the original sparer orchestration. This version was recorded by the London Philharmonic Orchestra conducted by Bryden Thomson. Ten years later the conductor David Lloyd-Jones edited the original score for a new recording, restoring some passages cut by Walton (and Palmer), and largely reverting to the smaller orchestral forces of the 1943 score.

== 1972 ballet ==
In 1972 the choreographer Joe Layton used Walton's music for a ballet about Oscar Wilde, O.W., given by the Royal Ballet at Sadler's Wells Theatre, London. The prologue of the ballet was danced to music from The Quest. (For the main section, Walton's Viola Concerto was used.)

== References and sources ==
=== Sources ===
- Kennedy, Michael (1989). Portrait of Walton. Oxford: Oxford University Press. ISBN 978-0-19-816705-1.
- Morris, Geraldine (Winter 2008). "Visionary Dances: Ashton's Ballets of the Second World War". Dance Research: The Journal of the Society for Dance Research. 26 (2): 168–188. doi:10.3366/E0264287508000170. JSTOR 40263998. S2CID 191495080. (subscription required)
