= Improvisations on an Impromptu of Benjamin Britten =

Orchestral piece by William Walton

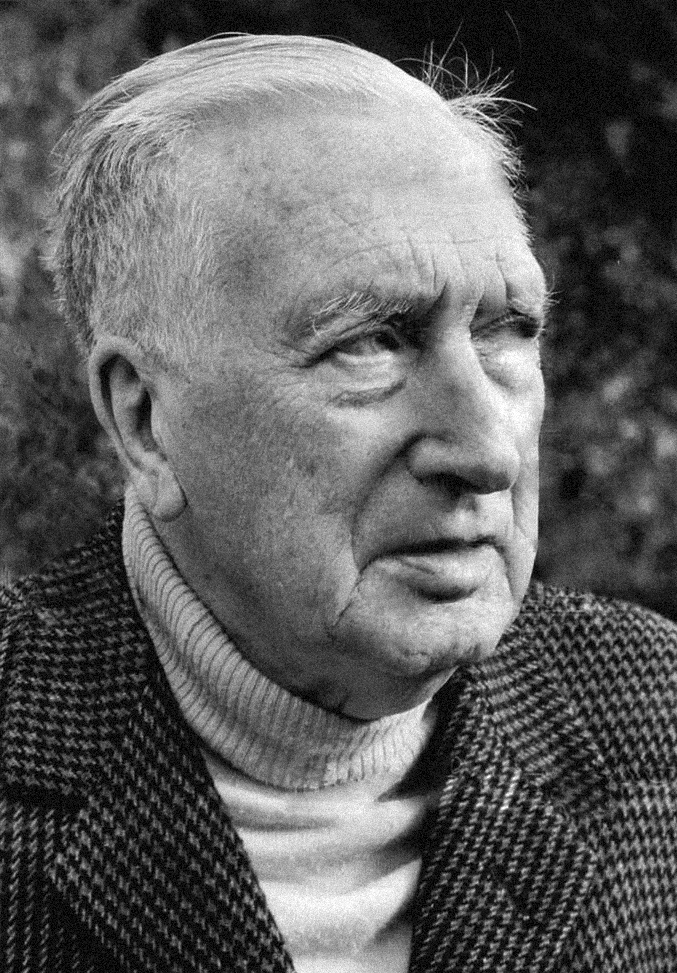
William Walton in 1976

Improvisations on an Impromptu of Benjamin Britten is an orchestral piece by William Walton. It was first performed by the San Francisco Symphony Orchestra, conducted by Josef Krips, on 14 January 1970. Its European premiere was at Benjamin Britten's Aldeburgh Festival in June of that year. The work has subsequently been recorded for commercial release.

== Background and first performances ==
Walton wrote Improvisations on an Impromptu of Benjamin Britten in response to a commission from the scientist Ralph Dorfman for an orchestral work for the San Francisco Symphony Orchestra in memory of his first wife, Adeline. Dorfman had left the choice of composer to the orchestra's conductor, Josef Krips, who approached Walton in late 1967. Walton accepted the commission and, following an idea he had been considering for some time, he approached his fellow composer Benjamin Britten for permission to use a theme from the latter's Piano Concerto.

Britten's theme, labelled an impromptu, was added to the score of the concerto in 1945 when he revised it. Walton had it in mind to follow his own practice with his Variations on a Theme by Hindemith (1963), beginning with a treatment of the theme in the style of the original composer and gradually transforming it into his own style as the work progressed. The theme Walton used was nine bars in length, described by the critic Michael Kennedy as "a stately, melancholy theme, constructed from a descending phrase of augmented seconds, minor thirds, and semitones, with intervals of major and minor thirds and semitones," and by his colleague Stanley Sadie as "a highly characteristic one, winding in thirds, carrying implications of shifting tonalities, and with a curious blend of the sweet and the elegiac."

By April 1969 Walton was ready to allow the orchestra to announce the premiere for early the following year. Dorfman was unhappy with Walton's original title, Elegiac Variations on a Theme of Benjamin Britten: he did not wish his wife to be commemorated with a mournful piece. Walton changed the title and, Kennedy speculates, added the upbeat "giocoso" coda to the piece, to meet Dorfman's wishes – "a necessary afterthought". The orchestral material was ready only a few days before the performance, but the performance was a success. The European premiere took place the following June, given by the Royal Liverpool Philharmonic Orchestra under Charles Groves at Britten's Aldeburgh Festival.

== Structure ==
The piece is in a single continuous movement, comprising four sections containing five variations or "improvisations". It is scored for three flutes (third doubling piccolo), three oboes (third doubling cor anglais), three clarinets (third doubling bass clarinet), three bassoons (third doubling contrabassoon), four horns, three trumpets, three trombones, tuba, timpani, three percussionists (glockenspiel, xylophone, clash cymbals, suspended cymbal, bass drum, tambourine, three bongos, side drum), harp and strings.

The sections of the work are:

- Lento – Movendo
- Vivo – Più animato poco a poco
- Moderato
- Scherzando – Giocoso

The playing time is typically between 13 and 16 minutes. (Note: CD recordings conducted by André Previn, Bryden Thomson and Edward Gardner take 16m 9s, 15m 17s, and 13m 34s respectively.)

After a short, hushed string introduction, which Kennedy comments may suggest the skies of Britten's beloved East Anglia, Britten's nine-bar theme is played by clarinet, accompanied by the original triadic harmonies, on harp and pizzicato lower strings, with muted trumpet and trombone. The analyst Anthony Burton describes the salient features of the theme as "a series of descents in alternating minor thirds and semitones", and towards the end "an upward-curving arch of triads". At first Walton deploys textures as spare as in a Britten score and gradually moves towards his own more luxuriant style. In Britten's work, the main theme is repeated and developed in the manner of a passacaglia; Walton treats it more freely, carrying thematic treatments across from one sequence to the next.

The first sequence, marked by descending intervals, gradually introduces what Burton calls "Walton's familiar brittle scherzo manner", and ends with a sustained acceleration. This is followed by a lyrical interlude, in which the descending intervals are compressed into three-note chords, and the theme is transformed by octave shifts into a broad string melody. The work approaches its conclusion with a lively scherzo and a smooth trio section, and the piece ends with an emphatic giocoso coda, syncopated and animated.

== Critical reception ==
After the British premiere, Sadie described the piece as "a fascinating product of the contact between two musical minds". In The Guardian Edward Greenfield said that the work broke new ground in the spareness of the harmony: "The familiar Waltonian lines of melody are there, but at the opening and in the first two improvisations it is as though Walton was deliberately imitating Britten in preferring bare unisons to his usual rich texture. Only in the third of the five improvisations does Walton start piling on his characteristic added notes."

== Recordings ==
The William Walton Trust's website lists two recordings of the work. The first, from 1972, is by the London Symphony Orchestra conducted by André Previn; the second is by the London Philharmonic Orchestra conducted by Bryden Thomson. Krips, conductor of the premiere, conducted a live recording with the Concertgebouw Orchestra in 1972. A more recent recording was issued by Chandos Records in 2015, with the BBC Symphony Orchestra conducted by Edward Gardner.

== Notes, references and sources ==
=== Sources ===
- Kennedy, Michael (1989). Portrait of Walton. Oxford: Oxford University Press. ISBN 978-0-19-816705-1.
