= Viola Concerto (Walton) =

Work by William Walton, written 1921, revised 1961

From left: Osbert, Edith and Sacheverell Sitwell, and William Walton, with Neil Porter of the Old Vic 1926

The Viola Concerto by William Walton was written in 1929 and first performed at the Queen's Hall, London on 3 October of that year by Paul Hindemith as soloist and the composer conducting. It had been written with the violist Lionel Tertis in mind, and he took the work up after initially rejecting it. The concerto established Walton as a substantial figure in British music and has been recorded by leading violists internationally. Walton revised the instrumentation of the concerto in 1961, lightening the orchestral textures.

== Background and first performances ==
In 1929 William Walton was regarded as an avant-garde composer, best known for Façade (1923), which had been a succès de scandale at its premiere. His exuberant and harmonically edgy concert overture Portsmouth Point (1926) maintained his reputation as an enfant terrible. Towards the end of 1928 the conductor Sir Thomas Beecham suggested that Walton should write a concerto for the violist Lionel Tertis, for whom composers including Vaughan Williams and Bax had written major works. After some preliminary discussion Walton agreed. He wrote the concerto while wintering in Amalfi, Italy, with his friends and patrons the Sitwells. He wrote in December 1928 that he was working hard on the piece, and in February 1929 that he had finished the second movement. He said he considered the concerto potentially his finest work to date, although whether this assessment would hold true would depend on how the third movement turned out.

On his return to England in the spring of 1929, Walton sent the completed concerto to Tertis, who immediately rejected it because of its modernity. Tertis later realised his error and wrote in his autobiography:

With shame and contrition I admit that when the composer offered me the first performance, I declined it. … I had not learnt to appreciate Walton’s style. The innovations in his musical language which now seem so logical and so truly in the mainstream of music then struck me as far-fetched. It took me time to realize what a tower of strength in the literature of the viola is this concerto.

Walton was so disappointed by Tertis's refusal that he considered recasting the concerto for violin and orchestra. It is not clear where the suggestion came from that the German composer and violist Paul Hindemith should be invited to premiere the work. In 1974 Tertis wrote in his memoirs that he had recommended Hindemith to Walton, but Walton had recalled in 1962 that the idea came from Edward Clark of the BBC music department. Clark sent the manuscript to Hindemith, who agreed to give the first performance.

The first performance was at the Proms at the Queen's Hall, London, on 3 October 1929; Hindemith was the soloist and the Henry Wood Symphony Orchestra (Note: For contractual reasons the Queen's Hall Orchestra was obliged to use a collective pseudonym in the late 1920s and early 1930s.) was conducted by the composer. Hindemith did not possess an immaculate technique, but played with strong character, a full tone and great emotion. The composer later wrote that Hindemith's "technique was marvellous, but he was rough—no nonsense about it. He just stood up and played." (Note: Hindemith never played the Walton concerto again, but the two composers became lifelong friends, and in 1962 Walton composed Variations on a Theme by Hindemith a tribute to his friend, dedicated to "Paul and Gertrud Hindemith".) Tertis, who attended the premiere, realised that he had made a mistake in rejecting the concerto and soon took it up. When it was selected for performance at the International Society for Contemporary Music festival in Liège in September 1930, Tertis was the soloist, with Walton conducting. Over the next three years Tertis gave five more performances of the concerto.

=== 1961 revision ===
Walton was given to revising his works after their first performances, and in 1961 he thinned the orchestration of the Viola Concerto, reducing the woodwind from triple to double, omitting one trumpet and the tuba, and adding a harp. The revised version was first performed at the Royal Festival Hall, London, on 18 January 1962, with John Coulling as soloist and the London Philharmonic Orchestra conducted by Sir Malcolm Sargent. There is some uncertainty about the solo part in this version. The violist Frederick Riddle, with whom Walton performed the work many times, made some adjustments to the solo line. He understood that Walton approved his changes and intended to incorporate them in the score of the revision, but when it was published, in 1962, the original line remained intact. In a 2006 study of the concerto, James F. Dunham attributes the omission of Riddle's revisions to a mistake by the publishers. A 2001 biography of Walton reports the composer's specific preference for his original version, without Riddle's alterations.

== Analysis ==
The concerto carries the dedication "To Christabel" (the Hon. Mrs Henry McLaren, with whom Walton had a platonic friendship despite mutual physical attraction). The original scoring is for piccolo, two flutes, two oboes, cor anglais, two clarinets, bass clarinet, two bassoons, contrabassoon, four horns, three trumpets, three trombones, tuba, timpani and strings. The 1961 revision (published in 1962) stipulates two flutes (one doubling piccolo), oboe, cor anglais, two clarinets (second doubling bass clarinet), two bassoons, four horns, two trumpets, three trombones, timpani, harp and strings. The playing time of the concerto is about 25 minutes.

In his study of Walton, Michael Kennedy comments that in its design the Viola Concerto resembles Elgar's Cello Concerto in beginning with a slow ("or at any rate ruminative") movement followed by a quick scherzo, and concentrating most weight into the finale, "which ends in a mood of pathos by recalling the principal theme of the first movement". Influences suggested by other writers are Prokofiev in his First Violin Concerto (1923), and Hindemith in his Kammermusik No. 5 (1927). (Note: Walton commented that he was surprised Hindemith agreed to play the concerto as "one or two bars are almost identical" to Kammermusik No. 5.)

=== I. Andante comodo ===
The first movement, marked andante comodo, is in what Howes describes as a regular but condensed sonata form. After a three-bar introduction in which muted strings and low clarinet establish the tonality of A minor the viola enters with a melancholy 9/8 theme, in the middle register of the instrument. The theme is passed to the oboe, with the viola accompanying; then the viola repeats the theme in the high register. The pace quickens and a series of viola chords leads to the second subject, a tranquil theme in D minor, for the viola in its lower register. The themes are developed at varying dynamics and speeds, with solo viola and orchestra handing the themes to and fro and playing them in canon at times. There is no formal cadenza. After a vigorous tutti the movement ends quietly with the melancholic theme with which it began, clashing A Major over A Minor harmonies and unsettling the listener before quietly dying away.

=== II. Vivo, con molto preciso ===
The second movement, unusually for a concerto, has the character of a scherzo. The first part, is in a quartal harmony, but it still suggests an E minor tonality. The tempo marking vivo con moto preciso, is in a basic 2/4 time but with many changes of metre. There is a climactic section for the full orchestra.

=== III. Finale – Allegro moderato ===
In the words of the musicologist Christopher Palmer, "Here Walton pulls out all the stops". It is the longest of the three movements and as Frank Howes puts it in his study of Walton's music, it gathers up the mercurial emotions of the first two movements and reveals their serious purpose. The first theme is lively, elongating the rising fourths heard in the scherzo to rising fifths. It is introduced by the bassoon, followed by the viola over a pizzicato bass line, and is continued by the winds in contrapuntal lines. The second subject, deriving from the rocking figure of the first movement, is in the minor key. The development section mainly features on the first theme, gradually dividing it into fragments accompanying a long cantabile theme for the viola and later the woodwind. In the recapitulation, the first theme is given to the full orchestra, and the second to woodwinds and horns, with a viola counter-theme. A development passage leads to the coda that draws the earlier themes into a characteristic Walton fugal treatment, leading to the climactic synthesis of the themes.

== Critical reception ==
The work was greeted with enthusiasm. It brought Walton to the forefront of British classical music. In The Manchester Guardian, Eric Blom wrote, "This young composer is a born genius" and said that it was tempting to call the concerto the best thing in recent music of any nationality. The musical scholar Sir Donald Tovey wrote:

There are so few concertos for viola that (even if I happened to know any others) it would be a poor compliment to say this was the finest. Any concerto for viola must be a tour de force; but this seems to me to be one of the most important modern concertos for any instrument, and I can see no limits to what may be expected of the tone-poet who could create it.

In 1931 the teenage Benjamin Britten, later a friend but not an uncritical admirer of Walton, wrote in his diary about "Walton's wonderful Vla Concerto (beautifully played by Tertis) … a work of genius". A dissenting voice was that of Sir Edward Elgar, who heard the concerto at the Three Choirs Festival in 1932 – the only time the two composers met. Elgar did not like the work and is said to have expressed dismay privately that "such music should be thought fit for a stringed instrument".

== Ballet ==
In 1972 the choreographer Joe Layton used the concerto for a ballet about Oscar Wilde, O.W., given by the Royal Ballet at Sadler's Wells Theatre, London. The prologue of the ballet was danced to music from Walton's The Quest, and for the main section the Viola Concerto was used. At the premiere Riddle was the viola soloist.

== Recordings ==
Soloist	Orchestra	Conductor	Year	Timing
Frederick Riddle	London Symphony Orchestra	William Walton	1937	22'52"
William Primrose	Philharmonia Orchestra	William Walton	1946	22'44"
William Primrose	Royal Philharmonic Orchestra	Sir Malcolm Sargent	1954	21'15"
Yehudi Menuhin	New Philharmonia Orchestra	Sir William Walton	1968	25'44"
Paul Doktor	London Philharmonic Orchestra	Edward Downes	1969	24'46"
Peter Schidlof	BBC Symphony Orchestra	Colin Davis	1972	22'28"
Nigel Kennedy	Royal Philharmonic Orchestra	André Previn	1987	25'51"
Nobuko Imai	London Philharmonic Orchestra	Jan Latham-Koenig	1992	26'21"
Yuri Bashmet	London Symphony Orchestra	André Previn	1994	25'46"
Bruno Pasquier	Orchestre Symphonique Français	Layrent Petitgirard	1994	25'10"
Tabea Zimmermann	RTVE Symphony Orchestra	David Shallon	1994	24'59"
Lars Anders Tomter	English Northern Philharmonia	Paul Daniel	1995	25'58"
Paul Neubauer	Bournemouth Symphony Orchestra	Andrew Litton	1996	24'16"
Maxim Vengerov	London Symphony Orchestra	Mstislav Rostropovich	2002	30'28"
Lawrence Power	BBC Scottish Symphony Orchestra	Ilan Volkov	2007	24'51"
Karen Dreyfus	Warsaw Philharmonic Orchestra	Jerzy Swoboda	2009	25'48"
Roberto Díaz	New Haven Symphony Orchestra	William Boughton	2014	26'43"
Hong-Mei Xiao	Budapest Symphony Orchestra	János Kovács	2017	26'06"
Eivind Holtsmark Ringstad	Oslo Philharmonic Orchestra	Joshua Weilerstein	2017	27'24"
Nils Mönkemeyer	Bamberg Symphony	Markus Poschner	2017	27'09"
James Ehnes	BBC Symphony Orchestra	Edward Gardner	2018	23'22"
David Aaron Carpenter	London Philharmonic Orchestra	Vladimir Jurowski	2018	25'08"
Helen Callus	New Zealand Symphony Orchestra	Marc Taddei	2018	27'19"
Isabelle van Keulen	NDR Radiophilharmonie	Keri-Lynn Wilson	2018	26'13"
Adrien la Marca	Liège Philharmonic Orchestra	Christian Arming	2020	26:24

The Riddle, Primrose and Power versions use the original scoring.

Source: Naxos Music Library.

== Notes, references and sources ==
=== Sources ===
- Elkin, Robert (1944). Queen's Hall, 1893–1941. London: Rider. OCLC 636583612.
- Howes, Frank (1973). The Music of William Walton (second ed.). London: Oxford University Press. ISBN 978-0-19-315431-5.
- Kennedy, Michael (1989). Portrait of Walton. Oxford: Oxford University Press. ISBN 978-0-19-816705-1.
- Lloyd, Stephen (2001). William Walton: Muse of Fire. Woodbridge, Suffolk and Rochester, New York: Boydell Press. ISBN 978-0-85115-803-7.
- Morin, Alexander (2002). Classical Music: The Listener's Companion. San Francisco: Backbeat Books. ISBN 978-0-87930-638-0.
- Tierney, Neil (1984). William Walton: His Life and Music. London: Robert Hale. ISBN 978-0-70-901784-4.
- Tovey, Donald Francis (1936). Essays In Musical Analysis Vol III: Concertos. London: Oxford University Press. OCLC 277272838.
