= Frederick Riddle =

British violist

Frederick Craig Riddle OBE (20 April 1912 – 5 February 1995) was a British violist. He was considered to be in the line from Lionel Tertis and William Primrose, through to the violists of today such as Lawrence Power.

== Early life and career ==
Frederick Riddle was born in Liverpool in 1912. He studied at the Royal College of Music (RCM) in London from 1928 to 1933. He had a solo career while playing with the London Symphony Orchestra from 1933 to 1938. In 1938, was appointed principal viola with the London Philharmonic Orchestra. He was a professor of the RCM from 1948 onwards. In 1953, he succeeded Harry Danks as principal violist of the Royal Philharmonic Orchestra. In that same year he was selected by Sir Adrian Boult to play in the orchestra for the Coronation of Elizabeth II.

Riddle was distinguished as a chamber music player and a concerto soloist. He made the first recording of William Walton's Viola Concerto, on 6 December 1937, with the composer conducting. He was recommended for this recording by Lionel Tertis. He made some revisions to the concerto, with Walton's approval. Although Walton conducted the work many times with leading soloists such as Tertis and William Primrose, the interpretation he liked above all others was Riddle's. He also performed the work in concert under Beecham.

== Personal life and death ==
Riddle was married twice, and had three daughters. He was appointed an Officer of the Order of the British Empire (OBE) in the 1980 Birthday Honours. His first wife was soprano, conductor, and voice teacher Audrey Langford. In 1946, he married soprano singer Helen Clare.

He died in Newport on the Isle of Wight in 1995, aged 82. He was survived by Clare, his second wife, who died in 2018, at the age of 101.

== Premieres ==
Works that Frederick Riddle premiered included:

- Malcolm Arnold's Viola Sonata, in the 1940s.
- Arthur Benjamin's Viola Concerto, in 1949, with the Hallé Orchestra under Sir John Barbirolli.
- Concerto for Viola (arranged from the works of G. F. Handel by John Barbirolli). Cheltenham, June 1949. Hallé Orchestra, cond. John Barbirolli.
- Elizabeth Lutyens's Viola Concerto, Op.15, in 1950 at the Promenade Concerts, with the BBCSO and John Hollingsworth conducting.
- Giorgio Federico Ghedini's Viola Concerto, in 1953, with Beecham conducting.
- Martin Dalby's Viola concerto, written for Riddle. First performance at BBC Proms, 1974. BBC Symphony Orchestra, cond. Norman Del Mar.
- Justin Connolly's Anima for viola and orchestra, in 1975, with the Royal Philharmonic Orchestra under Sir Charles Groves
- Howard Blake's Prelude for Solo Viola, Op. 402, in 1980

== Appearances and recordings ==
He appeared in such works as:

- Berlioz: Harold en Italie (recorded with Beecham and Hermann Scherchen)
- Delius: Serenade from incidental music to James Elroy Flecker's Hassan (recorded with Beecham)
- E.J. Moeran: Trio for Strings in G major, R. 59 (recorded with Jean Pougnet, violin; and Anthony Pini, 2nd viola)
- Mozart: Duo for Violin and Viola No. 1 in G major, K 423 (recorded with Szymon Goldberg)
- Mozart: Trio for Clarinet, Viola and Piano in E flat, K 498 ("Kegelstatt Trio") (recorded with Reginald Kell and Louis Kentner)
- Rubbra: Viola Concerto in A, Op. 75 (with Beecham)
- Richard Strauss: Don Quixote (recorded with John Kennedy, RPO, Beecham conducting)
- Vaughan Williams: Flos Campi (with the Bournemouth Sinfonietta and Bournemouth Sinfonietta Chorus, under Norman Del Mar)
- Vaughan Williams: Suite for Viola

== Sources ==
- Grove Dictionary of Music and Musicians, 5th ed, 1954, Vol. VII, p. 160
- Music Web International
