= La Mortella =

Private garden in the island of Ischia, Italy

Coordinates: 40.7531°N 13.8725°E

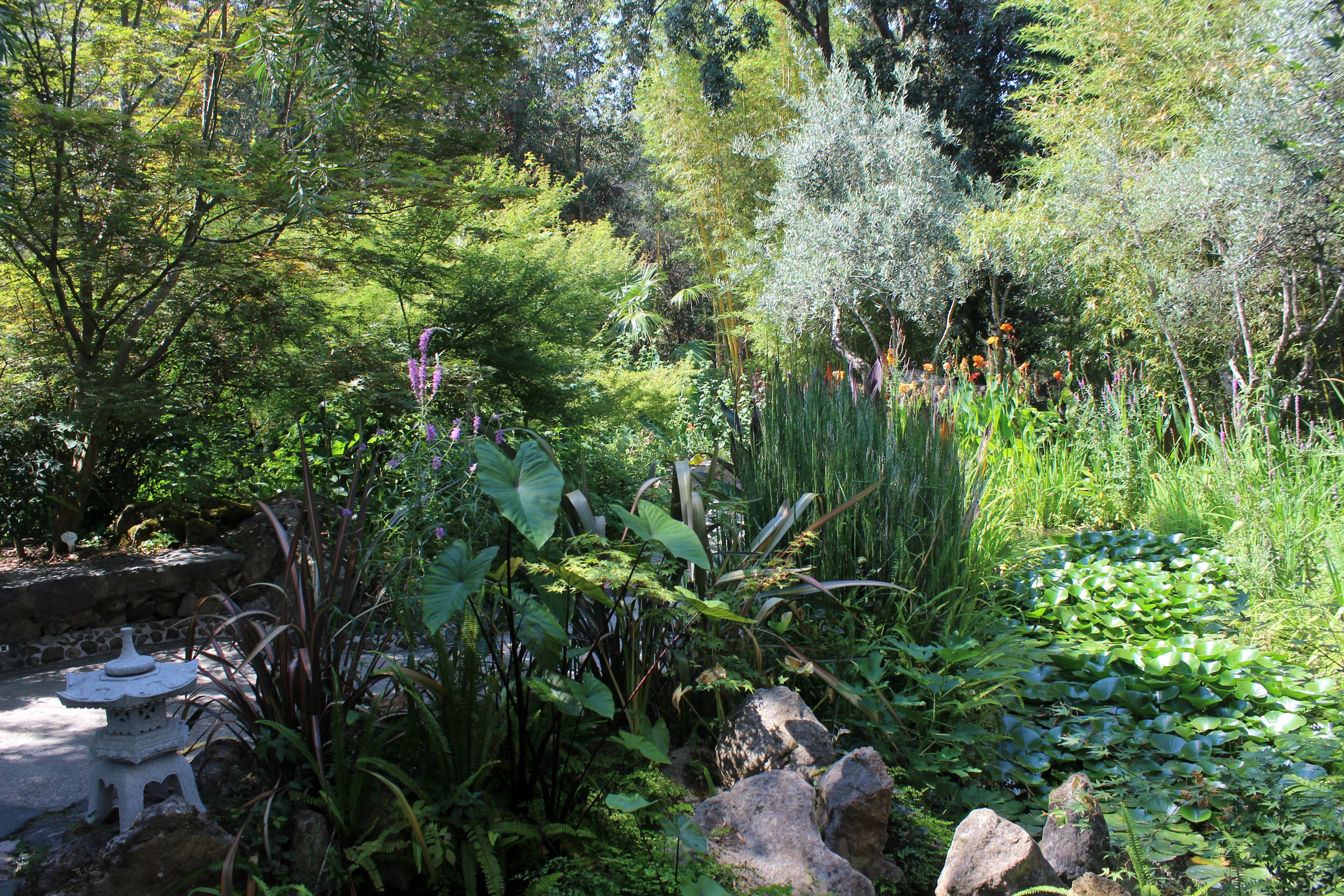
The Oriental garden

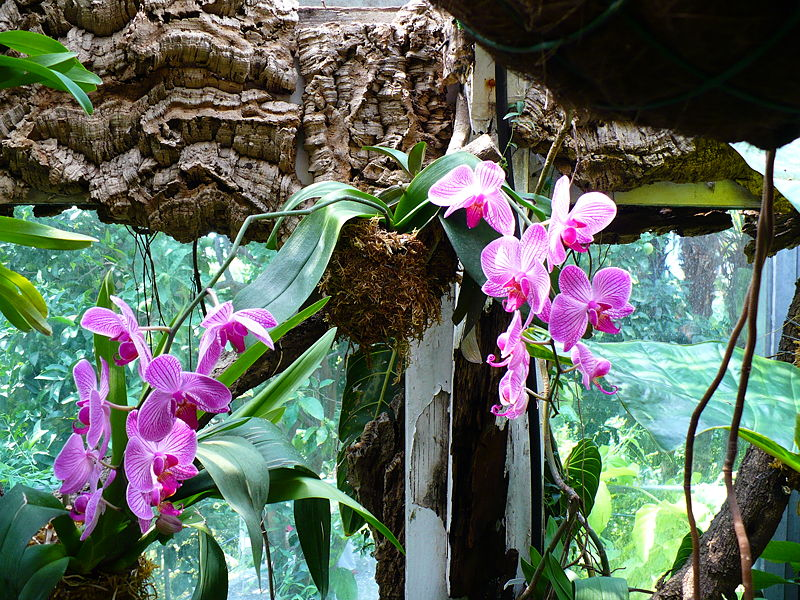
Orchids in the La Mortella conservatory

Location of La Mortella in Italy

La Mortella (Italian: place of myrtles) is a private garden in the island of Ischia, Italy. It was first opened to the public in 1991. It was created by Susana Walton (1926–2010), wife of the composer William Walton, starting in the 1950s as the main residence for the couple.

Tropical and Mediterranean plants were planted and some have now reached considerable proportions. The gardens include views over the city and harbour of Forio. The British garden designer Russell Page provided advice on the initial design, but the garden evolved over the course of more than 50 years of development by Lady Walton. After her husband died in 1983, his ashes were kept under a rock on this island. She opened the garden to the public in 1991 and handed over management and eventually ownership to the Fondazione William Walton.

A museum dedicated to the life and work of William Walton is now part of the garden complex. It hosts the William Walton Foundation and a Greek Theatre where Italian and foreign schools of music perform more than 70 weekend concerts, plus masterclasses and a programme for composers from Harvard University. In 2004 it was awarded First Prize as il più bel parco d’Italia (the most beautiful park in Italy) by the American company Briggs & Stratton, against competition from 100 other gardens.
