= Orb and Sceptre =

1953 march by Sir William Walton

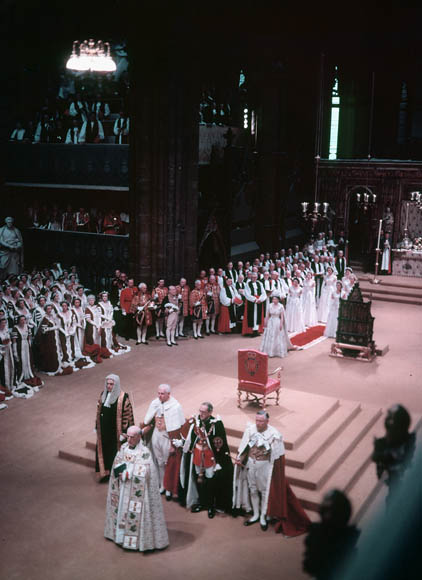
The coronation of Queen Elizabeth II for which the march was composed

Orb and Sceptre is a march for orchestra written by William Walton for the coronation of Queen Elizabeth II in Westminster Abbey, London, on 2 June 1953. It follows the pattern of earlier concert marches by Elgar and Walton himself in consisting of a brisk opening section followed by a broad melody in the middle, trio, section and a return to the lively first theme to conclude the piece after a second appearance of the big tune.

== Background and first performances ==
Walton had composed the march Crown Imperial, in 1936 for the coronation of Elizabeth II's father, King George VI. It was generally well received – the BBC predicted that it would be ranked alongside Elgar's Pomp and Circumstance Marches – but disappointed those of Walton's admirers who thought of him as an avant-garde composer. By 1953 Walton was no longer perceived as avant-garde, and a ceremonial march in the Elgar tradition was generally expected. Orb and Sceptre was commissioned by the Arts Council of Great Britain, and Walton obtained permission to dedicate the piece to the Queen, a considerable honour, as such permission was rarely granted.

Walton said that he had taken the title of Crown Imperial from a speech in Shakespeare's Henry V:

I am a king that find thee, and I know
'Tis not the balm, the sceptre and the ball,
The sword, the mace, the crown imperial,
The intertissued robe of gold and pearl,
The farced title running 'fore the king,
The throne he sits on, nor the tide of pomp
That beats upon the high shore of this world,
No, not all these, thrice-gorgeous ceremony,
Not all these, laid in bed majestical,
Can sleep so soundly as the wretched slave.

Turning to the same speech for the title of his new work, he said he jibbed at Ball and Sceptre and turned it into Orb and Sceptre. (He said he was reserving Bed Majestical for the coronation of King Charles III.)

Orb and Sceptre was recorded for the gramophone twice before its public debut at the Coronation service. Walton flew from his home in Ischia to conduct the piece with the Philharmonia Orchestra for Columbia on 18 March 1953 at the Kingsway Hall, and Sir Malcolm Sargent conducted the work with the London Symphony Orchestra (LSO) for Decca at the same venue. The public premiere was given by the Coronation Orchestra (a specially convened ensemble comprising leading players from British orchestras and string quartets) conducted by Sir Adrian Boult. The first concert performance was by the LSO conducted by Sir John Barbirolli at the Royal Festival Hall five days later. Walton conducted the first American performance of the work at the Hollywood Bowl on 13 August 1953, in his debut conducting appearance in the US.

== Structure ==
The critic Frank Howes finds the opening section of the work more thematically complex than that of Crown Imperial. It begins in the key of E major with bright trumpet fanfares before leaping into the march section, heavily syncopated and brightly orchestrated. This section moves briefly through what Howes calls a "drastic modulation" into C major before returning to E.

As with Crown Imperial the middle section is a quieter trio in C, marked meno mosso. This theme is heard subdued on the strings, before being repeated in its more stately and grand form. The main march section is then heard again, building up to the final hearing of the trio section back in the home key of E. This time Walton uses the whole orchestra, the tune shared between fortissimo strings and fanfare-like brass. A short, fast coda ends the piece.

== Instrumentation ==
Orb and Sceptre is scored for piccolo, 2 flutes, 2 oboes, English horn, 3 clarinets in A, 2 bassoons, contrabassoon, 4 horns in F, 3 trumpets in C, 3 trombones, tuba, timpani, snare drum, cymbals, bass drum, tambourine, harp, organ (optional), and strings.

== Reception ==
Walton struggled to find inspiration for the piece, and during its composition he thought it would not be as good as Crown Imperial. He later convinced himself that it was not inferior to its predecessor. His biographer Michael Kennedy disagrees, feeling that Orb and Sceptre lacks as fine a central tune and such "vigorous panache" in the fast outer sections as those of Crown Imperial. The Times found the work joyous and youthful, with, in the trio:

a sweeping diatonic tune in C major, reminiscent of Parry as well as Elgar, a tune which looks bland and uncommunicative on paper but which, in performance, lifts up the heart in homage and thanksgiving.

== Arrangements ==
Orb and Sceptre has been arranged for organ by Sir William McKie, for piano and for small orchestra, both by Roy Douglas, and for military band.

== Recordings ==
- Philharmonia Orchestra, Sir William Walton, 1953
- London Symphony Orchestra, Sir Malcolm Sargent 1953
- Royal Liverpool Philharmonic Orchestra, Sir Charles Groves, 1969
- City of Birmingham Symphony Orchestra, Louis Frémaux 1976
- Boston Pops Orchestra, John Williams, 1980
- Bournemouth Symphony Orchestra, David Hill, 1991
- Philharmonia Orchestra, Sir David Willcocks, 1991
- Robert Gower organ [arr. Gower], 1996
- English Northern Philharmonia, Paul Daniel, 2001
- The Band of the Scots Guards [arr. Richardson], Major R. J. Owen, 2002

Source: Walton Trust.

== References and sources ==
=== Sources ===
- Howes, Frank (1973). The Music of William Walton. London and New York: Oxford University Press. ISBN 978-0-19-315431-5.
- Kennedy, Michael (1989). Portrait of Walton. Oxford: Oxford University Press. ISBN 978-0-19-816705-1.
- Lloyd, Stephen (2002). William Walton: Muse of Fire. Woodbridge: Boydell. ISBN 978-0-85115-803-7.
- Tierney, Neil (1984). William Walton: His Life and Music. London: Robert Hale. ISBN 978-0-70-901784-4.
