= Susana, Lady Walton =

Argentine writer

Susana, Lady Walton MBE OMRI
- Born: 30 August 1926; Buenos Aires, Argentina
- Died: 21 March 2010 (aged 83); Ischia, Italy
- Resting place: La Mortella, Ischia, Italy
- Occupation: Writer
- Spouse: Sir William Turner Walton (m. 1948–1983)

Susana, Lady Walton (30 August 1926 – 21 March 2010), born Susana Valeria Rosa Maria Gil Passo, was the Argentinian wife of the British composer Sir William Walton (1902–1983). She was a writer and the creator of the gardens of La Mortella on the island of Ischia, Italy.

Born in Buenos Aires in 1926, Lady Walton was the daughter of a prominent Argentinian lawyer, Dr Enrique Gil. She was educated at a college run by Spanish nuns where she took a diploma in accountancy followed by a degree as a public translator in English. She was working at the British Council in Buenos Aires when she met Walton in October 1948. They married two months later in December 1948. The couple settled on the Italian island of Ischia where she created the gardens of La Mortella.

The residence hosted many celebrities, including Laurence Olivier and Vivien Leigh, Hans Werner Henze, W. H. Auden, Terence Rattigan, Binkie Beaumont, Maria Callas and Charlie Chaplin. William Walton died at La Mortella on 8 March 1983.

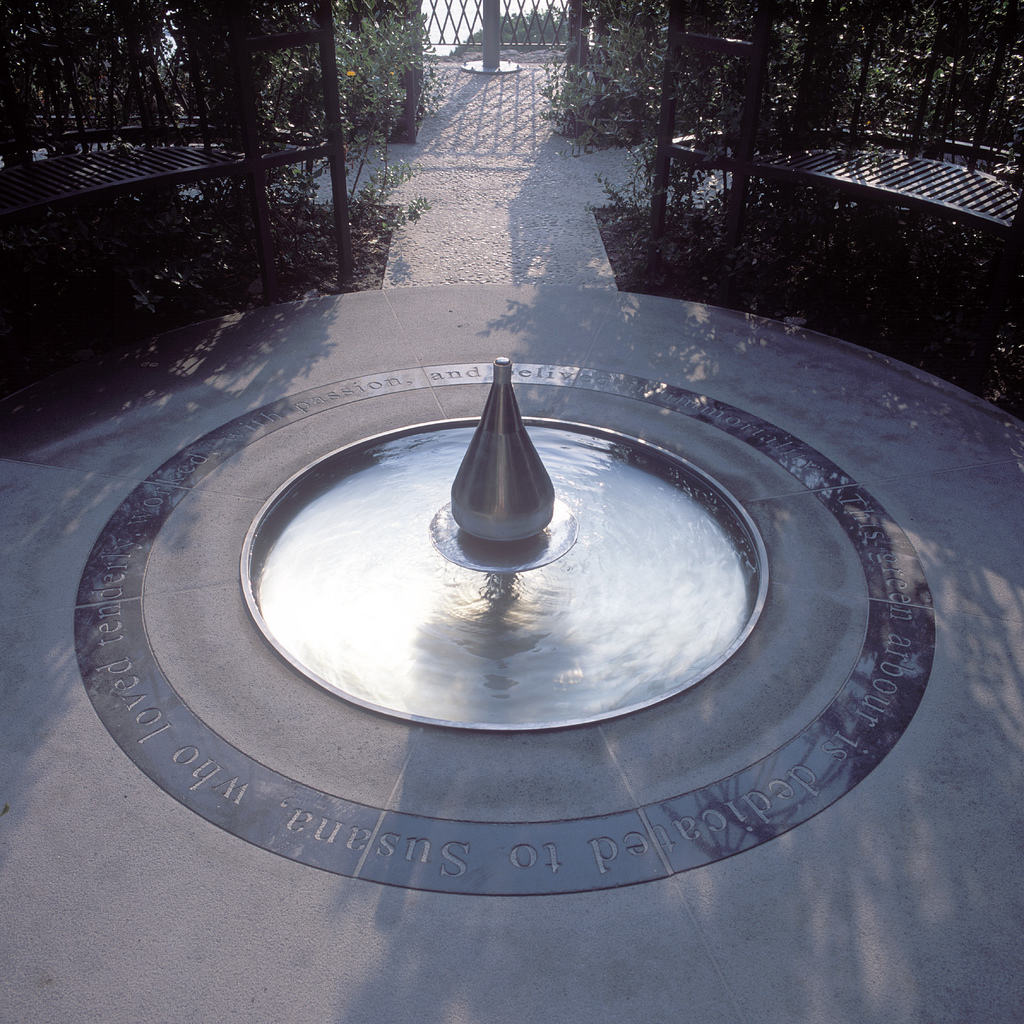
The Nymphaeum – Lady Walton created her own memorial at La Mortella. The inscription reads: This green arbour is dedicated to Susana, who loved tenderly, worked with passion and believed in immortality.

Lady Walton appeared alongside her husband in his only acting role; King Frederick Augustus II of Saxony as the King's wife Maria Anna of Bavaria in the 1983 miniseries Wagner, directed by Tony Palmer. She also appeared in Palmer's documentary William Walton: At the Haunted End of the Day (1981) and in Ken Russell's Classic Widows (1995).

Shortly after her marriage she had an abortion at Walton's insistence, as he did not want any children. She wrote two books and founded the William Walton Foundation in 1983. In 2002, Prince Charles visited La Mortella Garden and Lady Walton.

Lady Walton was awarded an honorary degree from the University of Nottingham, an MBE in 2000 and the Order of Merit of the Italian Republic (Grande Ufficiale). In 1990 she made a well-received recording of Walton's Façade.

She died on 21 March 2010, aged 83, from natural causes.

== Books ==
- Walton, Susana. William Walton: Behind the Façade, Oxford University Press (1988).
- Walton, Susana. La Mortella: An Italian Garden Paradise, New Holland Publishers (2002).
