= Martin Dalby =

Scottish composer (1942–2018)

- Born: John Martin Dalby; 25 April 1942; Aberdeen, Scotland
- Died: 25 October 2018 (aged 76)
- Occupations: Composer; music administrator
- Spouse: Hilary Belcher (m. 1984)

John Martin Dalby (25 April 1942 – 25 October 2018) was a Scottish composer and music administrator. He was Head of Music at BBC Scotland from 1972 to 1991.

== Early life and career ==
Dalby was born in 1942 in Aberdeen; his father John Dalby was responsible for the city's music education system, and organist of St Machar's Cathedral. He was educated at Aberdeen Grammar School, and won a scholarship to the Royal College of Music in London, where he studied viola with Frederick Riddle and compositions with Herbert Howells. With a Sir James Caird travelling scholarship, he lived for two years in Italy, where he studied composition with Goffredo Petrassi, and played viola in a chamber orchestra.

In 1965 he became a music producer to the BBC's Music Programme (later Radio 3) in London, where he worked with Hans Keller, Robert Simpson and Deryck Cooke.

In 1971 he was appointed Cramb Research Fellow in Composition at the University of Glasgow.

== BBC Scotland ==
In 1972 he was appointed Head of Music at BBC Scotland. He was much involved with the BBC Scottish Symphony Orchestra, programming concerts, selecting solosts and arranging visits.

In 1980 the BBC proposed the disbandment of the BBC Scottish Symphony Orchestra (and other BBC orchestras); Dalby, risking his job, campaigned to save the orchestra, and it survived.

He supported the St Magnus Festival in Orkney, so that in its early years concerts were broadcast. With John Purser, Dalby worked on a 30-part radio series Scotland's Music, which won a Sony Gold Award.

He remained as Head of Music until 1991, and retired from the BBC in 1993. He continued to compose, and from 1995 to 1998 he was chairman of the Composers' Guild of Great Britain.

In 1984 Dalby married Hilary Belcher, a violinist; there were no children.

== Compositions ==
Dalby composed music for orchestra, chamber music, music for the church, works for choir, brass band and wind band, and music for film, radio and television. Many of his works were commissions.

Compositions include a Viola Concerto, performed at the Proms in 1974 with soloist Frederick Riddle; The Mary Bean, written for the Royal Scottish National Orchestra and performed at the Proms; The White Maa, written for the Scottish Chamber Orchestra to celebrate 200 years of Union Street, Aberdeen; and a String Quartet to celebrate 500 years of the University of Aberdeen.

== Tributes ==
A road in Aylesbury, Buckinghamshire is named "Martin Dalby Way" in his honour.
