= Crown Imperial (march) =

1937 orchestral march by William Walton

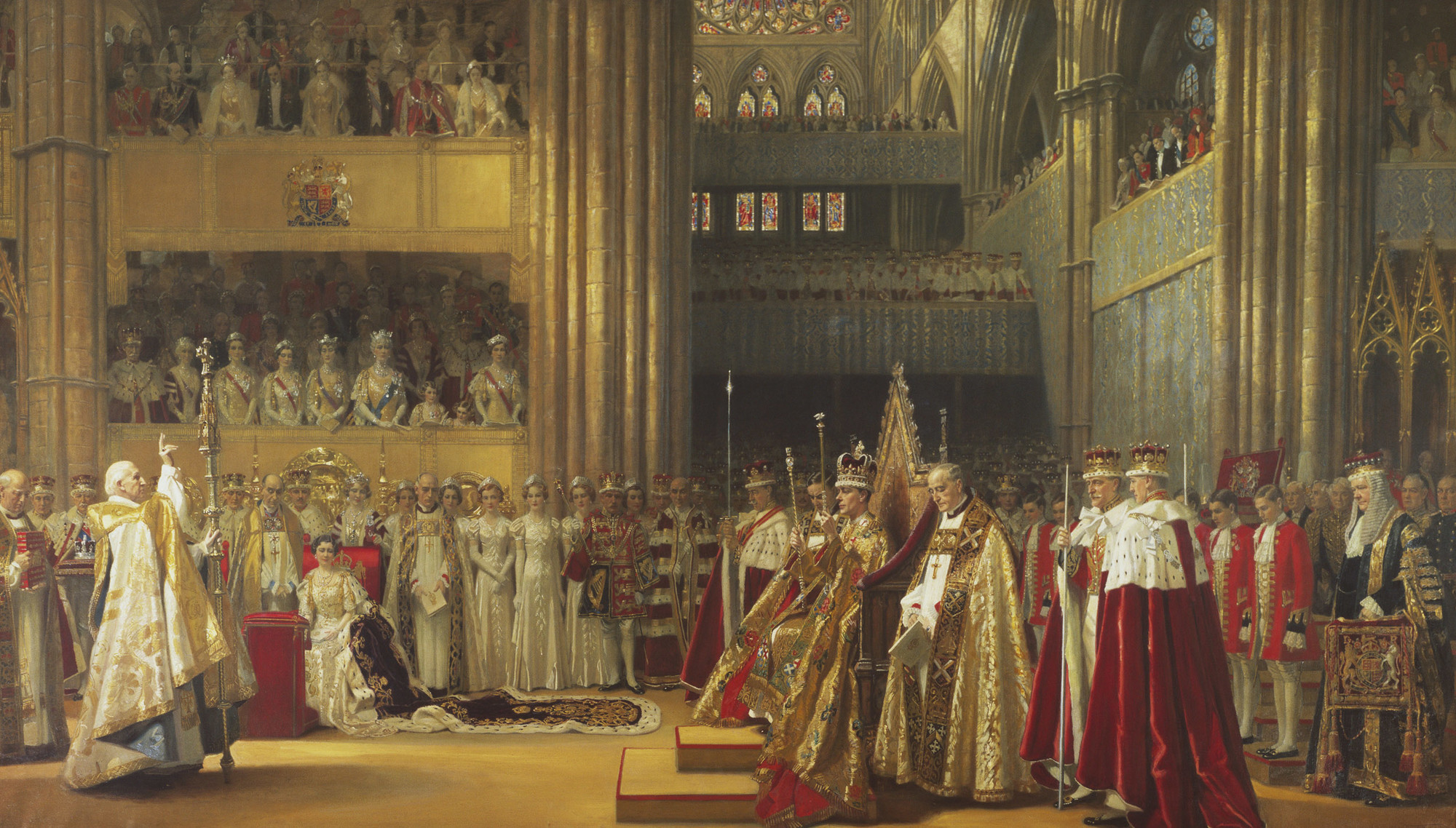
Coronation of King George VI, 1937, for which Crown Imperial was written

Crown Imperial is an orchestral march by William Walton, commissioned for the coronation of King George VI in Westminster Abbey in 1937. It is in the Pomp and Circumstance tradition, with a brisk opening contrasting with a broad middle section, leading to a resounding conclusion. The work has been heard at subsequent state occasions in the Abbey: the coronation of Queen Elizabeth II in 1953, the wedding of Prince William in 2011 and the coronation of King Charles III in 2023. It has been recorded in its original orchestral form and in arrangements for organ, military band and brass band.

== Background and first performances ==
In the 1920s William Walton had been regarded by many as an avant-garde composer, but by the mid-1930s he was seen as in the broad English musical tradition. On the accession of Edward VIII in 1936 the BBC wanted to commission a coronation march in the genre of Elgar's Pomp and Circumstance set. Elgar had died in 1934, and his successor as Britain's best-known composer, Ralph Vaughan Williams, was not given to writing such music. (Note: Vaughan Williams contributed a Te Deum, sung during the service, and described by The Times as "the most important new musical work of this Coronation service".) Kenneth Wright of the BBC's music department wrote to his colleague Julian Herbage in November 1936:

Walton ... would love to be commissioned by the Corporation to write a really fine symphonic Coronation March. No one will doubt that his immense technical ability should produce a March ... of equal value to the existing Elgar Marches. He is the one person of the younger generation of composers most able to do this, and I should like the Corporation to give its approval in principle …

By the time the BBC formally commissioned Walton, in March 1937, King Edward had abdicated and the forthcoming coronation was that of his brother and successor, George VI.

Walton, usually a slow and painstaking worker, wrote Crown Imperial in less than a fortnight. The title may have been drawn from William Dunbar's poem "In Honour of the City of London", which Walton set as a cantata of the same name in 1937; it included the line ‘In beawtie beryng the crone imperial". Walton put those words as a superscription at the head of the march, but he said the inspiration for his title was a speech in Shakespeare's Henry V:

I am a king that find thee, and I know
'Tis not the balm, the sceptre and the ball,
The sword, the mace, the crown imperial,
The intertissued robe of gold and pearl,
The farced title running 'fore the king,
The throne he sits on, nor the tide of pomp
That beats upon the high shore of this world,
No, not all these, thrice-gorgeous ceremony,
Not all these, laid in bed majestical,
Can sleep so soundly as the wretched slave.

He later drew on the same speech for the title of his 1953 coronation march, amending Sceptre and Ball to Orb and Sceptre. (Note: Walton said he was reserving Bed Majestical for the coronation of King Charles III.)

Before its first public hearing the march was performed on 16 April 1937 in HMV's recording studio. Sir Adrian Boult conducted the BBC Symphony Orchestra. Boult and the BBC orchestra broadcast a live performance from the concert hall of Broadcasting House on 9 May. (Note: Kennedy (p. 93) states that the broadcast was conducted by Clarence Raybould, but the Radio Times and The Times both identify Boult as the conductor.)

The march was performed at the coronation on 12 May 1937, by the "Coronation Orchestra", an ad hoc ensemble of Britain's top orchestral players, conducted by Boult. Crown Imperial was part of the musical programme preceding the service, and was played during the procession of Queen Mary, the dowager queen, into the Abbey.

== Structure ==
Crown Imperial is scored for an orchestra of three flutes (third doubling piccolo), two oboes, cor anglais, two clarinets, bass clarinet, two bassoons, contrabassoon – four horns, three trumpets, three trombones, tuba – timpani, two percussion (bass drum, side drum, tenor drum, cymbals, triangle, glockenspiel, tubular bell, large gong) – harp – organ (optional) – strings. Walton revised the work in 1963 and made substantial cuts.

The work is in an ABABC form. It opens in C major with a brisk, rhythmically pointed theme, marked allegro reale (regal). The following trio section, in A-flat major, is a broad cantabile Elgarian theme introduced by clarinets, cor anglais and violas with the other strings providing the accompaniment. Then both march and trio reappear in C again and come to a climax in what the critic Neil Tierney describes as "a conclusion of breathtaking magnificence".

== Critical reception ==
Some critics viewed Crown Imperial as evidence that Walton had abandoned modernism. A reviewer in The Musical Times called it "frankly a pastiche on a well-known model of ternary pomp and circumstance, with the regulation strut and swagger, plenty of plain diatonics, and a nobilmente tune in the middle". The reviewer judged it "unrepresentative of the composer, except as an example of competence" and "unlikely to survive". To some it was "Pomp and Circumstance March No 6". (Note: Since that contemporary jibe there has actually been a Pomp and Circumstance March No 6, completed by Anthony Payne in 2006 from Elgar's sketches.) In Grove's Dictionary of Music and Musicians Byron Adams describes the march in Walton's 1931 cantata Belshazzar's Feast as a parody of Elgar, but he finds Crown Imperial "a less equivocal homage to Elgar ... the finest and most infectious of Walton’s essays in that genre" In a 1984 study of Walton and his music, Neil Tierney calls the work a masterpiece that perfectly conjures up the grandeur and dignity of the Coronation ceremonial – "music which, opulent and grandiloquent like Elgar’s Pomp and Circumstance nationalism, proved worthy of a glorious occasion".

== Arrangements ==
Crown Imperial has been arranged for organ by Herbert Murrill; Christopher Palmer prepared a version for solo organ, brass, timpani and percussion (with harp ad lib), specifically for the Laurence Olivier Memorial Service in October 1989. An arrangement by W. J. Duthoit for military band was published in 1937. Other arrangements include one for solo piano by Walton (1937), and one for piano duet (1949) by Murrill. There is also a vocal adaptation by Arthur Sandford with words by Doris Arnold "That we may never fail" (1948), commissioned by the BBC for a gala variety concert in honour of the silver wedding of George VI and his wife.

== Later history ==
The march was played, as was a new work by Walton – Orb and Sceptre – at the coronation of Queen Elizabeth II in 1953. Crown Imperial was performed as a recessional piece at the wedding of Prince William and Catherine Middleton on 29 April 2011, and was among the music played in Westminster Abbey before the service for the coronation of King Charles III in May 2023.

The composer's autograph manuscript score is located at the Beinecke Rare Book and Manuscript Library at Yale University. The march is traditionally played each year as part of the university's commencement exercises.

== Recordings ==
- BBC Symphony Orchestra, Sir Adrian Boult, 1937
- Eastman Wind Ensemble, Frederick Fennell, 1958
- Royal Liverpool Philharmonic Orchestra, Sir Charles Groves, 1969
- Hallé Orchestra, and Band of the Royal Military School of Music, Kneller Hall, Sir John Barbirolli, 1969
- City of Birmingham Symphony Orchestra, Louis Frémaux, 1976
- London Philharmonic Orchestra, Sir Adrian Boult, 1977
- Cambridge Cooperative Band, Arthur Wills organ [arr. Wills], David Read, 1982
- Royal Philharmonic Orchestra, André Previn, 1987
- Philharmonia Orchestra, Sir David Willcocks, 1991
- Bournemouth Symphony Orchestra, Andrew Litton, 1995
- Black Dyke Mills Band [arr. Wright], James Watson, 1995
- Robert Gower (organ) [arr. Murrill], 1996
- London Philharmonic Orchestra, Sir Roger Norrington, 2000
- English Northern Philharmonia, Paul Daniel, 2001
- Band of the Scots Guards [arr. Duthoit], Major R. J. Owen, 2002

Source: Walton Trust.

== Notes, references and sources ==
=== Sources ===
- Cobbe, Hugh (2010) [2008]. Letters of Ralph Vaughan Williams. Oxford: Oxford University Press. ISBN 978-0-19-958764-3.
- Kennedy, Michael (1989). Portrait of Walton. Oxford: Oxford University Press. ISBN 978-0-19-816705-1.
- Lew, Douglas (2010). Great Composers in Watercolor. Bloomington: Trafford. ISBN 978-1-42-693437-7.
- Tierney, Neil (1984). William Walton: His Life and Music. London: Robert Hale. ISBN 978-0-70-901784-4.
