= Variations on a Theme by Hindemith =

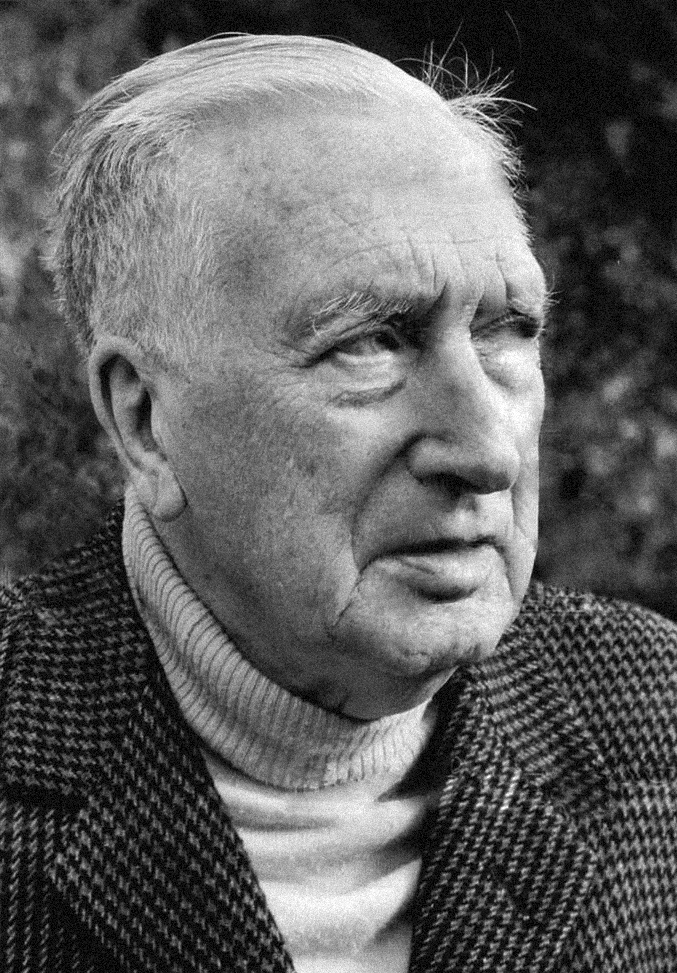
William Walton in 1976

William Walton's Variations on a Theme by Hindemith is an orchestral piece in eleven continuous sections, first performed in 1963. It is a tribute to Walton's friend and fellow composer Paul Hindemith.

== Background and first performances ==
William Walton's friendship with Paul Hindemith dated from 1923 when the two had met at the Salzburg Festival. In 1929 Hindemith did Walton a great service when he played the solo part in the premiere of the latter's Viola Concerto, stepping in at short notice to replace the intended soloist, Lionel Tertis, who had declined to play the piece. From the mid-1950s Walton contemplated a work to salute his friend, and a suitable opportunity arose in 1962, with a commission from the Royal Philharmonic Society in London for an orchestral work to celebrate its 150th anniversary on 8 March 1963. Walton chose to write a set of variations on a theme from Hindemith's 1940 Cello Concerto, and dedicated the work to the Hindemiths – Paul and his wife, Gertrud.

The work was first given at the Royal Festival Hall, London, by the Royal Philharmonic Orchestra, conducted by the composer. The concert was broadcast by the BBC, whose recording of it was published on CD in 1996. In North America the piece was taken up by George Szell, conductor of the Cleveland Orchestra, who performed it in the US and Canada to enthusiastic audiences, and made its first studio recording.

== Music ==
The work is scored for three flutes (one doubling piccolo), two oboes, one cor anglais, two clarinets, one bass clarinet, three bassoons (one doubling contrabassoon), four horns, three trumpets, three trombones, one tuba, timpani, side drum, bass drum, glockenspiel, cymbals, suspended cymbal, tambourine, triangle, xylophone, harp and strings. The playing time of the work is between 20 and 25 minutes.

The theme is from the opening of the slow movement of the Hindemith Cello Concerto, a slow lyrical passage marked Ruhig bewegt – moving peacefully. The critic Frank Howes comments that, unusually for a set of variations, the theme is not a short individual melody but 36 consecutive bars – "not a tune, nor even a theme, but a paragraph".

- Theme, Andante con moto

The work begins with a statement of the theme: Hindemith's cello theme unaltered but distributed between sections of the orchestra. Hindemith had been exploring serialism in his concerto, and Walton took the order of Hindemith's first twelve notes for the tonality of each of the variations.

- Variation 1. Vivace

This variation, flitting between multiple time signatures, is described by Howes as a scherzo.

- Variation 2. Allegramente

A fast-moving toccata with a syncopated rhythm on the horns.

- Variation 3. Larghetto

A siciliano section, led by the woodwinds.

- Variation 4. Moto perpetuo

Walton marks this variation "con slancio" – "dashingly".

- Variation 5. Andante con moto

This variation is led by the string section, later joined by the full orchestra; it follows the tempo of the original theme, and contains a musical cryptogram on "BACH" (B-flat – A – C – B natural).

- Variation 6. Scherzando

A range of effects for percussion and harp is the main feature of this variation.

- Variation 7. Lento molto

In this variation Walton introduces a quotation from Hindemith's opera Mathis der Maler that resembles a theme in the Cello Concerto. (Hindemith had evidently not noticed the resemblance until he heard Walton's Variations.)

- Variation 8. Vivacissimo

Palmer describes this variation as "lively, skittish", with chattering woodwind.

- Variation 9. Maestoso

This, brass-dominated, is the shortest section of the work – ten bars in length – and is described by Howes as "less a variation than a tremendous flourish for the fugal conclusion".

- Finale and coda. Allegro molto – A tempo primo, ma meno mosso

A fugal finale was a familiar characteristic of Walton, but this one is unconventional in the varying tonic intervals at which the fugal entries are introduced. After a diminuendo the variation moves into the coda, opened by the brass, followed by a cello solo leading to a quiet conclusion of the work.

== Critical reception ==
Hindemith was delighted with the Variations, and called the work "a half-hour of sheer enjoyment", and Walton said to Benjamin Britten in 1964 that he thought the piece one of his best. But in the early 1960s Walton was seen by some critics as old-fashioned, and reviews after the premiere included comments by Peter Heyworth and others to the effect that the piece contained nothing new.

Later, Walton's post-war music was widely re-evaluated, and the Variations have been highly regarded. The musical scholar Christopher Palmer has called the piece "perhaps the finest of all Walton's post-war orchestral works", the composer's biographer Michael Kennedy ranks it as one of Walton's finest works of any period of his career, and in 2017 the critic Robert Matthew-Walker called it "arguably Walton's most refined masterpiece":

… its expression not invariably discernible on the surface. The mastery demonstrated throughout is deeply impressive: here is control of structure, of pace, of emotional content, and an artistic maturity of expression without a bar's exaggeration.

== Recordings ==
| Orchestra | Conductor | Year |
|---|---|---|
| Royal Philharmonic Orchestra | Sir William Walton | 1963 |
| Cleveland Orchestra | George Szell | 1965 |
| Bournemouth Symphony Orchestra | Vernon Handley | 1988 |
| London Philharmonic Orchestra | Jan Latham-Koenig | 1992 |
| English Northern Philharmonia | Paul Daniel | 1996 |
| Bournemouth Symphony Orchestra | Andrew Litton | 2001 |
| BBC Scottish Symphony Orchestra | Martyn Brabbins | 2017 |

== See also ==
- List of variations on a theme by another composer

== References and sources ==
=== Sources ===
- Hayes, Malcolm (2002). The Selected Letters of William Walton. London: Faber & Faber. ISBN 978-0-571-20105-1.
- Howes, Frank (1973). The Music of William Walton (second ed.). London: Oxford University Press. ISBN 978-0-19-315431-5.
- Kennedy, Michael (1989). Portrait of Walton. Oxford: Oxford University Press. ISBN 978-0-19-816705-1.
