= Jill Gomez =

Trinidadian and British soprano (1942–2026)

- Gomez in the 1970s
- Born: Barbara Jill Gomez; 21 September 1942; New Amsterdam, British Guiana
- Died: 11 August 2026 (aged 83); United Kingdom
- Education: Royal Academy of Music; Guildhall School of Music and Drama
- Occupation: Operatic soprano
- Spouse: Patrick Carnegy, 15th Earl of Northesk

Jill Carnegy, Countess of Northesk (née Gomez; 21 September 1942 – 11 August 2026) was a Trinidadian and British soprano.

Trained in London in voice and piano from the age of 13, she began her career in 1968 with the Glyndebourne Festival as Adina in Donizetti's L'elisir d'amore, followed by Debussy's Mélisande and Cavalli's La Calisto over the next two years. She created the roles of Flora in Tippett's The Knot Garden at the Royal Opera House in London in 1970 and of the Countess in Thea Musgrave's The Voice of Ariadne at the 1974 Aldeburgh Festival. She appeared in lyric roles at several opera houses in the UK and Europe, including a production of Mozart's Lucio Silla at the Zürich Opera directed by Jean-Pierre Ponnelle and conducted by Nikolaus Harnoncourt. Her 1995 creation of the lead role of the Duchess of Argyll in Powder Her Face by Thomas Adès was particularly acclaimed and its original-cast recording was nominated for a Grammy Award.

Besides opera, she recorded as a soloist in choral-symphonic works, such as Mahler's Symphony No. 2 with the Israel Philharmonic conducted by Georg Solti, sang cantatas by Thomas Arne with Jaap Schröder, performed song cycles with chamber ensemble by Ravel and Webern conducted by Pierre Boulez, and recorded Spanish and French songs such as Canteloube's Chants d'Auvergne. An obituary in The Telegraph noted that she was "blessed with a sensuously beautiful and creamy voice".

== Life and career ==
Gomez was born on 21 September 1942 in New Amsterdam, British Guiana (now Guyana), to Albert Clyde Gomez, a Spanish Trinidadian, and Denise Price Gomez (née Denham). She grew up with a younger sister, Wendy, in Port of Spain, Trinidad and Tobago. Her father became managing director and vice-chairman of Angostura, the famous distillers, and her British mother was a well-known actress and broadcaster in Trinidad.

=== Education ===
After studying at St. Joseph's Convent in Port of Spain, Trinidad, and dominating at the islands' biennial Music Festival, Gomez moved to England at age 13 to study voice and piano at London's Royal Academy of Music and later the Guildhall School of Music and Drama, where her most important teacher was Walther Gruner. She said that he "knew more about lieder singing than anyone else"; he brought her to the Bayreuth Youth Festival. She successfully auditioned for the Glyndebourne Festival Chorus and performed with it from 1966 to 1968, winning the John Christie Award both latter years.

=== Opera ===
Gomez began her career at Glyndebourne in 1968 in her solo operatic debut as Adina in Donizetti's L'elisir d'amore with the Touring Opera. A reviewer from Opera magazine noted her "ease on the stage, possessing a sweet, well-produced (and well-trained) voice". It was followed the next year by Mélisande in Debussy's Pelléas et Mélisande on the main stage, alternating with Ileana Cotrubas, and in 1970 by the title role of Francesco Cavalli's La Calisto, conducted by Raymond Leppard. She appeared as Aminta in Mozart's Il re pastore at the Ledlanet Nights of Opera Scotland, also in 1968.

In 1970 Gomez created the role of Flora in Michael Tippett's The Knot Garden at the Royal Opera House in London, directed by Peter Hall and conducted by Colin Davis. This performance garnered headlines such as "topless for Tippett". She performed there also as Lisa in Bellini's La sonnambula, as Lauretta in Puccini's Gianni Schicchi and Tytania in Britten's A Midsummer Night's Dream. With Scottish Opera, she portrayed Mozart roles including Pamina in Die Zauberflöte, the Countess in Le nozze di Figaro as well as Leïla in Bizet's Les pêcheurs de perles, Anne Truelove in Stravinsky's The Rake's Progress, and Elisabeth in Henze's Elegy for Young Lovers. In 1973 she created the role of the Countess in Thea Musgrave's The Voice of Ariadne at the Aldeburgh Festival in 1974. She also appeared in productions by the English National Opera (ENO), including the Governess in Britten's The Turn of the Screw in the presence of the composer. She portrayed Cleopatra in Giulio Cesare at the Oper Frankfurt, with two boa constrictors on stage who were not as sleepy as the director had promised, Tatyana in Tchaikovsky's Eugene Onegin, the title role of Verdi's La traviata, Aminta in Il re pastore and Donna Anna in Mozart's Don Giovanni at the Kent Opera, Fiordiligi at the Grand Théâtre de Bordeaux, Massenet's Thaïs and Rosaura in Ermanno Wolf-Ferrari's La vedova scaltra at the Wexford Festival Opera, and Teresa in Benvenuto Cellini at the Berlioz Festival in Lyon. She worked closely with Jonathan Miller in La traviata for Kent Opera (Edinburgh Festival and UK tour) and for Eugene Onegin and The Turn of the Screw (with ENO).

Gomez was outspoken about the "international opera circus" and had no ambition to sing at the largest houses, preferring smaller venues such as Zürich Opera where sufficient rehearsal time was offered. She appeared there in Jean-Pierre Ponnelle's production of Mozart's Lucio Silla, conducted by Nikolaus Harnoncourt.

In 1995, Gomez created the lead role of the scandalous Duchess of Argyll in Powder Her Face by Thomas Adès, at the Cheltenham Music Festival. The recording of the production, with the original cast and the composer conducting, was nominated for a Grammy Award. Erik Eriksson wrote for AllMusic: "Gomez's portrayal is a tour de force, alternately opulent and unhinged. She achieves the difficult task of making a figure of ridicule into a person who evokes sympathy from the listener". She also took part in radio premieres, performing the title role of William Alwyn's Miss Julie in 1977, alongside Benjamin Luxon and Anthony Rolfe Johnson, conducted by Vilém Tauský. Alwyn was so pleased with her performance that he composed his song cycle Invocations for her. She also sang Prokofiev's Maddalena first on radio, in 1980.

=== Television and cabaret ===
Among many television appearances, Gomez sang Nanetta and Zerlina in the BBC2 programme Master Class, with the 80-year old Carl Ebert in 1967, and in the series Music Now produced by John Drummond in 1968–69. She was then first niece in the 1969 Culshaw/Large BBC production of Peter Grimes filmed at The Maltings. In 1976, she had a programme devoted to her in which she introduced and sang a recital of songs with John Constable, soprano soloist in A Child of Our Time in April 1977 on BBC2 conducted by Colin Davis, and soloist in Britten's War Requiem from Dresden Cathedral in 1980 under Herbert Kegel. Other TV and film credits include the French film Une Femme française, and television programmes A Ladies Knight! (1987), Rattle on Britten (1985) and a BBC programme Opera in Rehearsal of the second act of Le nozze di Figaro, with Anthony Besch (1973). She gave successful recitals devoted to cabaret music, some recorded.

=== Concert ===
In concert, Gomez was a soloist in Mahler's Symphony No. 2 with the Israel Philharmonic conducted by Solti. In 1977 she was a soloist for a tour of Germany of choir and orchestra of Academy of St Martin in the Fields in 1977. She sang cantatas by Thomas Arne with Jaap Schröder and Concerto Amsterdam. She performed and recorded song cycles for soprano and chamber ensemble, Ravel's Trois poèmes de Mallarmé and Anton Webern's Op. 13 and Op. 14, conducted by Pierre Boulez. She also sang and recorded songs, especially those of Spain and France, such as Canteloube's Chants d'Auvergne.

=== Personal life ===
In 2010 Gomez married her long-time partner Patrick Carnegy, 15th Earl of Northesk, a music producer and music critic who authored the book Wagner and the Art of Theatre in 2006. The couple lived in Cambridgeshire.

Gomez died from complications of dementia on 11 August 2026, aged 83.

== Recordings ==
By composer:

- Adès, Thomas – Powder Her Face, Almeida Ensemble, conductor Thomas Adès. EMI Classics 7243 5 56649 2 OCLC 63557167
- Alwyn, William
  - Miss Julie (title role), Philharmonia Orchestra, conductor Vilém Tauský Lyrita SRCD2218 OCLC 906566058
  - Invocations, song cycle, John Constable, piano, CHAN 9220 OCLC 30350166
- Britten
  - A Midsummer Night's Dream (Helena), City of London Sinfonia, conductor Richard Hickox. OCLC 247267371
  - Les Illuminations, Endymion Ensemble, conductor John Whitfield. EMI Classics 95579 OCLC 1294861129
- Canteloube – Songs of the Auvergne, Royal Liverpool Philharmonic Orchestra, conductor Vernon Handley. awarded a Rosette in the Penguin Guide to CDs and DVDs. EMI Eminence – CD-EMX 9500 OCLC 638045262
- Donizetti – Il giovedì grasso, Radio Teflis Eireann Symphony Orchestra, conductor David Atherton. Foyer Cat: 1-CF 2036: Memories Cat: HR 4482
- De Falla – The Three-Cornered Hat, Philharmonia Orchestra, conductor Yan Pascal Tortelier. CHAN8904 OCLC 971996480
- Fauré – Pelléas et Mélisande, Rotterdam Philharmonic Orchestra, conductor David Zinman. Philips 464701 OCLC 909171555
- Handel – Admeto (Antigone), Milan Baroque Ensemble, conductor Alan Curtis. EMI IC 163-30 808/ 12 (five LPs, 1980)
- Handel – Acis and Galatea (Galatea), Academy of St Martin in the Fields, conductor Neville Marriner. Argo ZRG 886–887 OCLC 4852225
- Hoddinott, Alun – Sinfonia Fidei, Stuart Burrows, Philharmonia Orchestra and Chorus, conductor Charles Groves. Lyrita 332 OCLC 38037841
- Matthews, David
  - Cantiga, Bournemouth Sinfonietta, conductor John Carewe. – NMC 84 OCLC 811455439
  - Notturni ed alba, City of Birmingham Symphony Orchestra, conductor Louis Frémaux. EMI Studio 63176 OCLC 48152323
- Monteverdi – Vespro della Beata Vergine, Monteverdi Choir, Philip Jones Brass Ensemble, Monteverdi Orchestra, conductor John Eliot Gardiner. Decca 443482 OCLC 1385344420
- Mozart
  - Don Giovanni (Elvira, in German), Orchestra of the Ludwigsburg Festival, conductor Wolfgang Gönnenwein OCLC 725679324
  - Songs, John Constable, piano. SAGA 5441 LP OCLC 869022919
- Nielsen - Symphony No.3, London Symphony Orchestra, conductor Ole Schmidt, Unicorn Records Ltd RHS 324-330m (1974)
- Pergolesi – Stabat Mater, Eufoda 1036 / 6803 143 LP OCLC 19257070
- Poulenc – Dialogues des Carmélites, Hilversum Radio Orchestra, conductor Henry Lewis. KRO.
- Ravel – Trois poèmes de Mallarmé, BBC Symphony Orchestra, conductor Pierre Boulez. CBS M39023 OCLC 874077853
- Tippett – The Knot Garden, Orchestra of the Royal Opera House, conductor Colin Davis. Philips 6700 063 OCLC 733092569
- Villa-Lobos – Bachianas Brasileiras (No 5: Suite for Voice and Violin), Anthony Pleeth, Cello Octet, conductor Peter Manning. Hyperion 66257 OCLC 874344222
- Walton
  - A Song for the Lord Mayor's Table (Songs after Edith Sitwell), City of London Sinfonia, Richard Hickox CHAN8824 OCLC 875687484

Collections:

- Cabaret Classics: 17 songs by Weill, Zemlinsky, Schoenberg and Satie, John Constable, piano. Unicorn-Kanchana OCLC 19952685
- Songs by Bizet, Berlioz and Debussy, John Constable, piano. LP SAGA 5388 OCLC 1011496128
- A Spanish Songbook, songs by Fernando Obradors, Miguel de Fuenllana, Schumann, Ravel, Walton, Roberto Gerhard, Enrique Granados, Hugo Wolf, Graciano Tarragó, Léo Delibes, Bizet, Anonymous, Jesús Guridi. John Constable, piano. 1994, Conifer Classics CDCF 243 OCLC 841891731
- South of the Border ... down Mexico way (The Lady in Red by Allie Wrubel; Begin the Beguine Cole Porter; Peanut Vendor Moisés Simons; Perfida Alberto Domínguez; The Carioca Vincent Youmans; Amor, Amor, Amor Gabriel Ruiz; Orchids in the moonlight Youmans; Cielito Lindo Pablo Santos; Nina from Argentina Noël Coward; Poinciana Nat Simon; La Cucaracha traditional; La Paloma Sebastián de Iradier; Flying down to Rio Youmans) The Markham and Nettle Piano Duo, National Philharmonic Orchestra, conductor Barry Wordsworth, Hyperion. OCLC 1483670130

== Sources ==
- Warrack, John and West, Ewan (1992), The Oxford Dictionary of Opera, 782 pages, ISBN 0-19-869164-5
