= Invocations (Alwyn) =

- Song cycle by William Alwyn
- Text: poems by Michael Armstrong
- Language: English
- Composed: 1977
- Dedication: Jill Gomez
- Scoring: soprano; piano

Invocations is an English-language song cycle, composed for soprano and piano by William Alwyn in 1977, setting texts by Michael Armstrong. The composer dedicated the work to soprano Jill Gomez.

== History ==
William Alwyn composed Invocations for the soprano Jill Gomez after she had performed the title role of his opera Miss Julie in its premiere as a BBC Radio 3 broadcast on 16 July 1977, alongside tenor Anthony Rolfe Johnson, conducted by Vilém Tauský. Alwyn also composed a song cycle for her colleague, A Leave-taking.

Alwyn set texts by his friend Michael Armstrong related to love and nature, completing the composition on 12 December 1977. The cycle has seven songs:

1. Through the Centuries
2. Holding the Night
3. Separation
4. Drought
5. Spring Rain
6. Invocation to the Queen of Moonlight
7. Our Magic Horse.

Some of the songs have nocturnal character. A reviewer for The Guardian described the music as "quietly eloquent and evocative".

Invocations was published by HeBu Musikverlag. The duration is given as 20 minutes.

== Recordings ==
Invocations was recorded by Gomez with pianist John Constable, coupled with the song cycle A Leave-taking that Alwyn composed for Rolfe Johnson. Another recording was made in 2006, in a collection of five song cycles by Alwyn, performed by Elin Manahan Thomas and pianist Iain Burnside.
