= Ian Venables =

British composer

Ian Venables (born 1955) is a British composer of art songs and chamber music.

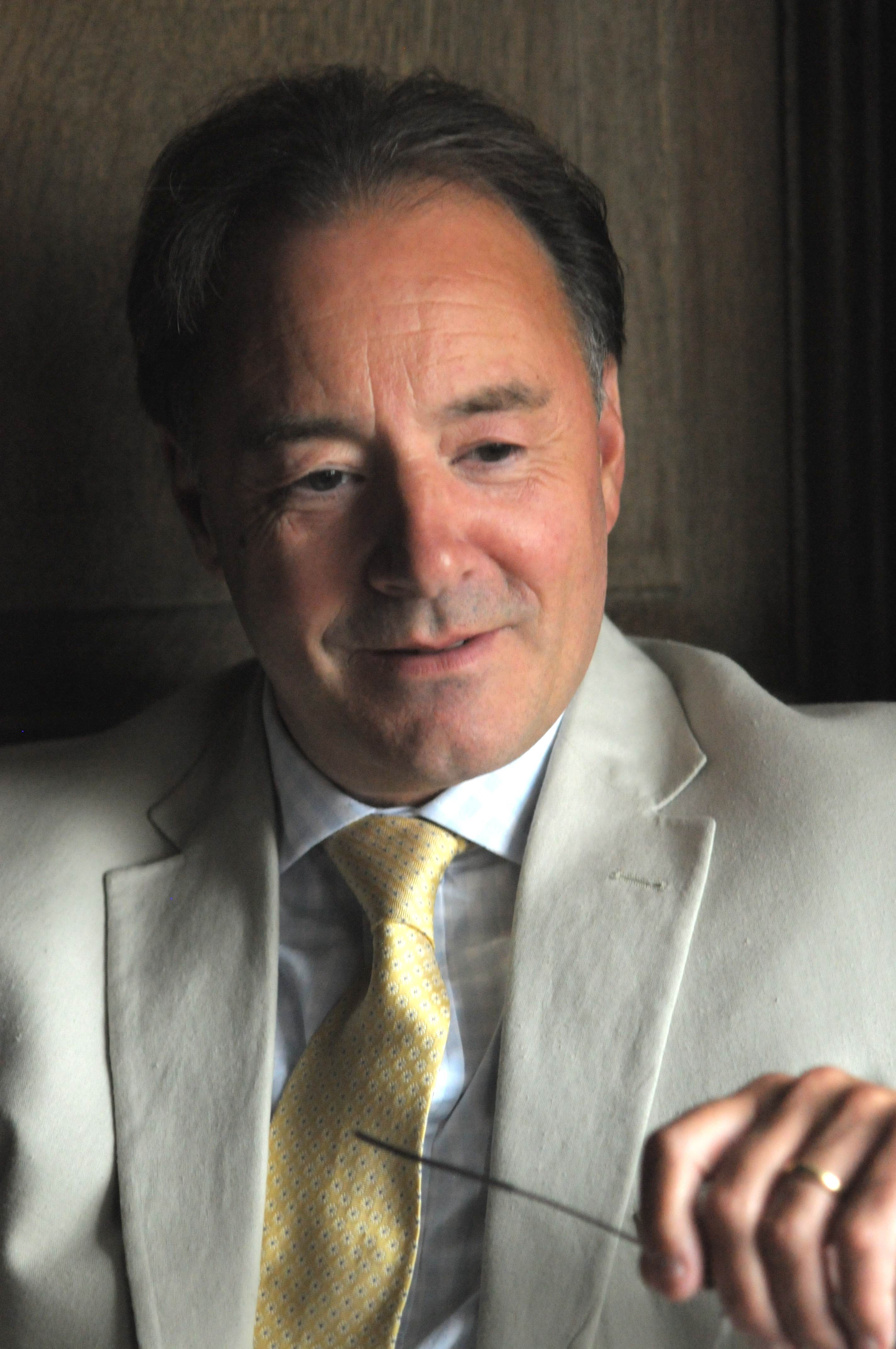
Ian Venables -Composer

== Biography ==
Ian Venables was born in Liverpool in 1955 and was educated at Liverpool Collegiate Grammar School. He studied music with Richard Arnell at the Trinity College of Music, and later with Andrew Downes, John Mayer, and John Joubert at the Royal Birmingham Conservatoire.

His compositions encompass many genres, and, in particular, he has added significantly to the canon of English art song. Described as "one of the finest song composers of his generation," he has written over eighty works in this genre, which include eleven song-cycles: Venetian Songs – Love’s Voice, Op.22 (1995) and Invite to Eternity for tenor and string quartet, Op.31 (1997), both recorded; Songs of Eternity and Sorrow for tenor, string quartet, and piano, Op.36 (2004); On the Wings of Love for tenor, clarinet, and piano, Op.38 (2006); The Pine Boughs Past Music for baritone and piano, Op.39 (2010); Remember This, Op.40, (2011); The Song of the Severn for baritone, string quartet, and piano, Op.43 (2013); Through These Pale Cold Days for tenor, viola and piano Op.46 (2016); The Last Invocation for tenor and piano, Op.50 (2018); Portraits of a Mind for tenor, string quartet, and piano, Op.54 (2022); Out of the Shadows for baritone, violin, 'cello and piano, Op.55 (2023); The Wreaths of Time for tenor and string quartet, Op.57 (2025); Other songs for solo voice and piano include Two Songs, Op.28 (1997) and Six Songs, Op.33 (1999–2003), A Dramatic Scena – At the Court of the Poisoned Rose for counter-tenor and piano, Op. 20 (1994).

His songs have been performed by national and internationally acclaimed artists that include: Roderick Williams, James Gilchrist, Patricia Rozario, Andrew Kennedy, Ian Partridge, Allan Clayton, Caroline MacPhie, Mary Bevan, Brian Thorsett, Susan Bickley, Benjamin Hulett, Sally Porter Munro, Benjamin Appl, Geraldine McGreevy, Alessandro Fisher, Nicky Spence, Daniel Norman, Howard Wong, Nathan Vale, Michael Lampard, Peter Savidge, Kevin McLean-Mair, Mary Plazas, Peter Wilman, Nicholas Mulroy, Nick Pritchard, Elizabeth Atherton, Kristian Sorensen and Ciara Hendrick.

His many chamber works include the Piano Quintet, Op.27 (1995), described by Roderic Dunnett in The Independent as "lending a new late 20th Century dimension to the English pastoral," and the String Quartet, Op.32 (1998), as well as smaller pieces for solo instruments and piano. He has also written works for choir including the Requiem, Op.48, the anthem O God Be Merciful Op.51, Awake, Awake, the World is Young, Op.34, and the Rhapsody for organ, Op.25 (1996). There are two recordings of the Requiem

He is an acknowledged expert on the 19th century poet and literary critic John Addington Symonds, and apart from having set five of his poems for voice and piano, he has contributed a significant essay to the book John Addington Symonds: Culture and the Demon Desire (Macmillan Press Ltd, 2000).

He is President of the Arthur Bliss Society, a Vice-president of the Gloucester Music Society, and Chairman of the Ivor Gurney Society. His continuing work on the music of Gurney has led to 2003 orchestrations of two of his songs, counterparts to two that by Herbert Howells, and newly edited versions of Gurney's War Elegy (1919) and A Gloucestershire Rhapsody (1921), with Philip Lancaster. His works have been recorded on the Signum, Somm, Regent and Naxos, and Delphian CD labels.

His music is published by Novello & Co (Wise Music Group).

== Works list ==
Chamber music

- Elegy for cello and piano, Op. 2 (1981)
- Elegy (arr. for viola and piano), Op. 2a (1987)
- Three Pieces for violin and piano, Op. 11 (1986)
- Diversions for brass quintet, (jazz ensemble) Op. 13 (1992)
- Sonatina for oboe and piano, Op. 14 (1995)
- Three Bridges Suite for brass decet (jazz ensemble), Op. 18 (1994)
- Triptych for sixteen brass and two percussion, Op. 21 (1993)
- Sonata for flute (or violin) and piano, Op. 23 (1989) and transcription for violin and piano (2018)
- Soliloquy for viola and piano, Op. 26 (1994)
- Piano Quintet Op. 27 (1989–1996)
- Poem for cello and piano, Op. 29 (1997)
- String Quartet Op. 32 (1997–1998)
- The Moon Sails Out for cello and piano, Op. 42 (2010)
- It Rains (arr for cello and piano), Op. 33a (2016)
- At Malvern (arr for cello and piano), Op. 24a (2016)
- In Memoriam I.B.G (arr for cello and piano), Op. 39, No 4a (2016)
- Canzonetta for Clarinet and String Quartet Op. 44 (2013)

Organ

- Rhapsody for organ, Op. 25 (1996)

Piano

- Sonata (1975) In Memoriam D.S.C.H Op. 1 (revised 1984)
- The Stourhead Follies Four Romantic Impressions Op. 4 (1985)
- Three Short Pieces Op. 5 (1986)
- Impromptu The Nightingale and the Rose Op. 8 (1996)
- Portrait of Janis Op. 9 (2000) and an arrangement for 12 string instruments (2019)
- Caprice Op. 35 (2001)

Choral

- O Sing Aloud to God, Anthem for S.A.T.B and organ, Op. 19 (1993)
- Awake! awake, the world is young, Anthem for chorus, mezzo-soprano, brass, percussion and organ, (with optional strings) Op.34 (1999)
- While shepherds watched their flocks by night, Carol for S.A.T.B and organ, (2001)
- Requiem Op. 48 for S.A.T.B and organ, (2020)
- Requiem Op. 48a for S.A.T.B and Orchestra (2021)
- God Be Merciful Op.51 for S.A.T.B and organ, (2021)
- God Be Merciful Op.51a for S.A.T.B, organ and string orchestra (2021)
- Versicles and Responses for S.A.T.B and organ, (2022)
- A Choral Wedding Blessing for S.A.T.B choir, (2023)
- The Song of Solomon Op.52 for S.A.T.B choir, (2023)
- The Song of Solomon Op.52 for S.A.T.B and organ, (2023)
- Magnificat and Nunc Dimittis for S.A.T.B and organ, (2024)
- A Christmas Lullaby, Carol for S.A.T.B Choir, (2025)

Vocal

- Midnight Lamentation for voice and piano, Op. 6 (1974); words by Harold Monro
- Pain for voice and piano, Op. 10 (1991); words by Ivor Gurney
- A Kiss for voice and piano or string quartet, Op. 15 (1992); words by Thomas Hardy
- Easter Song for voice and piano, Op. 16 (1992); words by Edgar Billingham
- At the Court of the Poisoned Rose for voice and piano, Op. 20 (1994); words by Marion Angus
- Love's Voice – Four Venetian Songs, song cycle for tenor and piano, Op. 22 (1995); words by John Addington Symonds

1. Fortunate Isles
2. The Passing Stranger
3. Invitation to the Gondola (also for baritone and piano)
4. Love's Voice

- At Malvern for voice and piano, Op. 24 (1998); words by John Addington Symonds
- Flying Crooked and At Midnight for voice and piano or string quartet, Op. 28 (1997–1998); words by Robert Graves and Edna St. Vincent Millay
- Acton Burnell for tenor, viola and piano, Op. 30 (1997); words by Rennie Parker
- Invite to Eternity, song cycle for tenor and string quartet, Op. 31 (1997); words by John Clare

1. Born upon an Angel's Breast
2. An Invite to Eternity
3. Evening Bells
4. I am

- Six Songs for voice and piano, Op. 33 (1999–2003); words by Jennifer Andrews, Edward Thomas, Ernest Dowson, Charles Bennett, Alfred, Lord Tennyson and Theodore Roethke

1. The Way Through
2. It Rains
3. Vitae summa brevis
4. The November Piano
5. Break, break, break
6. The Hippo (also for voice and string quartet)

- Songs of Eternity and Sorrow, song cycle for tenor, string quartet and piano, Op. 36 (2003); words by A. E. Housman

1. Easter Hymn
2. When Green Buds Hang
3. Oh, Who is That Young Sinner
4. Because I Liked You Better

- Songs of Eternity and Sorrow, song cycle arranged for tenor and piano, Op. 36a (2005)
- Songs for soprano and piano, Op. 37 (2004, 2008); words by John Clare, Elizabeth Jennings and Robert Nichols

1. Love Lives Beyond
2. Friendship
3. Aurelia

- On the Wings of Love, six songs for tenor, clarinet and piano, Op. 38 (2006); words by Constantine P. Cavafy, Federico García Lorca, Jean de Sponde, Emperor Hadrian, Robert Frost and W. B. Yeats

1. Ionian Song
2. The Moon Sails Out
3. Sonnets of Love, No XI
4. Animula Vagula, Blandula
5. Reluctance
6. When You Are Old

- The Pine Boughs Past Music, song cycle for baritone and piano, Op. 39 (2009); words by Ivor Gurney and Leonard Clark

1. The Wind
2. Soft Rain
3. My Heart Makes Songs on Lonely Roads
4. In Memoriam – Ivor Gurney

- Remember This, Cantata for soprano, tenor, string quartet, piano Op. 40 (2008–2011); words by Andrew Motion
- Eight Songs for baritone or mezzo-soprano and piano, Op. 41 (2011–); words by Philip Larkin, Geoffrey Scott, Francis William Bourdillon, Galway Kinnell, Walter de la Mare, James Joyce, John Masefield, W.B.Yeats

1. Frutta di mare
2. The Night Has a Thousand Eyes
3. In a Palor Containing a Table
4. Cut Grass
5. Little Old Cupid
6. Chamber Music III
7. On Eastnor Knoll
8. What Then?

- The Song of the Severn, song cycle for baritone, string quartet and piano, Op. 43 (2013); words by John Masefield, A.E. Housman, John Drinkwater and Philip Worner

1. On Malvern Hill
2. How Clear, How Lovely Bright
3. Elgar's Music
4. Laugh And Be Merry
5. The River In December

- The Song of the Severn, song cycle for baritone and symphony orchestra, Op. 43a (2022), orchestrated by Vincent Onken
- I caught the changes of the year, song for soprano and piano, Op. 45 (2011); words by John Drinkwater
- Through These Pale Cold Days, song cycle for tenor, viola and piano, Op.46 (2016); words by Wilfred Owen, Francis St Vincent Morris, Isaac Rosenberg, Siegfried Sassoon and Geoffrey Anketell Studdert Kennedy

1. The Send Off
2. Procrastination
3. Through These Pale Cold Days
4. Suicide In The Trenches
5. If You Forget

- Ask Nothing More of Me, song for soprano and piano, Op. 47 (2018); words by Algernon Charles Swinburne
- The Last Invocation, song cycle for tenor and piano, Op. 50 (2019); words by Walt Whitman

1. Shine, Shine, Shine!
2. Out of May's Shows Selected
3. As At Thy Portals Also Death
4. The Last Invocation

- Hermes Trismegistus, Dramatic Scena for soprano, viola and piano Op.53 (2022); words by Henry Wadsworth Longfellow
- Portraits of a Mind, song cycle for tenor, string quartet and piano, Op. 54 (2022); words by George Meredith, Ursula Vaughan Williams, Robert Louis Stevenson, Christina Rossetti and Walt Whitman

1. The Lark Ascending
2. Man Makes Delight His Own
3. From A Railway Carriage
4. Echo
5. A Clear Midnight

- Out of the Shadows, song cycle for baritone, violin, 'cello and piano, Op. 55 (2023); words by Constantine Cavafy, Horatio Brown, John Addington Symonds and Edward Percy Warren

1. At the Café Door
2. Bored
3. The Mirror in the Hall
4. Dark House
5. Love's Olympian Laughter
6. Body and Soul

- Out of the Shadows, song cycle for baritone and orchestra, Op. 55a (2023)
- The Singer , song for soprano, viola and piano, Op.56 (2024); words by John Addington Symonds
- The Wreaths of Time, song cycle for tenor, and String Quartet, Op. 57 (2025); words by Ralph Waldo Emerson, Herman Melville, Edna St.Vincent Millay, Georgina Douglas Johnson, Ogden Nash, Todd S.J Lawson, Langston Hughes

1. Concord Hymnn
2. Misgivings
3. To Inez Milholland
4. Old Black Men
5. No Doctor's Today, Thank You
6. In Memoriam
7. Hold Fast To Dreams

== Ivor Gurney ==
Ian Venables is the Chairman of the Ivor Gurney Society and a trustee of the Ivor Gurney Estate. He is currently working on behalf of the Trust to edit for publication some previously unpublished works by Gurney.
