= David Willison (pianist) =

English pianist

David Willison (born 13 February 1936) is an English pianist. Between 1961 and 1999 he was the regular accompanist of the baritone Benjamin Luxon in recitals and recordings.

David Willison's earliest performing experience was in the piano trio formed with his brothers John, a violinist and Peter, cellist. This group played nationwide for several years, and performed a series of Wigmore Hall concerts.

Willison studied at the Royal Academy of Music, and after winning the first London Accompanying Scholarship, at the Guildhall School of Music and Drama. He met Benjamin Luxon in 1961 while they were both students at the Guildhall. Their partnership began almost immediately with recitals, the first of their many live broadcasts for the BBC taking place in 1965. Their performances (more than 700) were heard in every British Festival and as far afield as Japan and in concert halls throughout Britain, Europe and the USA. They recorded for Argo, Decca and Chandos with a repertoire from Beethoven, Schubert, Wolf and a major part of the English song repertoire.

The association between Luxon and Willison was brought to an end by the hearing loss which ended Luxon's singing career in the late 1990s.

Over the years Willison established additional artistic associations: with the violinist Ralph Holmes; the flautist James Galway; the Hungarian cellist Thomas Igloi; the mezzo-soprano Felicity Palmer; and the soprano Rita Streich. A significant recital and broadcasting partnership was also forged with the tenor Anthony Rolfe Johnson; this resulted in a number of recordings of English song.

On the recommendation of Gerald Moore, Willison was invited by Dame Elisabeth Schwarzkopf to be her recital partner; the two appeared together on many occasions throughout the 1970s, in such locations as Bucharest, Milan (La Scala) and Pisa, as well as at English festivals.

Latterly, David Willison has performed with John Barrow, Robert Tear, Dame Felicity Lott, Neil Jenkins, Thomas Allen, Christopher Maltman and Howard Wong.

Before his retirement, David Willison was for fifteen years a Professor of Piano Chamber Music at the Royal Academy of Music. He was a Director of music publishers Alfred Lengnick & Co. for 35 years.

== Discography ==
- Warlock: Songs—Benjamin Luxon, David Willison (Chandos CHAN8643)
- Schubert: Schwanengesang—Benjamin Luxon, David Willison (Chandos CHAN8721)
- Schubert: Die Schone Mullerin—Benjamin Luxon, David Willison (Chandos CHAN8725)
- Quilter: Songs—Benjamin Luxon, David Willison (Chandos CHAN8782)
- Schubert: Winterreise—Benjamin Luxon, David Willison (Chandos CHAN8815)
- Butterworth, Gurney: Songs—Benjamin Luxon, David Willison (Chandos CHAN8831)
- Various: Songs of the Sea – Luxon, Willison (Abbey LPB 689)
- Vaughan Williams: Songs – Anthony Rolfe Johnson, Willison (Polydor 2460 236) reissued on EMI Classics CZS 5 74785 2
- Butterworth, Gurney, Ireland, Warlock: Songs – A. Rolfe Johnson, Willison (Polydor 2460 258) reissued on EMI Classics CZS 5 74785 2
- Hugo Wolf: Mörike Lieder - Luxon, Willison (Argo 3BBA 1008-10)
- Break the news to mother: Victorian & Edwardian Ballads - Luxon, Willison (Argo ZK 42) reissued on British Music Collection, Decca 475 047-2
- Various: Lieder Recital – Luxon, Willison (Argo ZRG 925)
- Various: Victorian Ballads – Luxon, Willison (Argo ZFB 95-6)
- Mussorgsky: Songs – Luxon, Willison (ZRG 708)
- William Alwyn: Song Cycle – Luxon, Willison (Lyrita SRCS 61) reissued on Lyrita SRCD 293
- Alwyn: Piano Quartet – Quartet of London, Willison (Chandos ABRD 1153)
- Camilleri: Music for Piano – Willison (Bedivere BVR317)
- Various: Miniature Masterpieces for Piano – Willison (Classical Elegance LSC123)
- Various: Songs – A Rolfe Johnson, Willison (IMP Classics 30367 02032)
- Various: Parlour Songs – Luxon, Willison (Omega OCD 3006)
- Butterworth & Finzi: Songs – Luxon, Willison (Argo ZRG 838)
- Finzi: Songs – Luxon, Willison (Decca; British Music Coll. 468 807-2)
- Quilter: Songs – Luxon, Willison (Decca; British Music Coll. 470 195-2)
- Vaughan Williams: Songs – Luxon, Willison (Chandos ABRD 1186 & CHAN 8475)
- Butterworth & Gurney: Songs – Luxon, Willison (Chandos CHAN 8831)
- Quilter: Songs – Luxon, Willison (Chandos CHAN 8782)
- Elgar & Delius: Songs – Luxon, Willison (Chandos ABRD 1247 & CHAN 8539)
- Britten: Song Cycles – Luxon, Willison (Chandos 1224 & CHAN 8514)
- Warlock: Songs – Luxon, Willison (Chandos ABRD 1329 & CHAN 8643)
- Schubert: Schwanengesang – Luxon, Willison (Chandos ABRD 1361 & CHAN 8721) reissued on Chandos Classics CHAN 10042
- Schubert: Die schöne Müllerin – Luxon, Willison (Chandos ABRD 1365 & CHAN 8725)
- Schubert: Die Winterreise – Luxon, Willison (Chandos CHAN 8815)
- Various; British Folk Songs – Luxon, Willison (Chandos CHAN 8946)
