= Tafelmusik =

Form of 16th-century entertainment music

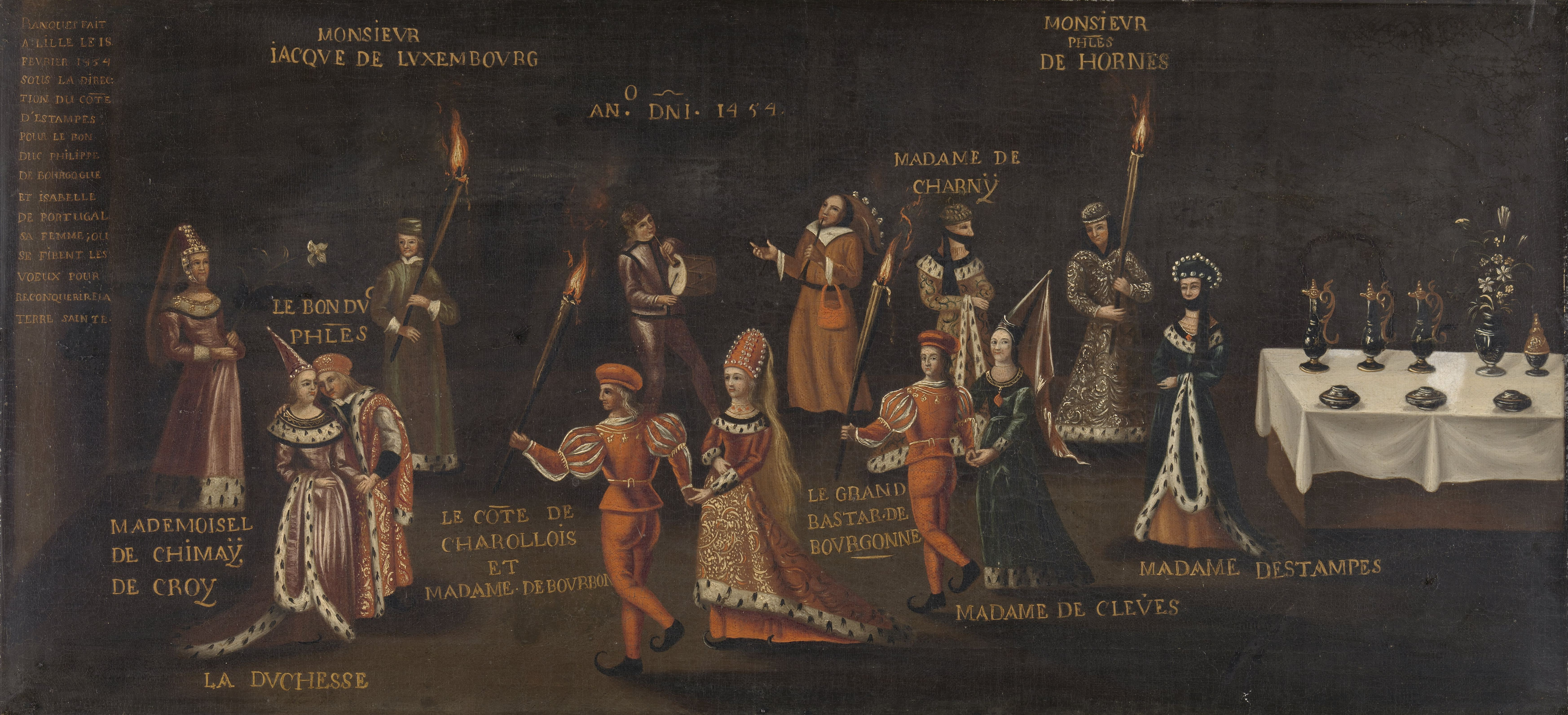
Depiction of a banquet, Rijksmuseum in Amsterdam

Tafelmusik (German: literally, "table-music") is a term used since the mid-16th century for music played at feasts and banquets. Table music could be either instrumental, vocal, or both. As might be expected, it was often of a somewhat lighter character than music for other occasions. In solemn banquets, starting with wedding dinners, the presence of singers and instrumentalists is customary and almost obligatory.

== Origin ==
The custom of accompanying banquets and symposia with music has been attested by ancient Egyptian, Hebrew, Greek and the Romans in Roman temples.

The term was often used as a title for collections of music, some of which were intended to be used at banquets as a musical background, or during outdoor events. The tradition lasts in the Middle Ages and takes on new vigor in the 15th century. The short compositions of Gioachino Rossini, a composer who also gained fame as a gourmet, titled "antipasto" and "dessert" are recognized as related to "table music".

== Practice ==
At solemn meals, beginning with wedding banquets, the presence of singers and musicians was common and almost obligatory: the same happened at the official banquets of the court and municipal magistracies. During the seventeenth and eighteenth centuries, especially in Germany and France, the style seduced composers until it was characterized as a true musical genre, in the form of a dance suite. For example, the lutenist and harpist of the Palatine Concert in Bologna is assigned the “task of charming, with delicate instrumental dances, the ears of illustrious guests during lunch” and dinner.

Table music was displaced in the late 18th century by the divertimento, and its importance soon diminished, but it was revived and partially restored in the vocal genre of the Liedertafel by Carl Friedrich Zelter beginning in 1809, and male-voice choral societies describing themselves by this name continued the practice until the mid-20th century.

== Composers ==
Some of the most significant composers of table music included Johann Hermann Schein, whose Banchetto musicale of 1617 acquired considerable fame, and Michael Praetorius, who wrote about the phenomenon of Tafelmusik in his Syntagma musicum of 1619. Music from Schein's collection is still performed by early music ensembles with some regularity.

The Tafelmusik or Musique de Table by Georg Philipp Telemann is among his celebrated music collections.
