= A Song for the Lord Mayor's Table =

Song cycle by William Walton

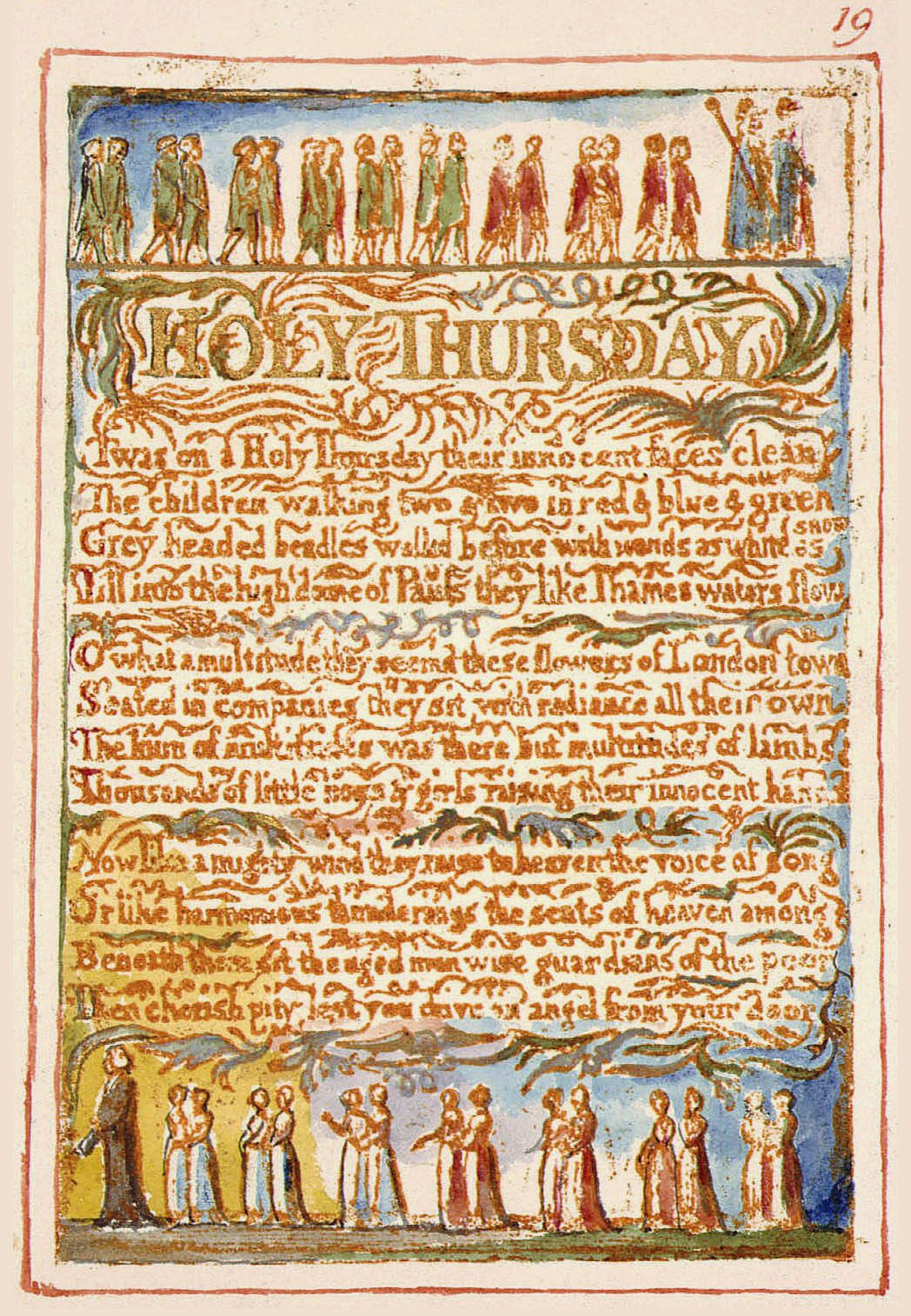
William Blake's illustration of his verse "Holy Thursday", the fourth song in the cycle

A Song for the Lord Mayor's Table is a cycle of six songs with music by William Walton, first performed in 1962. The words, chosen by the librettist Christopher Hassall, are by six different British poets, two of them anonymous. Originally for soprano and piano, the cycle was later orchestrated. The work was premiered at Goldsmiths' Hall, London on 18 July 1962 by Elisabeth Schwarzkopf and Gerald Moore, during the City of London Festival. The orchestral version was first performed at the Mansion House, London on 7 July 1970, by Janet Baker with the English Chamber Orchestra conducted by George Malcolm.

== Background and first performances ==
The cycle was commissioned by the Worshipful Company of Goldsmiths as a contribution to the first City of London Festival. At Walton's request, Christopher Hassall, who had written the libretto for the composer's opera Troilus and Cressida, selected six poems to be set. The oldest is "The Lord Mayor's Table" by the 17th-century English poet Thomas Jordan, and the other five are by 18th- or 19th-century poets – Charles Morris, William Blake, William Wordsworth, and two anonymous authors.

Walton composed the cycle at his home in Ischia in the first half of 1962. He was not a pianist, and found writing for the instrument irksome. He told his publisher that the first song in particular needed an orchestra. The soloist at the first performance was Elisabeth Schwarzkopf, whose voice Walton had in mind when composing the music for Cressida in his opera. She was an accomplished linguist and according to Gerald Moore, who played the piano at the premiere, she sang the songs "as if she were an Englishwoman".

Walton orchestrated the cycle in 1970, and this version was first performed on 7 July of that year, by Janet Baker with the English Chamber Orchestra conducted by George Malcolm. The venue for the premiere – most appropriately, The Times commented – was the Mansion House, the Lord Mayor of London's official residence.

== Structure ==
=== 1. The Lord Mayor's Table ===
The verse is by the 18th–19th century English poet Thomas Jordan, praising London's wealth and luxury. The opening stanza is:

Let all the Nine Muses lay by their abuses,
Their railing and drolling on tricks of the Strand,
To pen us a ditty in praise of the City,
Their treasure, and pleasure, their pow'r and command.

The music critic and biographer Michael Kennedy writes "Walton excelled in ceremonial works of this kind ... the Walton of the Coronation marches is not far away in this description of a Lord Mayor's banquet, with corks popping in thirds.

=== 2. Glide gently ===
The second song is a setting of an early poem by Wordsworth, "Remembrance of Collins" (1789). It opens:

Glide gently, thus for ever, ever glide,
O Thames! that other bards may see
As lovely visions by thy side
As now, fair river! come to me.

The critic Stanley Sadie described Walton's setting as "suave and lyrical music, full of Brittenish tonal side-slips". Kennedy considers it "the gem of the cycle, a beautiful and imaginative evocation of the Thames".

=== 3. Wapping Old Stairs ===
The lyric for this song is by an unknown writer, although it is sometimes erroneously attributed to Thackeray. (Note: The misunderstanding probably arises because the anonymous verse was included in George Saintsbury's much-reprinted edition of Thackeray's verse to accompany Thackeray's two parodies of it.) It is a wry complaint from a not-too-heartbroken young woman about being jilted by a sailor. It begins:

Your Molly has never been false, she declares,
Since last time we parted at Wapping Old Stairs,
When I swore that I still would continue the same,
And gave you the 'bacco box, marked with your name.

In this song, Sadie finds the piano version with its "simple monochrome accompaniment" (with a time signature of one minim per bar) preferable to the orchestral.

=== 4. Holy Thursday ===
The fourth song has words by Blake, from Songs of Innocence (1789). "Holy Thursday" depicts a charity service for children in St Paul's Cathedral. It begins

Twas on a holy Thursday, their innocent faces clean,
The children walking two and two, in red and blue and green:
Grey-headed beadles walked before, with wands as white as snow,
Till into the high dome of St Paul's they like Thames waters flow.

Kennedy comments that in this song Walton uses a different figuration for each of the three stanzas. Sadie remarked on the music's "grey and grave sonorities". He was not certain that the orchestral version of this song was an improvement on "concentration and intimacy" of the piano original.

=== 5. The Contrast ===
Morris's poem, dating from 1798, is a humorous complaint by a confirmed city-dweller about the slow pace of life in the countryside. It begins

In London I never knew what I'd be at,
Enraptured with this, and enchanted by that,
I'm wild with the sweets of variety's plan,
And life seems a blessing too happy for man.

But the country, Lord help me!, sets all matters right,
So calm and composing from morning to night;
Oh! it settles the spirit when nothing is seen
But an ass on a common, a goose on a green.

Kennedy comments on Walton's staccato accompaniment to patter in this song and the contrasting "sustained chords and sheepbells of rural peace".

=== 6. Rhyme ===
The cycle ends with the children's song "Oranges and Lemons" in an 18th-century version that has, as Sadie observes, "several verses unknown in most nurseries". Kennedy describes the song as "a merry cadenza of bell chimes, beginning at St Clement's".

== Recordings ==
The original version has been recorded by Heather Harper and Paul Hamburger (L'Oiseau-Lyre); Sarah Walker (Hyperion); and Felicity Lott and Graham Johnson (Naxos). The orchestral version has been recorded by Jill Gomez with the City of London Sinfonia conducted by Richard Hickox. A live performance at the Last Night of the Proms in 1973 was recorded and released on LP, featuring Elizabeth Bainbridge and the BBC Symphony Orchestra conducted by Colin Davis.

== Notes, references and sources ==
=== Sources ===
- Kennedy, Michael (1989). Portrait of Walton. Oxford: Oxford University Press. ISBN 978-0-19-816705-1.
- Lloyd, Stephen (2002). William Walton: Muse of Fire. Woodbridge: Boydell. ISBN 978-0-85115-803-7.
- Saintsbury, George. Thackeray: Ballads and Contributions to Punch. London: Oxford University Press. OCLC 847994231.
