= Tafelmusik (Telemann) =

Collection of instrumental compositions by Georg Philipp Telemann

Tafelmusik; Musique de table
- Table music by Georg Philipp Telemann
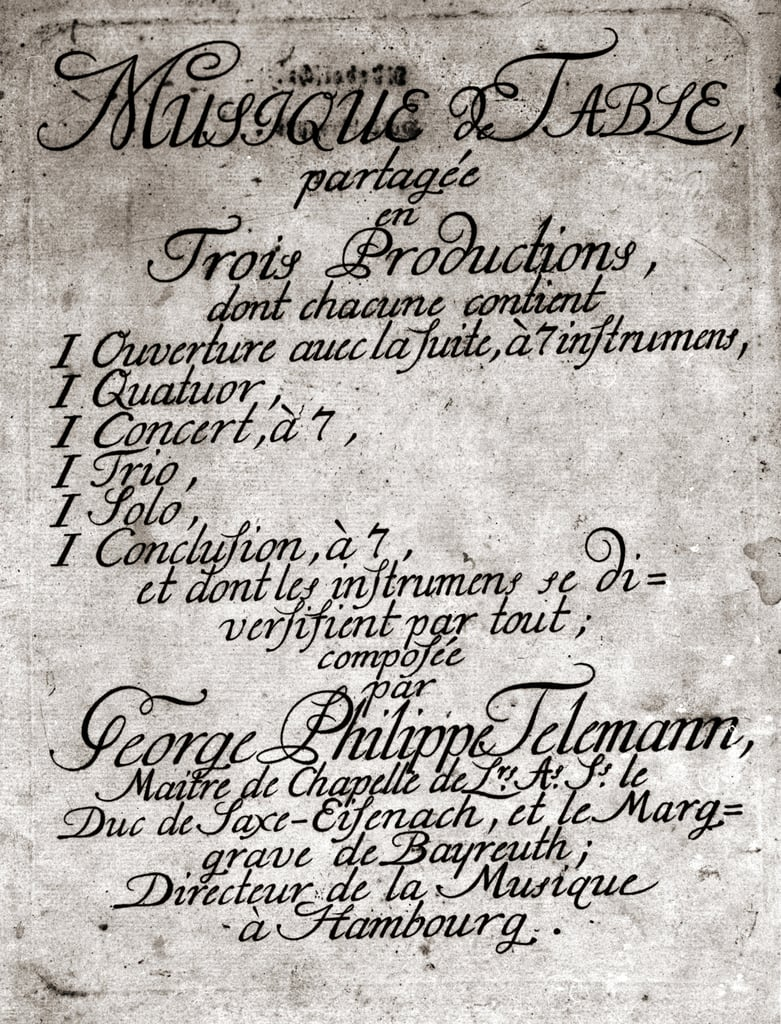
- Frontispice of the score for “Musique de table” (Tafelmusik)
- Published: 1733: Hamburg

Tafelmusik is a collection of instrumental compositions by Georg Philipp Telemann (1681–1767), published in 1733. The original title is Musique de table. The work is one of Telemann's most widely known compositions; it is the climax and at the same time one of the last examples of courtly table music.

== Publication ==
The composition addressed predominantly wealthy music lovers. The complete set of parts of the extensive work, engraved in copper, cost 8 Reichsthaler — an exorbitant price, considering the fact that Johann Sebastian Bach received the same sum as remuneration for a complete orchestra at a court concert.

More than 200 subscribers were found who were willing to pay the price in advance and whose name, social status, and address were published in the first edition. The illustrious list comprised crowned heads, noblewomen, and merchants as well as German and non-German musicians and composers — among others George Frideric Handel from London, Johann Georg Pisendel and Johann Joachim Quantz from Dresden and Michel Blavet from Paris.

Telemann, who was music director of Hamburg at the time of publication, wrote:

Diß Werk wird hoffentlich mir einst zum Ruhm gedeien,
Du aber wirst den Wehrt zu keiner Zeit bereuen ...
This work will hopefully bring me glory one day; but you will never have regrets about its value ...

Max Seiffert proved 18 different citations from the Tafelmusik in Handel's works — in their time this was not considered plagiarism. Quite on the contrary, Telemann felt flattered, the more so as Handel reciprocated by procuring rare plants for his old friend.

== Structure ==
The work consists of three parts (French: productions) with equal structure: they begin with an overture for full-scale orchestra, followed by a quartet for three instruments and continuo, an instrumental concerto for several solo instruments and strings, a trio sonata and a solo sonata with continuo. The final movements are titled Conclusion by Telemann: he resumes the key and instrumentation of the overture; beyond that, keys and instrumentation follow no discernible scheme.

With overture, concert, trio and solo sonata and the — in Baroque times — rare quartet, each part offers an example of the most important instrumental genres.

=== 1. Production ===
Ouverture (Suite) in e minor, TWV 55:e1 for two flutes, strings and continuo

1. Ouverture: Lentement – Vite – Lentement
2. Rejouissance
3. Rondeau
4. Loure
5. Passepied
6. Air
7. Gigue

Quartet in G major, TWV 43:G2 for flute, oboe, violin and continuo

1. Largo – Allegro – Largo
2. Vivace – Moderato – Vivace
3. Grave
4. Vivace

Concerto in A major, TWV 53:A2 for flute, violin, violoncello, strings and continuo

1. Largo
2. Allegro
3. Grazioso
4. Allegro

Trio in E♭ major, TWV 42:Es1 for two violins and continuo

1. Affettuoso
2. Vivace
3. Grave
4. Allegro

Sonata in B minor, TWV 41:h4 for flute and continuo

1. Cantabile
2. Allegro
3. Dolce
4. Allegro

Conclusion in e minor, TWV 50:5 for two flutes, strings and continuo

- Sinfonia

=== 2. Production ===
Ouverture (Suite) in D major, TWV 55:D1 for oboe, trumpet, strings and continuo

1. Ouverture
2. Air: Tempo giusto
3. Air: Vivace
4. Air: Presto
5. Air: Allegro

Quartet in d minor, TWV 43:d1 for two flutes, recorder (or bassoon) and continuo

1. Andante
2. Vivace
3. Largo
4. Allegro

Concerto in F major, TWV 53:F1 for three violins, strings and continuo

1. Allegro
2. Largo
3. Vivace

Trio in e minor, TWV 42:e2 for flute, oboe and continuo

1. Affettuoso
2. Allegro
3. Dolce
4. Vivace

Sonate in A major, TWV 41:A4 for violin and continuo

1. Andante
2. Vivace
3. Cantabile
4. Allegro – Adagio – Allegro – Adagio

Conclusion in D major, TWV 50:9 for oboe, trumpet, strings and continuo

- Allegro – Adagio – Allegro

=== 3. Production ===
Overture (Suite) in B♭ major, TWV 55:B1 for two oboes, bassoon, strings, continuo

1. Ouverture
2. Bergerie (un peu vivement)
3. Allegresse (vite)
4. Postillons
5. Flaterie
6. Badinage (très vite)
7. Menuet

Quartet in e minor, TWV 43:e2 for flute, violin, violoncello and continuo

1. Adagio
2. Allegro
3. Dolce
4. Allegro

Concerto in E♭ major, TWV 54:Es1 for two horns, strings and continuo

1. Maestoso
2. Allegro
3. Grave
4. Vivace

Trio in D major, TWV 42:D5 for two flutes and continuo

1. Andante
2. Allegro
3. Grave – Largo – Grave
4. Vivace

Sonata in g minor, TWV 41:g6 for oboe and continuo

1. Largo
2. Presto: Tempo giusto
3. Andante
4. Allegro

Conclusion in B♭ major, TWV 50:10 for two oboes, bassoon, strings, continuo

- Furioso

== Recordings ==
- 1964/65 – Schola Cantorum Basiliensis, August Wenzinger – Deutsche Grammophon
- 1964 – Concerto Amsterdam, Frans Brüggen – Das Alte Werk
- 1977 – Collegium Aureum, Franzjosef Maier – Deutsche Harmonia Mundi (excerpts)
- 1982 – Orchestre de Chambre Jean-François Paillard, Jean-François Paillard – Erato (excerpts)
- 1988 – Amsterdam Baroque Orchestra, Ton Koopman – Erato (excerpts)
- 1989 – Concentus Musicus Wien, Nikolaus Harnoncourt – Teldec
- 1989 – Musica Antiqua Köln, Reinhard Goebel – Archiv Produktion
- 1989 – Capella Istropolitana, Richard Edlinger – Naxos (excerpts; paired with the Viola Concerto)
- 1993 – Camerata of the Eighteenth Century – MDG
- 1995 – Musica Bohemica, Jaroslav Krček – Gramofonové Závody (excerpts)
- 1996 – Academy of St. Martin in the Fields, Iona Brown – Philips Classics (excerpts; part of Philips Classics' "Goldenes Barock" series)
- 1998 – Orchestra of the Golden Age – Naxos
- 2006 – Musica Amphion, Pieter-Jan Belder – Brilliant Classics
- 2010 – Freiburg Baroque Orchestra, Petra Mullejans – Harmonia Mundi

Reinhard Goebel's recording of the complete Tafelmusik was the winner of the 1989 Penguin Rosette. The critics stated: "Much of Telemann's finest music is contained in this specially priced 4-CD set of his Tafelmusik, a collection encompassing the forms of the late Baroque: French overture and dance suite, quartet, concerto, trio, and solo sonata. Reinhard Goebel, a champion of this composer, and his Musica Antiqua Köln offer these outstanding performances of precision and clarity with dazzling virtuosity".
