= Miss Julie (Alwyn opera) =

- Opera by William Alwyn
- Language: English
- Based on: August Strindberg's Miss Julie
- Premiere: 16 July 1977; BBC Radio 3

Miss Julie is an English-language opera in two acts, with music and libretto by William Alwyn. His second and final opera, premiered in 1977 as a radio broadcast, Alwyn based it on the 1888 play Miss Julie by Swedish playwright August Strindberg.

== Performance history ==
The opera received its premiere as a BBC Radio 3 broadcast on 16 July 1977, from a studio recording made on 17 February 1977 in Brent Town Hall. Its first stage production was in 1992 at the Ballerup Theatre in Copenhagen, by Opera-Fabrikken. The first UK production was at the Norwich Triennial Festival in October 1997. The BBC Symphony Orchestra performed the opera in a semi-staged concert performance at the Barbican Centre in October 2019.

== Roles ==
Role	Voice type	Premiere performance BBC broadcast, 16 July 1977	Stage premiere Ballerup Theater, Opera-Fabrikken 26 October 1992	UK stage premiere Theatre Royal, Norwich 15 October 1997
Miss Julie	soprano	Jill Gomez	Susanne Raber	Judith Howarth
Jean, manservant of the Count, Miss Julie's father	baritone	Benjamin Luxon	Jørn Pedersen	Karl Raymond
Kristin, the cook	mezzo-soprano	Della Jones	Annette Lindjerg Simonsen	Fiona Kimm
Ulrik, the gamekeeper	tenor	Anthony Rolfe Johnson	Ole Vadsten	Ian Caley
Orchestra		BBC Concert Orchestra	Lyngby-Taarbæk Symfoniorkester	Britten Sinfonia
Conductor		Vilém Tauský	Frans Rasmussen	Nicholas Cleobury

== Synopsis ==
The action is set on an estate of a Swedish count, during Midsommarafton (Midsummer's Eve).

=== Act I ===
Scene 1: The Count's staff and servants are celebrating Midsummer at a dance in a nearby barn. The Count is at his sister's residence and has left his daughter, Miss Julie, in charge of the house. Kristin, the cook and Jean's implicit fiancee, waits for Jean to take her to the dance. Meanwhile, she stirs on the stove a potion for Miss Julie's lap-dog, who is on heat, meant to keep other dogs away. Jean returns to the kitchen from the barn and has danced with Miss Julie, whom he found with Ulrik, the gamekeeper. Jean and Kristin state that Miss Julie has become 'utterly crazy' since her mother's suicide. Jean brazenly opens a stolen bottle of the Count's wine, then starts to tease Kristin's affections. Miss Julie interrupts them, nominally asking about the potion but hoping to lure Jean back to the barn. Miss Juie tells Kristin to go and change for the dance. She then sings to Jean about Midsummer Night and persuades him not to wait for Kristin.

Scene 2: Jean and Miss Julie return from the barn, after midnight. She alternately taunts him about his peasant background and provokes him. When he eventually kisses her, she is shocked and slaps him, but remains. Miffed, he starts to polish the Count's boots, but she orders him to stop, and they embrace. Ulrik approaches the kitchen, drunk and singing an innuendo-laden song about them. Jean has just enough time to hide Miss Julie in his bedroom before Ulrik arrives, who demands his own fun with her. Ulrik indicates that everyone knows of, and mocks, Miss Julie's infatuation with Jean. Ulrik then leaves. Miss Julie emerges angry, ashamed, and terrified of her father's reaction. She says that she has no option but to run away, and Jean sees an opportunity to fulfill his long-desired plan of opening a hotel in Lugano. They must leave by daybreak, before the Count returns. Meanwhile, they can spend the night together.

=== Act II ===
At dawn, Jean emerges from his bedroom. Miss Julie already regrets the assignation, but feels compelled to go along with Jean's plan, which, she now realises, depends on her stealing money from her father. She obeys and goes upstairs. Kristin enters and sees two glasses on the table. Jean says that he was drinking with Ulrik, but Kristin disbelieves him, and says that she will avoid scandal by giving notice, after which she and Jean will get married, which sentiment Jean dismisses. Ulrik returns to apologise for his earlier actions, but soon quarrels with Jean.

Miss Julie returns, dressed for travel, with a suitcase and her dog. Jean grabs, and orders Ulrik to dispose of, the dog. Offstage, a gunshot is heard. Miss Julie collapses. Jean and Kristin hurl accusations at each other. The ringing of the kitchen bell announces the return of the Count. Miss Julie watches as Jean begins to put on his uniform. He then dismisses the idea of the hotel in Lugano as a dream on Midsummer Night. Distraught, Miss Julie asks what to do next. Jean suggests her mother's way. The bell rings again. Jean pushes Miss Julie aside before climbing the stairs. Miss Julie picks up his razor from the table, then walks steadily and slowly out into the park.

== Recording ==
Lyrita made the first commercial recording of the opera over the period of 23–26 January 1979, at Kingsway Hall, with Vilem Tausky conducting the Philharmonia Orchestra. The cast consisted of the following singers:

- Jill Gomez (Miss Julie)
- Benjamin Luxon (Jean)
- Della Jones (Kristin)
- John Mitchinson (Ulrik)

The second recording of the opera appeared in July 2020 on Chandos (CHAN 5253), a studio recording with Sakari Oramo conducting the BBC Symphony Orchestra and the following singers, who also sang in the October 2019 Barbican performance:

- Anna Patalong (Miss Julie)
- Benedict Nelson (Jean)
- Rosie Aldridge (Kristin)
- Samuel Sakker (Ulrik)
