= Pieter-Jan Belder =

Dutch recorder player, harpsichordist, organist and conductor

- Born: 19 January 1966 (age 60); Capelle aan den IJssel, Netherlands
- Occupations: Classical keyboard player; Recorder player
- Organizations: Musica Amphion
- Awards: NDR-Musikpreis; International Bach Competition
- Website: www.pieterjanbelder.nl

Pieter-Jan Belder (born 19 January 1966) is a Dutch instrumentalist in historically informed performance, playing recorder, harpsichord and fortepiano. He founded the ensemble Musica Amphion for recordings and performances.

== Career ==
Born in Capelle aan den IJssel, Belder studied recorder with Ricardo Kanjii at the Koninklijk Conservatorium in The Hague, and harpsichord with Bob van Asperen at the Sweelinck Conservatorium in Amsterdam. He graduated in 1990 in both fields.

Belder won the NDR-Musikpreis in Hamburg in 1997, and in 2000 the International Bach Competition in Leipzig. He has worked as a continuo player with ensembles such as the Nederlandse Bachvereniging, Collegium Vocale Gent, the Concertgebouworkest and Camerata Trajectina.

Belder took part in the recordings of the complete works by Johann Sebastian Bach by the label Brilliant Classics, including Das wohltemperierte Klavier. He recorded for the label also all 555 keyboard sonatas by Domenico Scarlatti in 2007, and keyboard compositions by Antonio Soler and Jean-Philippe Rameau. He has worked from 2010 to 2013 recording the complete Fitzwilliam Virginal Book of more than 300 pieces. Belder used different instruments for the different character of compositions by William Byrd, Peter Philips, Jan Pieterszoon Sweelinck, Giles Farnaby and John Bull, among others.

== Musica Amphion ==
Belder founded an ensemble, Musica Amphion, for playing mostly Baroque music. They recorded the complete works by Arcangelo Corelli, and the complete Tafelmusik by Georg Philipp Telemann in 2004. They then began a project with the label Etcetera Bach in Context, combining Bach's vocal works and organ compositions focused on a theme. The fifth recording, with organist and the Gesualdo Consort Amsterdam, combines the Organ Sonata in E-flat major, BWV 525, the funeral cantata Actus Tragicus, BWV 106, the motet Komm, Jesu, komm, BWV 229, the chorale prelude on "Schmücke dich, o liebe Seele", BWV 654, and the cantate Mit Fried und Freud ich fahr dahin, BWV 125.

The ensemble recorded in 2006 Bach's Brandenburg Concertos and his concertos for 2, 3 and 4 harpsichords. They began a recording of the complete chamber music by Henry Purcell.
