= Walther Gruner =

German opera singer

Walther Gruner (25 September 1905 – 5 January 1980) was a baritone who taught at the Guildhall School of Music and Drama.

== Early life and family ==
Walther Karl Grünebaum was born at Blumenstrasse 13, Frankfurt, Germany to Jewish parents. His father was Julius Grünebaum, a merchant, and his mother was Klara Lina Grünebaum née Oppenheim, a music teacher. Both of his parents later were murdered in the Holocaust. His sister Hedi Frank (born 1900) became a chiropodist and moved to Australia in 1939. Hermann Grunebaum, a pianist and conductor who was Chorus Master at the Royal Opera House Covent Garden from 1907 to 1933, was his uncle; English-born soprano Nora Gruhn (formerly Grunebaum) was his cousin.

He attended the Hoch Conservatory, Frankfurt; the Music Conservatory, Leipzig; and the Vienna Conservatory of Music. He studied with Swedish baritone Hjalmar Arlberg in Leipzig and with Lothar Wallerstein in Vienna, as well as with Paul Bekker and Arthur Seidl. His experience conducting a choir as a student led to a position as assistant to Paul Bekker, who was then Intendant of Wiesbaden State Opera. He took the surname Gruner in 1928. (The surname is spelled with no umlaut over the first vowel.)

== Later career ==
He arrived in England in 1933, having left Germany to escape the Nazis. From 1935-1939 he lectured at the City Literary Institute, London, and in 1940 was interned on the Isle of Man for five months. He became a naturalized British citizen in 1946 and married English mezzo-soprano Mercia Glossop in 1951. They later divorced.

From 1945 to 1979 he worked as a professor of singing and German lieder at the Guildhall School of Music and Drama in London. His students included baritones Geraint Evans and Benjamin Luxon, and sopranos Jill Gomez and Patricia Rozario. He was also a jury member for a number of international music festivals, including Bayreuth in 1974, and contributed to the 1978 book Tensions in the Performance of Music: A Symposium. He lectured extensively in the United States and Australia, and was the London Correspondent for the Frankfurter Zeitung.

He sang as a baritone soloist on the BBC in the 1950s and recorded German lieder and folksongs for Linguaphone under the title German Songs, Series A. These recordings can be heard at the British Library; some are also held in the historical sound archives of the Robert Schumann Hochschule, Düsseldorf.

After his death, an annual song prize was founded in his name - the Walther Gruner International Lieder Competition. The first winner was Olaf Bär. This competition is no longer held.
