= The True Glory =

1945 film by Carol Reed, Garson Kanin

- Full film (restored)
- Directed by: Garson Kanin; Carol Reed
- Written by: Paddy Chayefsky; Peter Ustinov
- Produced by: Office of War Information, Ministry of Information
- Starring: Dwight D. Eisenhower; George S. Patton; Sam Levene; Peter Ustinov
- Cinematography: Russ Meyer
- Edited by: Richard Farrell
- Music by: William Alwyn
- Distributed by: Columbia Pictures
- Release dates: 27 August 1945 (UK); 4 October 1945 (U.S.)
- Running time: 87 minutes
- Countries: United Kingdom; United States
- Language: English

The True Glory (1945) is a co-production of the US Office of War Information and the British Ministry of Information, documenting the victory on the Western Front, from Normandy to the collapse of the Third Reich.

The film was co-directed by the American screenwriter and director Garson Kanin and British director Sir Carol Reed. The documentary was promoted with the tagline, "The story of your victory...told by the guys who won it!" The film won the Academy Award for Best Documentary Feature.

The original musical score was written by American Marc Blitzstein. The British were not happy with the avant-garde nature of the score, and it was replaced with a more formal score composed by William Alwyn and performed by the London Symphony Orchestra.

The film was produced at Pinewood Studios in Iver Heath, 18 miles west of Central London .

== Format ==
The documentary film is notable for using multiple first-person perspectives as narrative voices, somewhat in the manner of Tunisian Victory (1944). However, in The True Glory, instead of just an American G.I. and a British Tommy, the voices include a Canadian, a French resister, a Parisian civilian family, an African-American tank gunner, and several female perspectives including a nurse and clerical staff. The film is introduced by General Dwight D. Eisenhower, Supreme Commander of Allied Forces in Europe. Prominent commentators include General George S. Patton; Best Actor Tony nominee and American Theatre Hall of Fame and Grammy Hall of Fame Broadway and film star Sam Levene; two-time Academy Award-winning film actor and director, Peter Ustinov; and three-time Academy Award-winning playwright Paddy Chayefsky.

The title is taken from a letter of Sir Francis Drake, which is quoted in a final caption: "There must be a beginning of any great matter, but the continuing unto the end until it be thoroughly finished yields the true glory."

== See also ==
- List of Allied propaganda films of World War II
