= Jaap Schröder =

Dutch musician (1925–2020)

Jaap Schröder (31 December 1925 – 1 January 2020) was a Dutch violinist, conductor, and pedagogue.

He studied at the Amsterdam Conservatory and at the Sorbonne in France. In the 1960s he was a member of the Dutch early music group Concerto Amsterdam and made recordings with Gustav Leonhardt, Anner Bylsma, Frans Brüggen and others. Since 1981 he served as the director and concertmaster of the Academy of Ancient Music, and in 1982 he was appointed the visiting music director of the Smithsonian Chamber Players. He served as a faculty member at the Schola Cantorum Basiliensis, Yale School of Music and the Luxembourg Conservatory.

== Works ==
- Bach's Solo Violin Works. Yale University Press. 2007. ISBN 978-0-300-12466-8.
