= Concerto Amsterdam =

Dutch classical chamber ensemble

Concerto Amsterdam was a classical chamber ensemble based in the Netherlands and active during the 1960s and 1970s in both live performance and the recording studio. It was founded in 1960 by the Dutch violinist Jaap Schröder with most of its members drawn from Amsterdam's Royal Concertgebouw Orchestra. In addition to Schröder who served as the ensemble's concert master until 1973, its soloists have included keyboardist Gustav Leonhardt, violist Joke Vermeulen, flautist Frans Brüggen, and cellist Anner Bylsma.

Concerto Amsterdam's musicians originally played on modern instruments using "historically informed" performance techniques. However, in the late 1960s the ensemble transitioned to performing on "period" instruments. The mainstay of their repertoire was music from the Baroque and early Classical periods, but they also made the first complete recording of Die 7 Kammermusiken by the 20th-century composer Paul Hindemith. The ensemble received the Edison Award in 1977. Many of their original vinyl recordings for Telefunken have since been reissued on CD by Teldec in Das Alte Werke series.

== Recordings ==
Concerto Amsterdam's recordings include:

- Telemann: Tafelmusik (1964). Originally released on LP by Telefunken, reissued on CD by Teldec in 1994.
- Boccherini: Cello Concertos (1965); Anner Bylsma, soloist. Originally released on LP by Telefunken, reissued on CD by Teldec in 1993.
- J. S. Bach: Jauchzet Gott in allen Landen (details) and Weichet nur, betrübte Schatten (1966); Agnes Giebel, soloist. Originally released on LP by Telefunken, reissued on CD by Teldec in 1993.
- J. S. Bach: Laß, Fürstin, laß noch einen Strahl, BWV 198 (1967). Originally released on LP by Telefunken, reissued on CD by Teldec in 1994.
- Hindemith: Die 7 Kammermusiken (1969). Originally released on LP by Telefunken, reissued on CD by Warner Classics in 2011.
- Horn Concertos by Danzi, Rosetti & Haydn (1969); Hermann Baumann, soloist. Originally released on LP by Telefunken, reissued on CD by Teldec in 2012.
- Danzi: Bassoon Concerto in F, P. 237 & Sinfonia Concertante in B, P. 227; Karl-Otto Hartmann & Dieter Klöcker, soloists. Jaap Schröder (cond.). Originally released on LP by Acanta/Bellaphon (EA 23 144), ca. 1971.
- Vivaldi: The Four Seasons (1974). Originally released on LP by Harmonia Mundi, reissued on CD by Harmonia Mundi in 1994.
- Handel: The 16 organ concertos (1976); Daniel Chorzempa, soloist. Originally released on LP by Philips, reissued on CD by Pentatone in 2003.
- Leclair: Violin Concertos (1978); Jaap Schröder, soloist. Originally released on LP by Telefunken, reissued on CD by Teldec in 2012.
