= William Alwyn =

English composer (1905–1985)

William Alwyn CBE
- Born: William Alwyn Smith; 7 November 1905; Northampton, England
- Died: 11 September 1985 (aged 79); Southwold, England
- Education: Royal Academy of Music
- Occupations: Composer; Conductor
- Spouses: Olive Pull; Doreen Carwithen
- Children: Nicholas Alwyn; Jonathan Alwyn
- Relatives: Joe Alwyn (great-grandson)

William Alwyn CBE (born William Alwyn Smith; 7 November 1905 – 11 September 1985) was an English composer, conductor, and music teacher who composed over 200 cinematic scores, of which some 70 were for full-length features, as well as number of operas, concertos and symphonies.

Alwyn's wartime work in particular is what led him to be placed on a Nazi death list.

== Life and music ==
William Alwyn was born William Alwyn Smith in Northampton, England, the son of Ada Tyler (Tompkins) and William James Smith. He showed an early interest in music and began to learn to play the piccolo. At the age of 15, he entered the Royal Academy of Music in London, where he studied flute, piano and composition. For a time he was a flautist with the London Symphony Orchestra. Alwyn served as professor of composition at the Royal Academy of Music from 1926 to 1955.

Alwyn was a polyglot, poet, and artist, as well as musician. In 1948, he became a member of the Savile Club in London. He helped found the Composers' Guild of Great Britain (now merged into the British Academy of Songwriters, Composers and Authors), and was its chairman in 1949, 1950 and 1954. He was also sometime Director of the Mechanical-Copyright Protection Society, a Vice-President of the Society for the Promotion of New Music (SPNM) and Director of the Performing Right Society. For many years he was one of the panel engaged by the BBC to read new scores to help assess whether the works should be performed and broadcast. He was appointed a Commander of the Order of the British Empire (CBE) in the 1978 Birthday Honours in recognition of his services to music.

His compositional output included five symphonies, four operas, several concertos, film scores and string quartets.

In addition to scores for documentaries, Alwyn wrote more than 70 feature film scores from 1941 to 1962. His classic film scores included Green for Danger (1944), Odd Man Out (1947), Desert Victory (1943), Fires Were Started (1943), The History of Mr. Polly (1949), The Fallen Idol (1948), The Black Tent (1956), The Way Ahead (1944), The True Glory (1945) and The Crimson Pirate (1952). Some of the scores have been lost, although many scores and sketches are now in the William Alwyn Archive at Cambridge University Library. In recent years CD recordings have been made. Some works, for which only fragmentary sketches remained, were reconstructed by Philip Lane or Christopher Palmer from the film soundtracks themselves.

Alwyn's wartime scores were considered to be so critical to boosting public morale that he was placed on a Nazi German 'death list', a post-war discovery that apparently thrilled him.

Alwyn relished dissonance, and devised his own alternative to 12-tone serialism. For instance, in his Third Symphony (1955–56), eight notes of the possible 12 are used in the first movement, with the remaining four (D, E, F, and A♭) constituting the middle movement, and all 12 being combined for the finale. The work was premièred on 10 October 1956 at the Royal Festival Hall by Sir Thomas Beecham.

Alwyn's concerto for harp and string orchestra, Lyra Angelica, was popularized when the American figure skater Michelle Kwan performed to it at the 1998 Winter Olympics.

Alwyn spent the last 25 years of his life at Lark Rise, Dunwich Road, Blythburgh, Suffolk, where he composed his Concerto Grosso no. 3 (1964), two operas, Juan, or the Libertine and Miss Julie, and his last major orchestral work, Symphony No. 5 Hydriotaphia (1972–73).

Alwyn recorded his five symphonies as conductor for the Lyrita label in the 1970s, recordings that have since been reissued on CD. Most of Alwyn's orchestral and chamber music has more recently been recorded on CD for Chandos Records: the five symphonies were played by the London Symphony Orchestra, conducted by Richard Hickox.

Alwyn's opera Miss Julie has been recorded twice: for Lyrita, and in 2019 for Chandos, conducted by Sakari Oramo.

== Personal life ==
Alwyn was first married to Olive Mary Audrey (née Pull), with whom he had two sons, Jonathan Alwyn and Nicholas Alwyn. His second wife was the composer Doreen Carwithen. His great-grandson is the actor Joe Alwyn. He died in Southwold, Suffolk, in 1985 and is buried in the churchyard of Holy Trinity Church, Blythburgh, Suffolk.

== Selected works ==
=== Stage ===
- The Fairy Fiddler, opera (1922)
- Fedelma, mime ballet in one scene (February 1931); libretto: Padraic Colum, choreography: Ninette de Valois; costumes: Dolly Travers-Smith; Abbey Theatre Dublin
- Farewell, Companions, Radio opera (1955); libretto by H.A.L. Craig
- Juan, or The Libertine, opera in 4 acts (1965–1971); libretto by the composer freely adapted from James Elroy Flecker's play Don Juan and other works
- Miss Julie, opera in 2 acts (1972–1976); libretto by the composer after the 1888 play by August Strindberg

=== Orchestral ===
- Five Preludes (1927)
- Aphrodite in Aulis, Eclogue after George Moore for small orchestra (1932)
- The Innumerable Dance, an English Overture (1933)
- Tragic Interlude for 2 horns, timpani and string orchestra (1936)
- Overture to a Masque (1940)
- Concerto Grosso No. 1 in B♭ major (1942)
- Score for Country Town (1943)
- Suite of Scottish Dances for small orchestra (1946)
- Concerto Grosso No. 2 in G major for string quartet and string orchestra (1948)
- Symphony No. 1 (1948–1949)
- Festival March (1951)
- The Magic Island, Symphonic Prelude (1952)
- Symphony No. 2 (1953)
- Symphony No. 3 (1955–1956)
- Elizabethan Dances (1956–1957)
- Fanfare for a Joyful Occasion for brass and percussion (1958)
- Symphony No. 4 (1959)
- Derby Day, Overture (1960)
- Concerto Grosso No. 3 (1964)
- Sinfonietta [No. 1] for string orchestra (1970)
- Symphony No. 5 Hydriotaphia (1972–1973)
- Sinfonietta No. 2 for string orchestra (1976)

=== Band ===
- The Moor of Venice, Overture for brass band (1956)

=== Concertante ===
- Piano Concerto No. 1 (1930)
- Violin Concerto (1939)
- Pastoral Fantasia for viola and string orchestra (1939)
- Concerto for oboe, harp and strings (1944)
- Autumn Legend for cor anglais and string orchestra (1954)
- Lyra Angelica, Concerto for harp and string orchestra (1954)
- Piano Concerto No. 2 (1960)
- Concerto for flute and 8 wind instruments (1980)

=== Chamber music ===
- Sonatina for violin and piano (1933)
- Sonata for oboe and piano (1934)
- 2 Folk Tunes for cello or viola and piano (or harp) (1936)
- Novelette for string quartet (1938)
- Ballade for viola and piano (1939)
- Sonata Impromptu for violin and viola (1939)
- Rhapsody for violin, viola, cello and piano (1939)
- Divertimento for solo flute (1940)
- Sonatina for viola and piano (1941)
- Suite for oboe and harp (1944)
- Sonata for flute and piano (1948)
- Three Winter Poems for string quartet (1948)
- Conversations for violin, clarinet and piano (1950)
- Trio for flute, cello and piano (1951)
- String Quartet No. 1 in D minor (1953)
- Crepuscule for harp (1955)
- Sonata for clarinet and piano (1962)
- String Trio (1962)
- Moto Perpetuo for recorders (1970)
- Naiades, Fantasy Sonata for flute and harp (1971)
- String Quartet No. 2 Spring Waters (1975)
- Chaconne for Tom for descant recorder and piano (1982)
- String Quartet No. 3 (1984)

=== Piano ===
- Hunter's Moon (1920s)
- Odd Moments, Suite (1920s)
- The Orchard (1920s)
- Haze of Noon (1926)
- Two Irish Pieces
- April Morn, 4 Petites Pièces (1924–1926)
- Fancy Free, 4 Pieces
- Contes Barbares, Hommage à Paul Gauguin (1930–1933)
- Night Thoughts (1940)
- Prelude and Fugue Formed on an Indian Scale (1945)
- Sonata alla Toccata (1946)
- By the Farmyard Gate, 4 Pieces
- From Ireland, 7 Traditional Tunes
- Wooden Walls, Suite
- Midsummer Night, Suite
- Green Hills
- Five Pieces, Suite
- Two Intermezzi
- Two Pieces
- Harvest Home, Suite
- The Tinker's Tune
- Down by the Riverside
- Nine Children's Pieces
- Fantasy-Waltzes (1956)
- Twelve Preludes (1958)
- Movements (1961)
- Twelve Diversions for the Five Fingers

=== Vocal and Choral ===
- The Marriage of Heaven and Hell, oratorio (1936, fp. 18 February 2023, King's College, London)
- 3 Songs to Words by Trevor Blakemore for voice and piano (1940)
- Mirages, song cycle for baritone and piano (1970)
- 6 Nocturnes for baritone and piano (1973)
- Invocations, song cycle for soprano and piano (1977)
- A Leave Taking, songs for tenor and piano (1978)
- Seascapes, song cycle for soprano, treble recorder and piano (1980)

=== Film scores ===
Date	Title	Director	Notes
1941	Penn of Pennsylvania	Lance Comfort	
1941	They Flew Alone	Herbert Wilcox	
1942	Squadron Leader X	Lance Comfort	
1942	The Harvest Shall Come	Basil Wright	
1943	Escape to Danger	Lance Comfort; Victor Hanbury	
1943	Desert Victory	Roy Boulting	
1943	Summer on the Farm	Raph Keene	
1944	Medal for the General	Maurice Elvey	
1944	The Way Ahead	Carol Reed	
1944	The True Glory	Carol Reed	
1945	Great Day	Lance Comfort	
1945	The Rake's Progress	Sidney Gilliat	
1946	I See a Dark Stranger	Frank Launder	a.k.a. The Adventuress
1946	Odd Man Out	Carol Reed	
1946	Green for Danger	Sidney Gilliat	
1947	Take My Life	Ronald Neame	
1947	The October Man	Roy Ward Baker	
1947	Captain Boycott	Frank Launder	
1948	Escape	Joseph L. Mankiewicz	
1948	So Evil My Love	Lewis Allen	music also by Victor Young
1948	The Fallen Idol	Carol Reed	
1948	The Winslow Boy	Anthony Asquith	
1949	The History of Mr. Polly	Anthony Pelissier	
1949	The Rocking Horse Winner	Anthony Pelissier	
1949	The Cure for Love	Robert Donat	
1949	Madeleine	David Lean	
1949	Golden Salamander	Ronald Neame	
1950	State Secret	Sidney Gilliat	
1950	The Magnet	Charles Frend	
1950	The Mudlark	Jean Negulesco	
1950	Morning Departure	Roy Ward Baker	
1951	Night Without Stars	Anthony Pelissier	
1951	No Resting Place	Paul Rotha	
1951	The Magic Box	John Boulting	
1951	The House in the Square	Roy Ward Baker	a.k.a. I'll Never Forget You
1951	Lady Godiva Rides Again	Frank Launder	a.k.a. Bikini Baby
1952	The Card	Ronald Neame	
1952	Saturday Island	Stuart Heisler	a.k.a. Island of Desire
1952	Mandy	Alexander Mackendrick; Fred F. Sears	
1952	The Crimson Pirate	Robert Siodmak	
1952	The Long Memory	Robert Hamer	
1953	Malta Story	Brian Desmond Hurst	
1953	The Master of Ballantrae	William Keighley	
1953	Personal Affair	Anthony Pelissier	
1954	The Million Pound Note	Ronald Neame	
1954	The Rainbow Jacket	Basil Dearden	
1954	The Seekers	Ken Annakin	
1954	Svengali	Noel Langley	
1955	Bedevilled	Mitchell Leisen	
1955	The Ship That Died of Shame	Basil Dearden	
1955	Geordie	Frank Launder	
1955	Safari	Terence Young	
1956	The Black Tent	Brian Desmond Hurst	
1956	Smiley	Anthony Kimmins	
1956	Zarak	Terence Young	
1957	The Smallest Show on Earth	Basil Dearden	
1957	Manuela	Guy Hamilton	a.k.a. Stowaway Girl
1958	Fortune Is a Woman	Sidney Gilliat	
1958	Carve Her Name with Pride	Lewis Gilbert	
1958	I Accuse!	José Ferrer	
1958	The Silent Enemy	William Fairchild	
1958	A Night to Remember	Roy Ward Baker	
1959	Shake Hands with the Devil	Michael Anderson	
1959	Killers of Kilimanjaro	Richard Thorpe	
1959	Third Man on the Mountain	Ken Annakin	
1959	Devil's Bait	Peter Graham Scott	
1960	The Professionals	Don Sharp	
1960	Swiss Family Robinson	Ken Annakin	
1961	The Naked Edge	Michael Anderson	
1962	Night of the Eagle	Sidney Hayers	
1962	Life for Ruth	Basil Dearden	
1962	In Search of the Castaways	Robert Stevenson	
1963	The Running Man	Carol Reed	
