= Vilém Tauský =

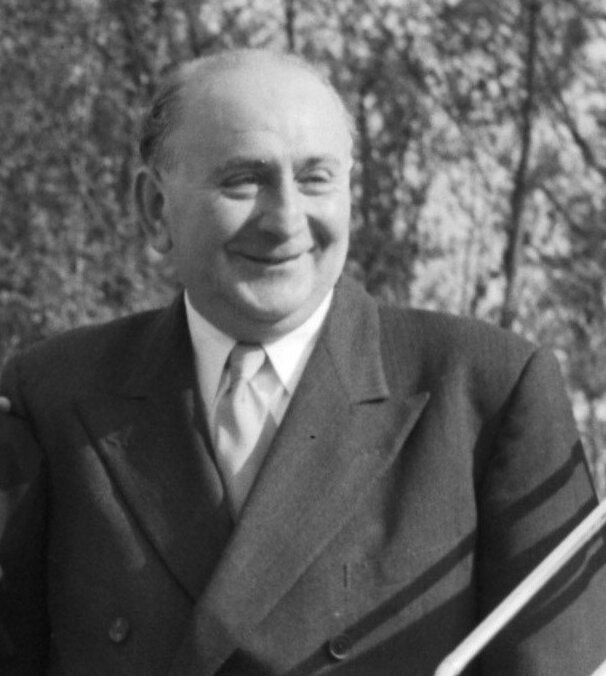
Tauský in 1959

Vilém Tauský CBE (20 July 1910 – 16 March 2004) was a Czech conductor and composer. From the advent of the Second World War, he lived and worked in the United Kingdom, and was one of a significant group of émigré composers and musicians who settled there.

== Early life and wartime ==
Vilém Tauský was born on 20 July 1910 in Přerov, Moravia, Austria-Hungary. He came from a musical family: his Viennese mother had sung Mozart at the Vienna State Opera under Gustav Mahler, and her cousin was the operetta composer Leo Fall.

Tauský studied with Leoš Janáček and later became a repetiteur at the Brno Opera. His other teachers included Vilém Petrzelka (composition) and Zdeněk Chalabala (conducting). At the age of nineteen, he conducted Puccini's Turandot in Brno on short notice in place of Chalabala, who had become ill. Tauský was of Jewish ancestry, and the rise of the Nazis forced him to move to France. He later volunteered for service with the Free Czech Army. He eventually reached the UK in 1940 after the fall of France, arriving with other soldiers on a Yugoslav coal ship to Newport, Monmouthshire.

He served musical functions in the Czechoslovak Army in exile, as a military band conductor in France. Bohuslav Martinů composed his Field Mass for Tauský and his regimental band, but the fall of France prevented them from giving the premiere. He continued as a band and choir leader in the UK.

During the Coventry Blitz on the night of 14 November 1940, Tauský was based ten miles away in Leamington Spa with the Czech Free Army. His unit was mobilized to search the ruins for survivors. He wrote his Coventry Meditation for strings to commemorate the civilian casualties and the destruction of the Cathedral. The work was first performed by the Menges Quartet on 17 March 1942 at a Myra Hess National Gallery Concert in London. The piece was revived in November 2021 by the Jubilee Quartet in Leamington. During the conflict he was awarded a Czech Military Cross, followed by the Czech Order of Merit at the end of the war.

== Opera ==
From 1945 to 1949, Tauský was musical director of the Carl Rosa Opera Company, and following several years conducting regional BBC orchestras in Belfast, Glasgow and Manchester he was appointed music director of Welsh National Opera (1951-1956). He made his Covent Garden début with The Queen of Spades in January, 1951. On 26 December 1953 he became possibly the only conductor to conduct two operas on the same day, with a performance of Humperdinck's Hansel and Gretel in the afternoon at Sadler's Wells and Giuseppe Verdi's Il trovatore at Covent Garden in the evening. He was artistic director of the Phoenix Opera touring company from 1966 to 1975.

Tauský introduced many Czech operas to the UK, including Smetana's The Kiss in 1948, Janáček's Osud in 1972 and Smetana's The Brandenburgers in Bohemia in 1994. In 1955 he also conducted all six symphonies by his friend Martinu in London, marking the composer's 65th birthday. He also conducted many premieres of UK operas including A Dinner Engagement and Nelson (Lennox Berkeley, both 1954), The Violins Of St Jacques (Malcolm Williamson, 1966) and a studio recording of Miss Julie (William Alwyn, 1977). In total Tauský was responsible for twenty-six British opera and operetta premières.

== Light music ==
Tauský was the first foreign conductor to conduct the Band of the Coldstream Guards in 100 years and was an instructor/adjudicator at Kneller Hall for some years, as well as an adjudicator at the annual Brass Band competitions. He was principal conductor of the BBC Concert Orchestra from 1956 to 1966. He regularly appeared with this orchestra on the BBC Light Programme's long-running weekly show Friday Night is Music Night. Between 1966 and 1992, he was the director of opera and head of the conducting course at the Guildhall School of Music and Drama. As a composer, his most popular success was the Harmonica Concertino he wrote for Tommy Reilly in 1973, which was also used for a ballet in New York.

Andrew Lamb points out that, following his ten years with the BBC Concert Orchestra during which he raised its profile and range considerably, he was forever after branded as a light music specialist. He "never regained the profile he had previously enjoyed in more serious music, for which he was eminently qualified".

== Marriage and memoirs ==
Tauský married his wife Margaret Helen Powell (then known as Peggy Mallett after a previous marriage) in 1948. They met while he was serving with the Free Czechoslovak Forces in Leamington Spa, and he became the stepfather of her two sons, both of whom predeceased him. They spent most of their marriage living in Rose Cottage, Chinnor Road, Towersey in Oxfordshire, where Margaret Tausky taught children dancing and Vilém Tauský helped establish the Towersey Festival. With his wife as co-author he published his memoirs under the title Vilém Tauský Tells his Story in 1978. That same year he was honoured as a Freeman of the City of London, and in 1981 he was appointed a Commander of the Order of the British Empire (CBE). He and his wife edited and translated the collection of essays and writings Leoš Janáček: Leaves from his Life, which was published in 1982. She died that year. Tauský died on 16 March 2004 in London at the age of 96, survived by his companion of his later years, Brenda Rayson. The Dvořák Society for Czech and Slovak Music published a tribute volume of essays to mark his centenary year in 2010.

== Selected works ==
- 1925 - Cello Sonata No 1
- 1930 - Symfonieta for orchestra
- 1930 - Three Songs for soprano & piano
- 1932-8 - Three operettas (for Brno Opera House): Marcella, Keep Smiling, Little Girl in Blue
- 1934 - Christopher Columbus, play with music
- 1935 -The Lost World, music for documentary film
- 1939 - Variations for Piano on an Original Theme
- 1940 - Two Military Marches: The Czechs are Marching, Call to Arms
- 1941 - Coventry: A Meditation for String Quartet
- 1942 - Variations on a Welsh Tune, piano
- 1943 - Interim Balance, music for documentary film
- 1945 - Rhapsody on Tunes by Smetana for piano & orchestra
- 1950 - Concert Overture for Brass Band
- 1957 - Fantasia da Burlesca for violin & orchestra
- 1957 - Oboe Concerto (arrangement of work by Vanhal, freely adapted for Evelyn Rothwell)
- 1964 - Cello Sonata No 2
- 1965 - Essay for solo viola
- 1965 - String Quartet
- 1973 - Concertino for Harmonica, Strings, Harp & Percussion (written for Tommy Reilly)
- 1975 - Ballade for cello and piano
- 1978 - From Our Village, three movement suite for orchestra
- 1980 - Suite for Violin & Piano
- 1998 - Serenade for Strings

== See also ==
- List of émigré composers who came to live and work in Britain

Preceded by Charles Mackerras	Principal Conductor, BBC Concert Orchestra; 1956–1966	Succeeded by Marcus Dods
