= John Constable (pianist) =

British pianist (1969–2025)

- Constable, in c. 2005
- Born: 1934; London, England
- Died: 2026 (aged 91)
- Education: Royal Academy of Music
- Occupations: Pianist; Academic teacher
- Organizations: Academy of St Martin in the Fields; London Sinfonietta; Royal College of Music

John Constable (1934–2026) was a British pianist and academic teacher. He was principal harpsichordist with the Academy of St Martin in the Fields for 38 years, and the principal pianist of the London Sinfonietta from their foundation in 1968 to 2017. He is also known for recitals and recordings with singers and instrumentalists. He taught at the Royal College of Music.

== Life and career ==
Constable was born in London in 1934. He studied at the Royal Academy of Music with Harold Craxton. He first worked for the Royal Opera House. He was principal harpsichordist with the Academy of St Martin in the Fields from 1964 for 38 years.

Constable was a founding member of the London Sinfonietta in 1968 and remained their principal pianist for 50 years. Focused on contemporary music, the group ran annual programs with one contemporary composer, of two weeks of rehearsals with the person followed by performances in London and on tours. In 1973 it was Karlheinz Stockhausen's turn for Kreuzspiel and Zeitmaße, which the ensemble had already performed, the UK premieres of Stop and Kontra-Punkte, and the world premiere of Ylem, commissioned by the ensemble.

Constable performed concertos with notable conductors including David Atherton, Hans Werner Henze, Oliver Knussen, and Simon Rattle, playing and conducting with the London Sinfonietta and the Birmingham Contemporary Music Group. He was the keyboard player for two cycles of Mozart operas by Philipps, with conductors Neville Marriner, Rattle, and Georg Solti. He played recitals with singers and instrumentalists, including Janet Baker, Jill Gomez, Philip Langridge, Christopher Maltman, Felicity Palmer, Lucy Shelton, and Paul Silverthorne, making many recordings. He often collaborated with Lucy Shelton, including the world premiere of Elliott Carter's Of Challenge and of Love for soprano and piano at the Aldeburgh Festival. He was the pianist in a 2005 recital, Songs Of The Americas, with Carole Farley, which included playing what composer Ned Rorem was planned to perform.

Constable taught at the Royal College of Music, and a Fellow at the Royal Academy of Music.

Constable died in March 2026, at the age of 91.
