= Benjamin Luxon =

British baritone (1937–2024)

Benjamin Matthew Luxon CBE (24 March 1937 – 26 July 2024) was a British baritone.

== Biography ==
Luxon was born in Redruth, Cornwall on 24 March 1937, the son of Ernest Maxwell Luxon, an amateur singer, and his wife Lucille Pearl, née Grigg. He studied with Walther Gruner at the Guildhall School of Music and Drama (while working part-time as a PE teacher in the East End) and established an international reputation as a singer at the age of 21 when he won the third prize at the 1961 ARD International Music Competition in Munich. Soon afterward he joined composer Benjamin Britten's English Opera Group. On their tour of the Soviet Union in 1963, he sang the roles of Sid and Tarquinius in Britten's operas Albert Herring and The Rape of Lucretia, respectively. In 1971, Britten composed the title role of his television opera Owen Wingrave specifically for Luxon's voice; Luxon created the role later that year with the English Opera Group.

The following year, 1972, Luxon made his début at both the Royal Opera House, Covent Garden – creating the role of the Jester in Peter Maxwell Davies' opera Taverner – and at the Glyndebourne Opera Festival, where he sang the title role in Raymond Leppard's realization of Monteverdi's Il ritorno d'Ulisse in patria. Thereafter he became a frequent guest at both venues and also at Tanglewood in Massachusetts, US.

In 1974, Luxon began his long association with the English National Opera, which culminated in his appearance in the title role of Verdi's Falstaff in 1992. He made his Metropolitan Opera début (as Eugene Onegin) in 1980, his La Scala début in 1986, and his Los Angeles début (as Wozzeck) in 1988. He sang in most of the major European opera houses and made frequent appearances in Munich (Bayerische Staatsoper) and Vienna (Wiener Staatsoper).

In addition to his opera work, Luxon also developed a reputation as a concert-giver and recitalist with an unusually broad repertoire, ranging from early music through Lieder to contemporary song, music hall and folk music. He has also been recognised for his work rehabilitating parlour songs from the late nineteenth and early twentieth century, particularly in partnership with Robert Tear. He made several appearances on BBC TV's long-running Music Hall Variety show, The Good Old Days, both with Robert Tear and on his own. His rendition of the song 'Give Me a ticket to Heaven' always met with tremendous acclaim. It was the song for which the BBC received the largest feedback of any featured on the programme.

Luxon has made more than one hundred recordings, many featuring early and mid twentieth-century British songwriting and folksong arrangements by composers such as Britten, George Butterworth, Percy Grainger, Ivor Gurney, Roger Quilter, Ralph Vaughan Williams, Gerald Finzi and Peter Warlock. His regular accompanist between 1961 and 1999 was the pianist David Willison. As a guest on the BBC's Desert Island Discs programme, he said that his favourite piece of music is Thomas Tallis's Spem in alium.

In the 1980s, he appeared in the Channel 4 series Top C's and Tiaras.

Luxon was appointed a Commander of the Order of the British Empire (CBE) in the 1986 Queen's Birthday Honours.

Starting around 1990, Luxon began to be troubled by hearing loss. Though he explored a variety of conventional and 'alternative' treatments, continued fluctuation and deterioration in his hearing forced him to end his singing career by the end of the decade. Afterward, Luxon developed a career as a narrator and poetry reader, whilst continuing to give master classes and direct opera. In the final years of his life, he resided in the United States, living in the Berkshires in Western Massachusetts. He was a naturalised US citizen.

=== Personal life and death ===
Luxon was married twice; he was married to Israeli soprano Sheila Amit until their divorce in 2002, and later that year, he married Susan Crofut. He had three children.

Luxon died from colorectal cancer at his home in Sandisfield, Massachusetts, on 25 July 2024, at the age of 87.

== Operatic roles ==
(Performed and/or recorded, listed alphabetically)

Role	Opera	Composer
Count Almaviva	Le nozze di Figaro	Mozart
Demetrius	A Midsummer Night's Dream	Britten
Don Giovanni	Don Giovanni	Mozart
Dr. Falke	Die Fledermaus	Johann Strauss II
Eugene Onegin	Eugene Onegin	Tchaikovsky
Falstaff	Falstaff	Verdi
Figaro	Il barbiere di Siviglia	Rossini
Jester	Taverner	Peter Maxwell Davies
Owen Wingrave	Owen Wingrave	Britten
Papageno	The Magic Flute	Mozart
Posa	Don Carlo	Verdi
Sid	Albert Herring	Britten
Tarquinius	The Rape of Lucretia	Britten
Ulisse	Il ritorno d'Ulisse in patria	Monteverdi
Wolfram	Tannhäuser	Wagner
Wozzeck	Wozzeck	Alban Berg

== Selected discography ==
Year	Work/s	Composer/s	
1975	John Ireland Songs	Ireland	Alan Rowlands piano. Lyrita, released (vinyl) 1975
1989	War Requiem	Britten	Atlanta Symphony Orchestra et al., cond. Robert Shaw; Telarc, recorded 1988
1989	Simple Gifts; Benjamin Luxon and Bill Crofut sing folk songs at Tanglewood		Omega
1992	I Love My Love: A Collection of British Folk Songs		Chandos Records
1992	Vaughan Williams: Songs of Travel	Vaughan Williams	Chandos Records, recorded 1986
1992	Quilter Songs	Roger Quilter	Chandos Records, recorded 1989
1992	Butterworth and Gurney: Songs	Butterworth, Gurney	Chandos Records, recorded 1989
1993	Owen Wingrave	Britten	English Chamber Orchestra et al., cond. Benjamin Britten; Decca, recorded 1970
1994	The Dream of Gerontius	Elgar	Scottish National Orchestra et al., cond. Sir Alexander Gibson; CRD Records
1998	Fauré: Requiem, Messe Basse	Fauré	English Chamber Orchestra et al., cond. Philip Ledger; EMI Classics for Pleasure
1998	Warlock Songs	Peter Warlock	Chandos Records
2003	Enoch Arden	Richard Strauss	Luxon narrates Tennyson poems. JRI Recordings.
2004	Songs from "A Shropshire Lad", English Idylls, Bredon Hill	Butterworth	Decca
2004	Die Zauberflöte	Mozart	London Philharmonic Orchestra et al., cond. Bernard Haitink; Arthaus Musik DVD

== Videography ==
- Glyndebourne Festival Opera: a Gala Evening (1992), Arthaus Musik DVD, 100-432, 2004
