= Howard Wong =

- Born: 1972 or 1973 (age 52–53)
- Other name: "Masta Wong"
- Known for: three-time winner on "Pants-Off Dance-Off".

Howard Wong — known as "Masta Wong" — is a three-time winner on Fuse TV's "Pants-Off Dance-Off".

Wong initially won on the show's April 27, 2006 broadcast — and then on the two subsequent episodes that pitted him against other popular “Pants-Off Dance-Off” contestants. For the competition, Wong stripped to Robbie Williams’s “Rock DJ".

Wong started briefly as a medical student in Northern California, but after dropping out worked as a photographer shooting pornographic videos. He had also attended a nude retreat before coming onto the show. He is also a yoga enthusiast. Wong joined a nude e-mail list and saw an item in a nudist's magazine that made him to be on the show.

About his performance during the show he says, "I didn't know what to say or what to do ... I'm not going to lie", he continued, "it is kind of cool."
