= Sitwell Sitwell =

British politician and landowner

The Right Honourable Sir Sitwell Sitwell, Bt JP

Member of Parliament for West Looe
- In office 1801–1802 Serving with John Hookham Frere
- Preceded by: Parliament of Great Britain
- Succeeded by: James Buller; Thomas Smith
- In office 1796–1801 Serving with John Buller, John Hookham Frere
- Preceded by: Sir John de la Pole; John Pardoe
- Succeeded by: Parliament of the United Kingdom

Personal details
- Born: Sitwell Hurt; September 1769
- Died: 14 July 1811 (aged 41)
- Spouse(s): Alice Parke (m. 1791; died 1797) Sarah Caroline Stovin (m. 1798; died 1811)
- Children: 4, including George
- Parent(s): Francis Hurt; Mary Warneford
- Education: Christ Church, Oxford

Sir Sitwell Sitwell, 1st Baronet JP (né Hurt; September 1769 – 14 July 1811) was a British politician and landowner.

== Early life ==
Born as Sitwell Hurt in September 1769, he was the eldest son of Mary (née Warneford) Hurt and Francis Hurt (1728–1793) of Mount Pleasant, Sheffield, who changed his surname to Sitwell in 1777, when he inherited the Renishaw Hall, Derbyshire estates of his mother's cousin. Among his siblings were younger brother was Francis Sitwell, MP for Berwick-upon-Tweed (who married Ann Campbell, a daughter of Ilay Campbell of Succoth), and sister, Mary Sitwell, who married Sir William Wake, 9th Baronet (after Mary's death, Sir William married Jenny Gambier, daughter of Vice-Admiral James Gambier).

His paternal grandparents were Jonathan Hurt and Catherine (née Sitwell) Hurt (daughter of William Sitwell). Sitwell was a great-great grandson of ironmaster George Sitwell, "who first put the Sitwell family on the map." His maternal grandparents were Mary (née Stainforth) Warneford and the Rev. Richard Warneford of York.

Sitwell was educated at Christ Church, Oxford, matriculating in 1788, before commencing his Grand Tour.

== Career ==
Sitwell inherited his father's estates in 1793, including Renishaw Hall. He had Joseph Badger of Sheffield make substantial alterations and an addition of the west and east ranges of Renishaw Hall between 1793 and 1808. His brother Francis inherited Barmoor Castle from their father's cousin, Samuel Phipps, and engaged architect John Paterson of Edinburgh in 1801 to build the present substantial castellated Gothic Revival mansion there, incorporating some existing stonework of the old house.

He was Member of Parliament for West Looe from 1796 to 1802. He also was a Justice of the Peace for Derbyshire.

From 4 February 1807 to 24 February 1808, he served as High Sheriff of Derbyshire before he was created 1st Baronet Sitwell, of Renishaw in the County of Derby, on 3 October 1808.

== Personal life ==
Sitwell was twice married. His first marriage was on 1 August 1791 to Alice Parke (d. 1797), daughter of Anne (née Preston) Parke and Thomas Parke of Highfield House, West Derby, Liverpool (previously owned by Charlotte Murray, Duchess of Atholl). Her elder brother was Baron of the Exchequer, James Parke, 1st Baron Wensleydale. Before her death on 3 May 1797, they were the parents of:

- Mary Alice Sitwell (c. 1792–1816), who married her cousin, Sir Charles Wake, 10th Baronet, son of Sir William Wake, 9th Baronet and Mary Sitwell, in 1815. After her death, he married his sister-in-law's sister, Charlotte Tait, daughter of Craufurd Tait, in 1822.
- Anne Elizabeth Sitwell (1793–1856), who married Gen. Sir Frederick Stovin, a son of James Stovin, in 1815. Frederick was the younger brother of Anne's stepmother, Sarah Caroline Stovin, which made Anne Frederick's step-niece.
- Sir George Sitwell, 2nd Baronet (1797–1853), who married Susan Murray Tait, a daughter of Crauford Tait and Susan (née Campbell) Tait (a daughter of Ilay Campbell, Lord Succoth), in 1818.

Sitwell married, secondly, to Sarah Caroline Stovin (1779–1860), on 23 July 1798 at Warmsworth, Yorkshire. She was a daughter of James Stovin of Whitgift Hall, Yorkshire, and elder sister to Gen. Sir Frederick Stovin and Lt.-Gen. Richard Stovin. They had one daughter, who died young.

Sir Sitwell died "of gout in the head" on 14 July 1811 and was succeeded by his only son, George. A memorial to the 1st Baronet is in St Peter and St Paul's Church, Eckington. After his death, his widow married John Smith Wright of Rempstone Hall, Nottinghamshire, on 19 August 1821. She later died at Leicester on 2 November 1860.

=== Descendants ===
Through his son George, he was a grandfather of Sitwell Reresby Sitwell (1820–1862), who became the 3rd Baronet and was, himself, the father of noted eccentric Sir George Sitwell, 4th Baronet and grandfather of Dame Edith Louisa Sitwell (1887–1964), Sir Francis Osbert Sacheverell Sitwell, 5th Baronet (1892–1969), and Sir Sacheverell Reresby Sitwell, 6th Baronet (1897–1988).

Parliament of Great Britain
Preceded by Sir John de la Pole; John Pardoe	Member of Parliament for West Looe; 1796–1801; With: John Buller 1796; John Hookham Frere 1796–1801	Succeeded by Parliament of the United Kingdom
Parliament of the United Kingdom
Preceded by Parliament of Great Britain	Member of Parliament for West Looe; 1801–1802; With: John Hookham Frere	Succeeded by James Buller; Thomas Smith
Honorary titles
Preceded by Francis Bradshaw	High Sheriff of Derbyshire; 1807–1808	Succeeded by Marmaduke Middleton Middleton
Baronetage of the United Kingdom
New creation	Baronet (of Renishaw); 1808–1811	Succeeded by George Sitwell
