= Sir George Sitwell, 2nd Baronet =

British politician and landowner

Sir George Sitwell, Bt

High Sheriff of Derbyshire
- In office 1828–1829
- Preceded by: Edward Sacheverell Chandos-Pole
- Succeeded by: William Evans

Personal details
- Born: George Sitwell; 20 April 1797
- Died: 12 March 1853 (aged 55)
- Spouse: Susan Murray Tait (m. 1818; died 1853)
- Relations: James Parke, 1st Baron Wensleydale (uncle)
- Parent(s): Sir Sitwell Sitwell, 1st Baronet; Alice Parke

Sir George Sitwell, 2nd Baronet (20 April 1797 – 12 March 1853) was a British politician and landowner.

== Early life ==
Sitwell was born on 20 April 1797. He was the only son of Sir Sitwell Sitwell, 1st Baronet and, his first wife, Alice Parke (d. 1797). From his parents' marriage, he had two sisters, Mary Alice Sitwell (who married their cousin, Sir Charles Wake, 10th Baronet, in 1815; after her death, Charles married George's sister-in-law, Charlotte Tait), and Anne Elizabeth Sitwell (who married Gen. Sir Frederick Stovin, a son of James Stovin and younger brother of their stepmother, Sarah Caroline Stovin). After his mother's death in 1797, his father married Sarah Caroline Stovin, daughter of James Stovin and sister to Lt._Gen. Richard Stovin and Gen. Sir Frederick Stovin.

His paternal grandparents were Mary (née Warneford) Hurt and Francis Hurt of Mount Pleasant, Sheffield, who changed his surname to Sitwell in 1777, when he inherited the Derbyshire estates of his mother's cousin. His father was an MP for West Looe from 1796 to 1802, as was his uncle, Francis Sitwell, who was an MP for Berwick-upon-Tweed. His paternal aunt, Mary Sitwell, married Sir William Wake, 9th Baronet. His maternal grandparents were Anne (née Preston) Parke and Thomas Parke of Highfield House, West Derby, Liverpool (previously owned by Charlotte Murray, Duchess of Atholl). His maternal uncle, James Parke, 1st Baron Wensleydale, was Baron of the Exchequer.

== Career ==
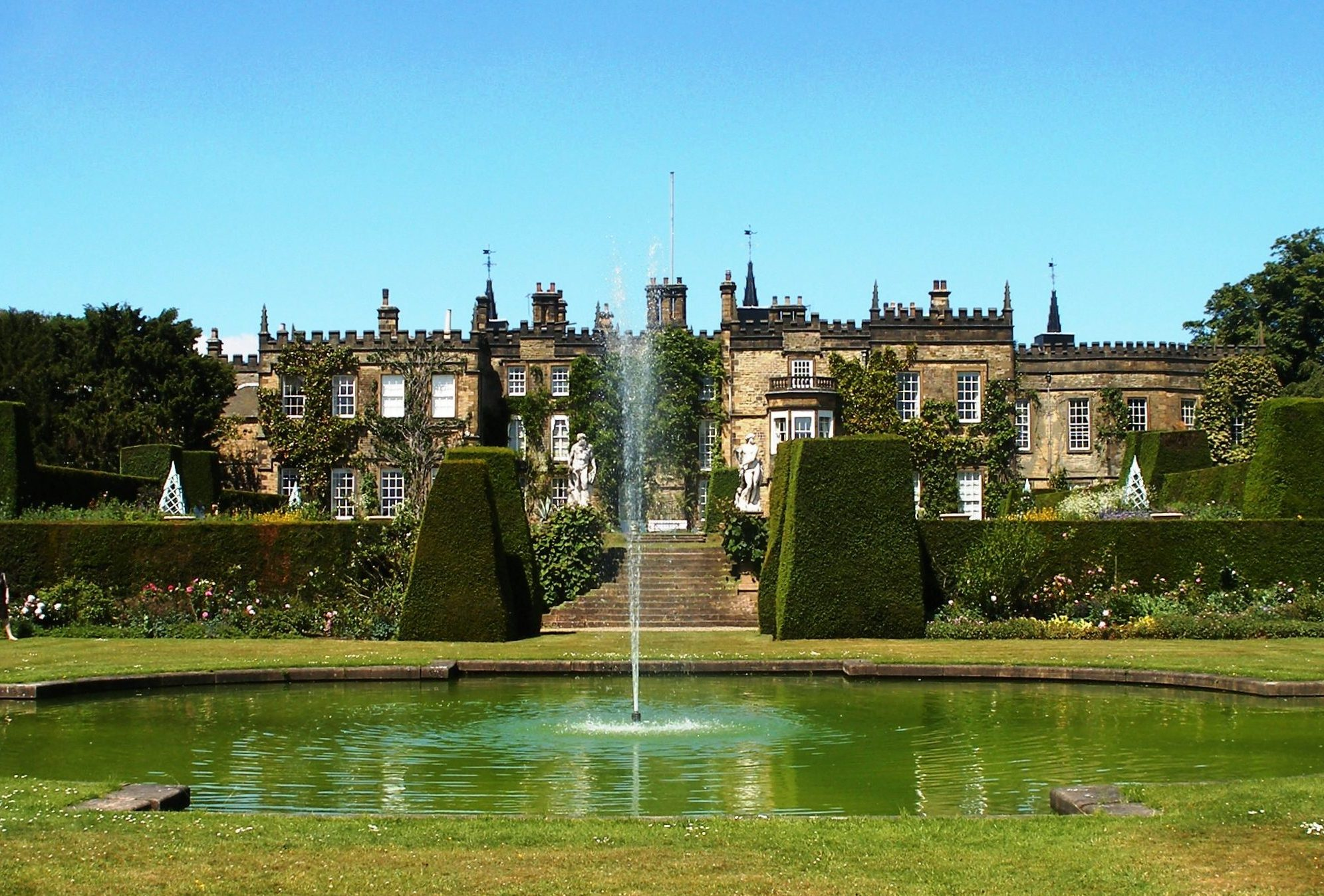
The Sitwell family seat, Renishaw Hall

Upon the death of his father on 14 July 1811, he succeeded as the 2nd Baronet Sitwell, of Renishaw, County of Derby, in the Baronetage of the United Kingdom. Succeeding Edward Sacheverell Chandos-Pole, of Radbourne Hall, he served as High Sheriff of Derbyshire, like his father before him, from 3 February 1828 to 11 February 1829, when he was succeeded by William Evans of Allestree Hall.

The Sitwells leased Balmoral Castle before it became a royal residence. Reportedly, "Horses and politics were his particular indulgence" but he made a number of disastrous investments, and "lost a fortune in the crash of the Sheffield Land Bank."

== Personal life ==
On 1 June 1818 at New Kilpatrick in Dunbartonshire, Scotland, Sitwell was married to artist Susan Murray Tait (1798–1880), daughter of Crauford Tait of Harviestoun and Susan (née Campbell) Tait (a daughter of Ilay Campbell, Lord Succoth). Among her siblings were The Most Rev. Archibald Campbell Tait, Archbishop of Canterbury. Together, they were the parents of:

- Susan Alice Sitwell (1819–1869), who married Col. Wellington Stapleton-Cotton, 2nd Viscount Combermere, son of Stapleton Cotton, 1st Viscount Combermere and Caroline Greville (a daughter of Capt. William Fulke Greville), in 1844. Wellington's sister, Hon. Caroline Stapleton-Cotton, married Arthur Hill, 4th Marquess of Downshire.
- Sir Sitwell Reresby Sitwell, 3rd Baronet (1820–1862), who married Louisa Lucy Hely Hutchinson, daughter of Col. Hon. Henry Hely Hutchinson (brother of the 3rd Earl of Donoughmore) and Harriet Wrightson (a daughter of William Wrightson), in 1857.
- Mary Elizabeth Anne Sitwell (1822–1909), who married Sir George Osborn, 6th Baronet, son of Sir John Osborn, 5th Baronet and Frederica Davers (an illegitimate daughter of Sir Charles Davers, 6th Baronet), in 1871.
- Georgina Caroline Sitwell (1823–1900), who married, as his second wife, Archibald Campbell Swinton, 3rd of Kimmerghame, son of John Campbell Swinton, 2nd of Kimmerghame and Catherine Rannie, in 1856.
- Charlotte Lucy Hurt Sitwell (1826–1907), who married her cousin, Herwald Craufurd Wake, son of Sir Charles Wake, 10th Baronet, and Charlotte Tait, in 1860.
- George Frederick Sitwell (1828–1884), a Captain in the 1st Life Guards; he married Cecilia Fanny Fitzroy, daughter of Henry Fitzroy (a son of Rev. Lord Henry Fitzroy and grandson of the 3rd Duke of Grafton) and Jane Elizabeth Beauclerk (a daughter of Charles George Beauclerk), in 1857.
- Susan Rose Blanche Marion Sitwell (b. 1842), who died unmarried.

Sir George died on 12 March 1853 at age 55 and was succeeded in the baronetcy by his eldest son, Sitwell.

Honorary titles
Preceded by Edward Sacheverell Chandos-Pole	High Sheriff of Derbyshire; 1828–1829	Succeeded by William Evans
Baronetage of the United Kingdom
Preceded by Sitwell Sitwell	Baronet (of Renishaw); 1811–1853	Succeeded by Sitwell Reresby Sitwell
