= Crauford Tait =

Scottish lawyer and landowner (1766–1832)

Crauford Tait WS (8 April 1766 – 2 May 1832) was a 17th/18th century Scottish lawyer, improver and landowner and also a contemporary and friend of Robert Burns.

== Early life ==
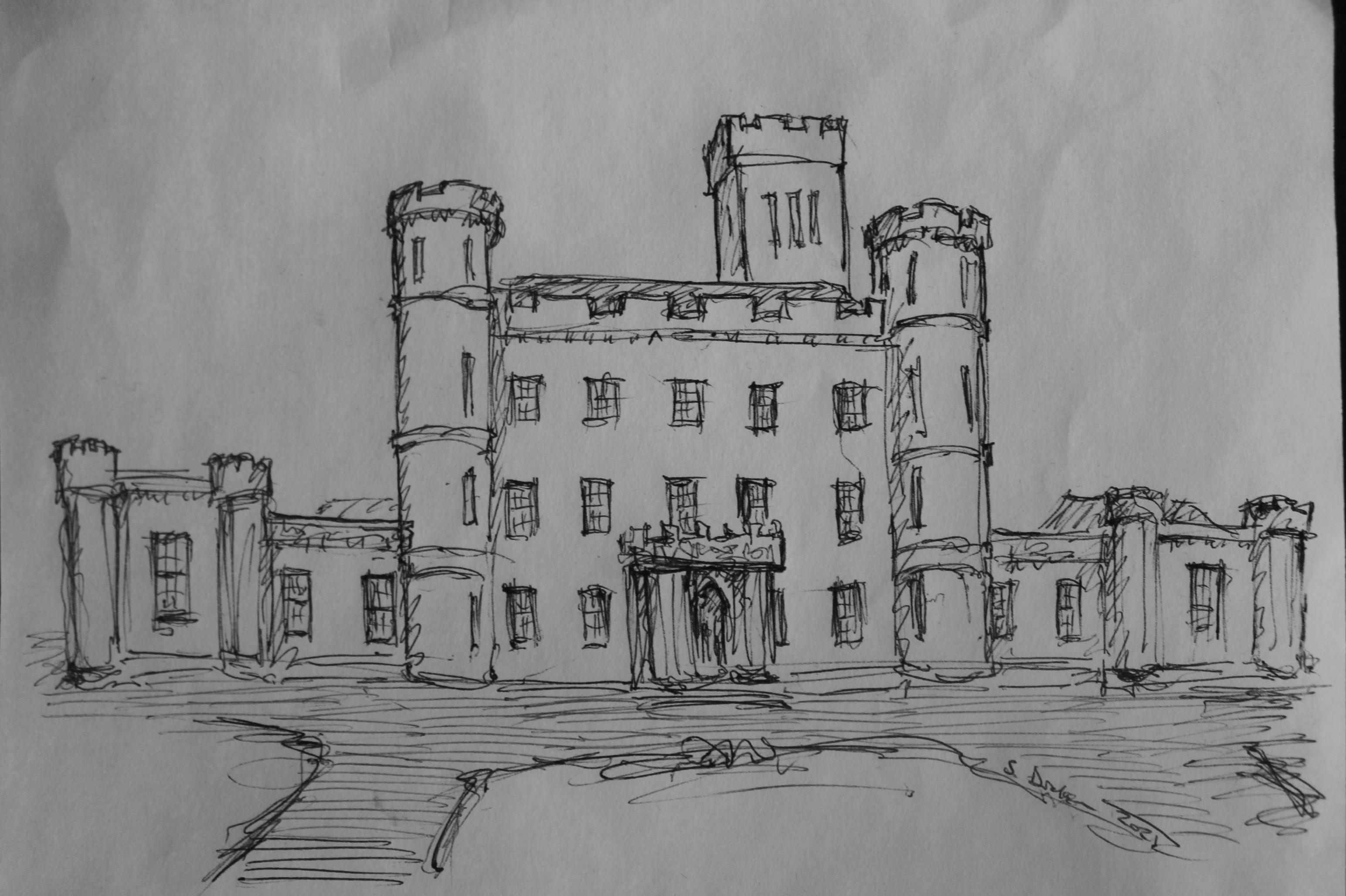
Harvieston House near Dollar

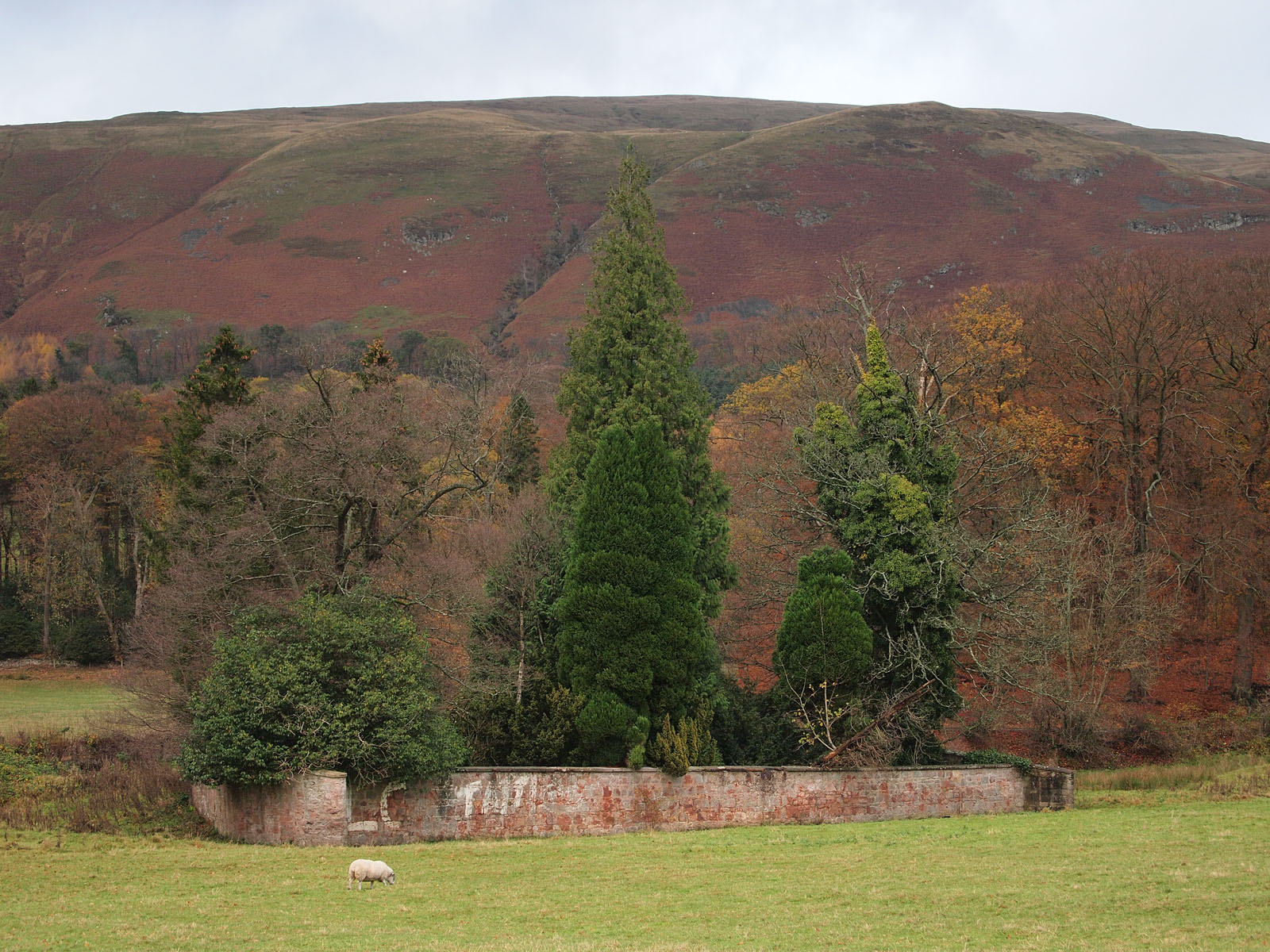
Tait's Tomb near Dollar

Tait was born in Blairlogie in central Scotland on 8 April 1766. He was the son of John Tait, WS of Harviestoun, and his wife Charlotte Murdoch. His father was a lawyer in Edinburgh's New Town from its first construction around 1770.

His father purchased the Harvieston estate just east of Tillicoultry in 1780 and, in 1787, the house was twice visited by Robert Burns during which time he befriended Burns. During the summer visit they took a trip to the Cauldron Linn on the River Devon near Rumbling Bridge which trip Burns described as one of the best days of his life. His father had offices in an Edinburgh townhouse at 28 Queen Street and Crawford both trained and practiced there.

== Career ==
He inherited the Harvieston estate in 1800 on the death of his father. He retained a substantial townhouse at 2 Park Place in Edinburgh which enabled his children to be educated there.

In 1804, he employed John Paterson to rebuild Harviestoun in the Adam style. In 1805 he purchased Dollar Glen and Castle Campbell, from his wife's uncle, consolidating the castle and leaving it as a romantic ruin as was the fashion of the day (Castle Campbell was visible from Harvieston).

In 1810, he was responsible for organising the section of the new turnpike road between Dollar and Tillicoultry (linking Stirling to Kinross and now known as the A91). When the new road was created the old road (just north of the house) became redundant other than as an access to the house.

== Personal life ==
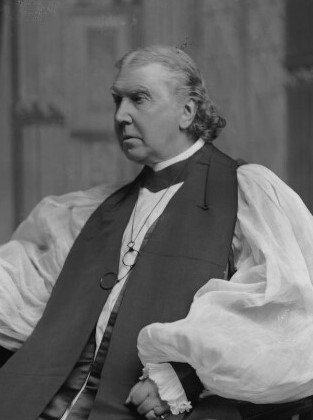
Photograph of his son, Archibald Campbell Tait, the Archbishop of Canterbury, 1870s

On 17 June 1795, Tait married Susan Campbell (1775–1814), daughter of Ilay Campbell, Lord Succoth, and Susan Mary Murray (a daughter of Archibald Murray of Murrayfield and sister of Alexander Murray, Lord Henderland). Together, they were the parents of ten children, including:

- John Tait (1796–1877), who married his first cousin, Mary Amelia Sitwell, daughter of Francis Sitwell, MP for Berwick-upon-Tweed (brother of Sir Sitwell Sitwell, 1st Baronet), and Ann Campbell (a daughter of Lord Succoth), in 1824.
- Susan Murray Tait (1798–1880), who married Sir George Sitwell, 2nd Baronet, only son of Sir Sitwell Sitwell, 1st Baronet and Alice Parke, in 1818.
- Charlotte Tait (1800–1888), who married, as his second wife, Sir Charles Wake, 10th Baronet, son of Sir William Wake, 9th Baronet and Mary Sitwell (sister of Sir Sitwell Sitwell, 1st Baronet), in 1822. Sir Charles' first wife was Mary Alice Sitwell (a daughter of Sir Sitwell Sitwell, 1st Baronet and Alice Parke).
- Archibald Campbell Tait (1811–1882), who became Archbishop of Canterbury; he married Catherine Spooner, daughter of Ven. William Spooner, in 1843.

Tait died on 2 May 1832 and was buried in the family burial enclosure: "Tait's Tomb" south-east of Harvieston House. Harvieston House was demolished in 1971 to avoid rates.

=== Descendants ===
Through his son Archibald, he was a grandfather of Edith Murdoch Tait (1858–1936), who married Randall Davidson who (partly due to Tait's influence) was later also Archbishop of Canterbury.
