= Sir Charles Wake, 10th Baronet =

British landowner

Sir Charles Wake, Bt
- Born: 21 November 1791
- Died: 23 February 1864 (aged 72)
- Spouse(s): Mary Alice Sitwell (m. 1815; died 1816) Charlotte Tait (m. 1822; died 1864)
- Children: 5, including William
- Parent(s): Sir William Wake, 9th Baronet; Mary Sitwell
- Relatives: Sir William Wake, 8th Bt (grandfather); Sir Sitwell Sitwell, 1st Bt (uncle); Sir George Sitwell, 2nd Bt (cousin)

Sir Charles Wake, 10th Baronet (21 November 1791 – 23 February 1864) was a British landowner.

== Early life ==
Wake was born on 21 November 1791. He was the son of Sir William Wake, 9th Baronet and Mary Sitwell. After his mother died in 1791, his father married Jenny Gambier, daughter of Vice-Admiral James Gambier, in 1793. From his father's second marriage, he had several half-siblings, including Cecilia Wake (who married Henry Newcome), the Rev. John William Wake (who died unmarried), and Jane Sophia Wake (who married their cousin, Charles Dunkin Wake).

His paternal grandparents were Sir William Wake, 8th Baronet, MP for Bedford, and Mary Fenton (a daughter of Richard Fenton). His maternal grandparents were Mary (née Warneford) Sitwell and Francis Hurt of Mount Pleasant, Sheffield, who changed his surname to Sitwell in 1777, when he inherited the Renishaw Hall, Derbyshire estates of his mother's cousin. His maternal uncle was Sir Sitwell Sitwell, 1st Baronet and, through him, he was a first cousin of Anne Elizabeth Sitwell (who married Gen. Sir Frederick Stovin) and Sir George Sitwell, 2nd Baronet (who married Charles' second wife's sister, Susan Murray Tait, also a daughter of Crauford Tait).

== Career ==
Upon the death of his father on 27 January 1846, he succeeded as the 10th Baronet Wake, of Clevedon, Somerset and Piddington, County of Northampton, in the Baronetage of England.

== Personal life ==
On 23 August 1815, he married his cousin, Mary Alice Sitwell (c. 1792–1816), a daughter of his maternal uncle Sir Sitwell Sitwell, 1st Baronet and, his first wife, Alice Parke (a daughter of Thomas Parke of Highfield House, West Derby, Liverpool and sister to Baron of the Exchequer, James Parke, 1st Baron Wensleydale). She died, without issue, less than a year later on 3 February 1816.

=== Second marriage ===
He married for the second time, on 1 June 1822, to Charlotte Tait (1800–1888), daughter of Crauford Tait and the former Susan Campbell (a daughter of Ilay Campbell, Lord Succoth). Charlotte's younger brother was Archibald Campbell Tait, the Archbishop of Canterbury. Another brother, John Tait, married their first cousin, Mary Amelia Sitwell (daughter of Francis Sitwell, MP for Berwick-upon-Tweed and Ann Campbell). Together, they were the parents of:

- Sir William Wake, 11th Baronet (1823–1865), who married Margaret Anne Fricker, daughter of Henry Fricker and Margaret Nonchett, in 1844. (Note: "As a result of his marriage, he was confined by his father on a pretext of insanity but escaped in the packing case of a piano which he had ordered to be sent to his place of confinement then got sent back.")
- Charles Wake (1824–1890), an Admiral in the Royal Navy; he married Emma St. Aubyn, daughter of Sir Edward St. Aubyn, 1st Baronet and Emma Knollys (sister to Gen. Sir William Knollys), in 1860.
- Drury Wake (1827–1891), a barrister who married Louisa Julia Harriet Nethercote, daughter of Henry Osmond Nethercote and Charlotte Frances Allix, in 1874.
- Herwald Craufurd Wake (1829–1901), who married his first cousin, Charlotte Lucy Hurt Sitwell, a daughter of Sir George Sitwell, 2nd Baronet and Susan Murray Tait, in 1860.
- Edward Baldwin Wake (1833–1883), a Lt.-Col. in the 21st Hussars; he married Mary Mangles, daughter of Ross Donnelly Mangles and Harriet Newcome, in 1861. After her death, he married Ellen Mary Nethercote, also a daughter of Henry Osmond Nethercote and Charlotte Frances Allix, in 1871.

Sir Charles died on 23 February 1864 at age 72 and was succeeded in the baronetcy by his eldest son, William.

== Notes ==
Baronetage of England
Preceded by William Wake	Baronet (of Clevedon); 1846–1864	Succeeded by William Wake
