= Cauldron Linn (River Devon) =

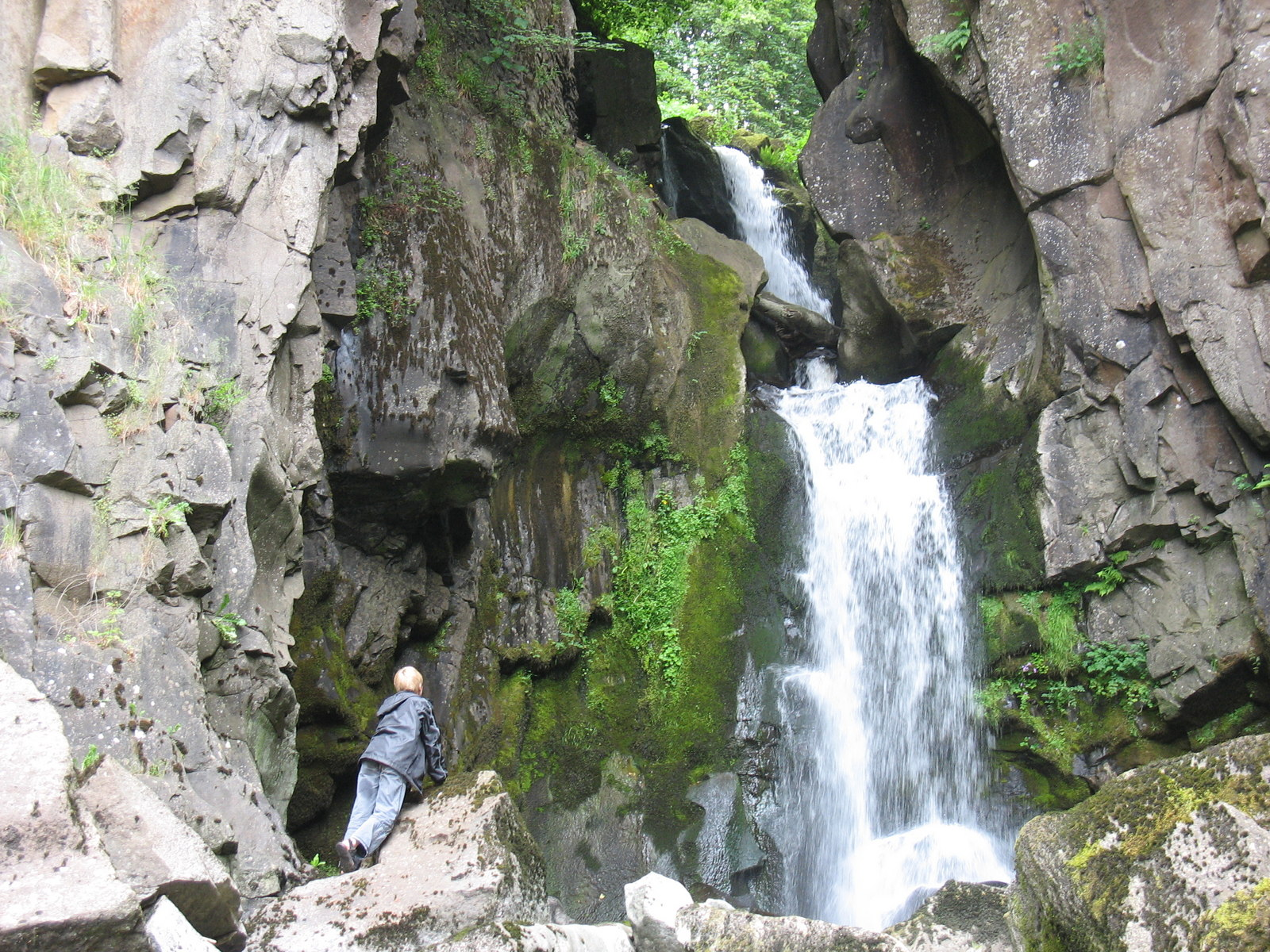
- The Cauldron Linn

- Location within Scotland
- OS grid: NT004988
- Coordinates: 56.17141°N 3.60570°W
- Watercourse: River Devon, Clackmannanshire

Cauldron Linn, or Caldron Linn, is a waterfall on the River Devon on the border between Clackmannanshire and Perth and Kinross in Scotland.

== Location and description ==
Caldron Linn is about a mile below Rumbling Bridge, and can be accessed through fields by Powmill, with a 150 ft slippery descent to reach it. The height of its fall was lessened in 1886 by rock fall.

The Scottish Tourist, an 1838 guidebook, says of the waterfall:

Here are two cataracts, distant from each other 28 yards. The upper fall, thirty-four feet in height, declines a little from the perpendicular; the rocks rise out of the channel, and there is one like a pillar, horizontal at the top, by which many persons have passed from one side to the other. Between these falls, the river has formed three round cavities, having the appearance of large caldrons or boilers. In the first, the water is perpetually agitated as if it were boiling; in the second, it is covered with a constant foam; in the third, which is the largest, being 22 feet in diameter, it appears as if spread out in a large cooler.

These cavities are separated from each other by ledges of rock; they communicate, not by the water running over their brim, but by apertures about middle depth in their ledges, wrought out in the course of ages by the action of the water. The lower caldron discharges the water into the last fall through a similar aperture, having the appearance of a door or large window hewn out of the rock. Through this opening, the river rushes in one vast and rapid torrent over a stupendous pile of perpendicular rocks, into a deep and romantic glen.

The noise of its fall is tremendous, and the rocks seem to tremble to their centre, while the mind of the spectator is deeply affected by emotions of wonder and admiration. The height of the rock is 88 feet, and the fall 44.

The most complete view of this magnificent scene, and of the deep and finely-wooded dell, is from the bottom of the great fall, where it has the appearance of a prodigious fountain gushing from the solid rock. It is beheld to most advantage between one and two o'clock in the afternoon, when the sun shines directly in front of it. A vapour constantly ascends from the pool; in sunshine this vapour exhibits all the colours of the rainbow, which, by the constant agitation of the air, disperse, and again appear in the most beautiful combinations.

The Caldron Linn, in short, is perhaps the greatest natural curiosity, and certainly one of the most sublime objects in Scotland. More than twenty years ago [c.1818] the following extraordinary occurrence happened at this place: a fox, which was hard pursued by a pack of hounds, led them along the banks of the river, till he reached the boiling caldron, which he crossed; the dogs attempted to follow, but being unacquainted with the path, they fell, one after another, into the caldron, and were drowned. Several years ago, a gentleman fell into the same caldron, and was extricated with the greatest difficulty.

The water flow of the Linn is now diminished by a recent hydro-electric scheme commissioned in 1993.

== History ==
The Linn was famously visited by Robert Burns in 1787 in the company of his friends Gavin Hamilton and Crauford Tait of Harvireston.

== See also ==
- Waterfalls of Scotland
