= Susan Pleydell =

Susan Pleydell was the nom de plume of the Scottish-born novelist Susan Senior, née Susan Syme (1907–1986). She was a schoolmistress by profession and published a number of novels between 1959 and 1977.

== Background ==
Susan Syme was born into a farming family at Milnathort, near Kinross. In her teens, the family moved to Dollar in Clackmannanshire and thence a few miles east to Rumbling Bridge.

Syme studied piano at the Royal College of Music. While teaching at a girls’ school at Bexhill-on-Sea, Sussex, she met John Robert Murray Senior, head of history at Shrewsbury School from 1932–51, whom she married in 1935. She taught the piano at Shrewsbury for some years. In the 1950s, her husband became headmaster of Bury Grammar School near Manchester and then of Monmouth School from 1956–9.

== Literary career ==
=== The Ledenham stories ===
==== Summer Term ====
Pleydell’s first novel, Summer Term, which appeared in 1959, was described half a century later by bookseller and publisher Shirley Neilson as "a sort of school story". It was set at Ledenham, a boys’ public school in the fictional county of Ledshire in the north of England, and recounted love and intrigue among its adult residents following the simultaneous arrival of a Scottish rugby international as a new mathematics master and the headmaster’s niece, a beautiful twenty-year-old sophisticate from London. The impact of the latter had some similarities to that at Oxford of Max Beerbohm's Zuleika Dobson (1911).

==== A Young Man's Fancy ====
A sequel, A Young Man’s Fancy (1962), reintroduced a number of characters from the earlier novel. Set in the habitually morose spring term – "for which there is nothing to be said at all" – and against the backdrop of persistent snowfalls, the book revolved around various additional difficulties that threatened to inhibit the smooth running of Ledenham. These included the headmaster's engagement of an untrustworthy local girl as his temporary secretary; misunderstandings about matters of the heart affecting, among others, his youngest daughter and some of his junior masters; the nomination of an egocentric industrial magnate to a vacancy on the school's governing body; and melodramatic allegations by the prospective governor that threatened the careers of the headmaster and one of his colleagues.

==== Model for Mrs. Fielding? ====
According to her son, Alan Senior, Pleydell deployed her own experience to the writing of these stories, although it is unclear to what extent she was the model for Hester Fielding, the wife of Ledenham's headmaster (or "Beak"), Hugh Fielding. In Summer Term, Mrs. Fielding's absence in Italy was a crucial part of the plot, providing an opening for her eldest daughter and visiting niece to demonstrate their organisational capabilities. However, in the sequel, she was very much in evidence, attending to all manner of domestic matters, acting supportively as a hostess and confidante, and making, at times, subtly cutting observations on questions of tradition and etiquette (as when the temporary secretary and her mother failed to occupy pews reserved in the chapel for visitors).

=== Other works ===
Pleydell wrote a further eight novels, A Festival for Gilbert and The Glenvarroch Gathering (both 1960), Good Red Herring (1962), Griselda (1964), The Road to the Harbour (1966), Jethro’s Mill (1974), Pung of Dragons (1975) and Brighouse Hotel (1977).

Pleydell died in 1986. New editions of Summer Term and A Young Man's Fancy, long out of print, were published in 2010–11 by Greyladies Books of Edinburgh, the former containing a biographical note by her son. Greyladies re-published The Glenvarroch Gathering in 2013.
