= Caldron Linn =

Caldron Linn or Cauldron Linn can refer to the following waterfalls

- Cauldron Linn (River Devon), Scotland
- Caldron Linn, on Annet Burn, tributary of River Teith (see Waterfalls of Scotland)
- Caldron Linn (Murtaugh, Idaho), USA
