= Andrew Orr (stationer) =

Scottish wholesale stationer (1801–1872)

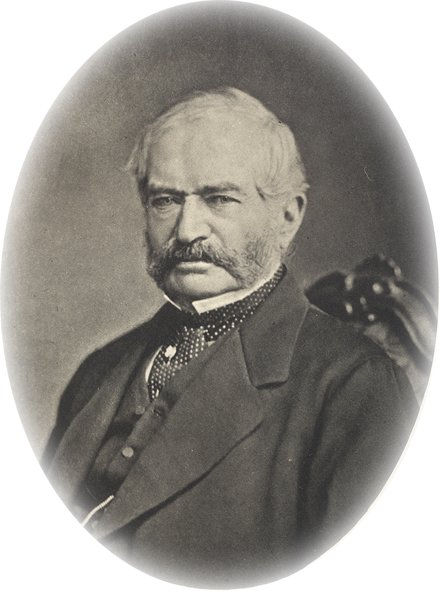
Sir Andrew Orr

Sir Andrew Orr (1801–1872) was a Scottish wholesale stationer who served as Lord Provost of Glasgow from 1854 to 1857.

== Life ==
He was born in Glasgow in 1801. His father was Francis Orr, who was originally a pocket book maker at 15 Princes Street, and later became the founder of Francis Orr & Sons stationers.

He became a town councillor in 1842 and was elected Lord Provost in 1854. He was knighted by Queen Victoria in 1858. During his term in office, he lived at 5 Blythswood Square, previously the home of Dr John Burns. Orr's neighbours included the Smith family, including the accused murderer Madeleine Smith.

From 1849 to 1871 he was also Chairman of the Glasgow and South Western Railway Company.

He retired to Harviestoun Castle near Dollar, Clackmannanshire which he had bought in 1859 together with Castle Campbell.

He was painted by Sir Francis Grant in 1871.

He died at Bridge of Allan on 19 April 1874. He was interred in the Glasgow Necropolis on 25 April 1874. His wife and infant child predeceased him.
