= Patrick Campbell, Lord Monzie =

Scottish judge and Senator of the College of Justice

Patrick Campbell, Lord Monzie (1675–1751) was a Scottish judge and Senator of the College of Justice.

== Life ==
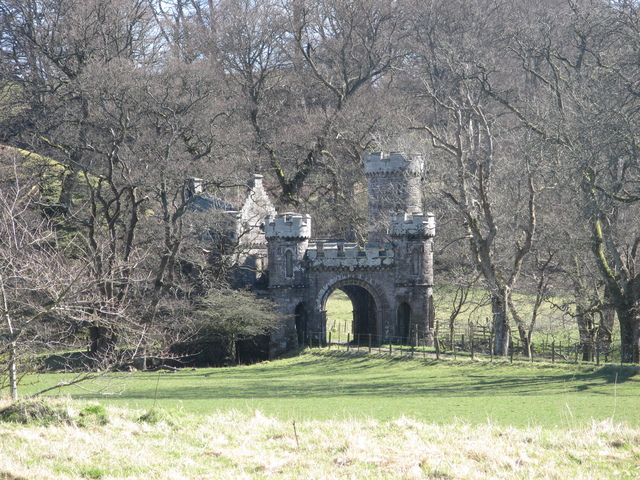
Monzie Castle gatehouse with the original Monzie Castle tower house behind

He was born in Monzie Castle, two miles north-east of Crieff, in Perthshire the second son of Ann Oliphant and her husband Colin Campbell, 4th Laird of Lagvinsheock and Monzie who acquired Monzie in 1666 through the influence of King Charles II. Monzie Castle is a two-storey and attic, L-plan tower house, dating from 1634.

Trained as a lawyer Patrick passed the Scottish bar as an advocate in 1722 served on a committee for the Faculty of Advocates.

In June 1727 he was elected a Senator of the College of Justice in place of the late Alexander Ogilvy, Lord Forglen. He adopted the name of Lord Monzie.

His most notable duty arose in 1728: being chosen by the Equivalent Company to oversee the distribution of £400,000 (£57 billion in 2023) to those (or their next of kin) who lost money in the disastrous Darien Scheme. This act was pivotal in the Union of 1707 which united Scotland and England. Linked strongly to this, was the creation in 1727 of the Royal Bank of Scotland of which his cousin, Daniel Campbell, was its first Secretary. Also as part of the deal for Patrick's services, he was given the large office building which had formerly belonged to the Company of Scotland who had run the Darien Scheme, this being on Mills Square (not to be confused with the still extant Mylne's Square) on the Royal Mile in Edinburgh.

He died on 1 August 1751 and his place as Senator was filled by Henry Home, Lord Kames.

Monzie Castle left the Campbell family in 1869.

== Family ==
He married Catherine Erskine, daughter of Sir Charles Erskine, 1st Baronet, of Alva and sister of his legal colleague Charles Erskine, Lord Tinwald. Monzie Castle passed to his only son, also Patrick Campbell, on his death.
