= Barmoor Castle =

Country house in Lowick, Northumberland, England

Coordinates: 55.65245°N 2.00601°W

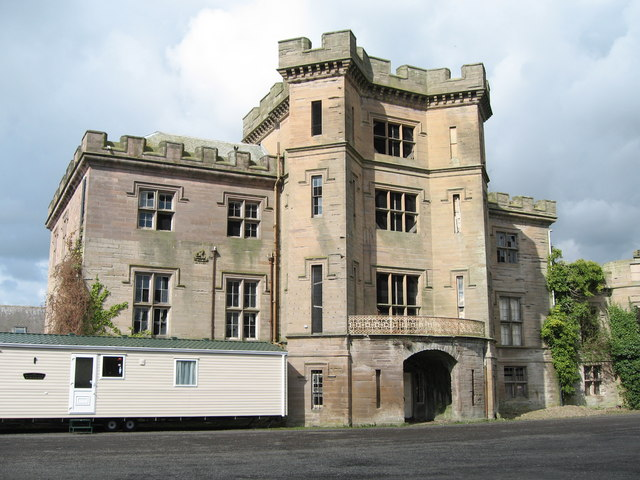
- Barmoor Castle.
- Interactive map of the Barmoor Castle area

General information
- Classification: Grade II*
- Completed: 1801
- Owner: Lamb family

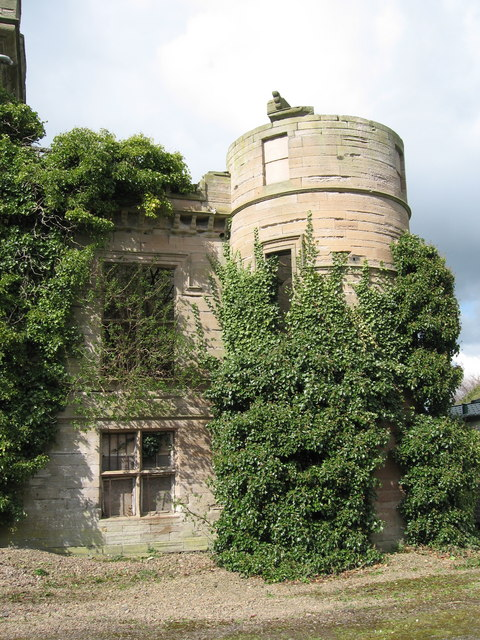
The overgrown northeast tower of Barmoor Castle

Barmoor Castle ( grid reference NT99723988) is a privately owned 19th-century country house built on an ancient site in Northumberland. It is a Grade II* listed building. As at 2008 the decaying building is officially listed on the English Heritage Buildings at Risk Register.

== Muschamp family ==
After the Norman Conquest the Manor of Barmoor was granted to the Muschamp family who built a tower house on the site. A licence to crenellate the house was granted by Edward III on 17 May 1341. A 1541 survey described the house as ' in extreme decay and almost ruinous for lack of reparations'. Some repairs and improvements were carried out in 1584 but the Muschamps experienced financial difficulties, and following the death of George Muschamp in 1649 the estate was sold to William Carr of Etal to satisfy the demands of creditors.

== Sitwell family ==
After 1702 the estate changed hands several times until in 1791 it was acquired by inheritance by Francis Hurt Sitwell. The Sitwells engaged architect John Paterson of Edinburgh and in 1801 built the present substantial castellated Gothic Revival mansion on the site of and incorporating some existing stonework of the old house. Later improvements and extensions were carried out c.1892 by Brigadier general William Henry Sitwell. From 1899 to 1913 the castle was rented by the banker and local historian Thomas Hodgkin.

== Present day ==
The present owner occupiers, the Lamb family, acquired the house and 200 acres (0.81 km^{2}) in the 1980s from where they operate a caravan and holiday park.
