= St Paul's Church, Perth =

St Paul's Church
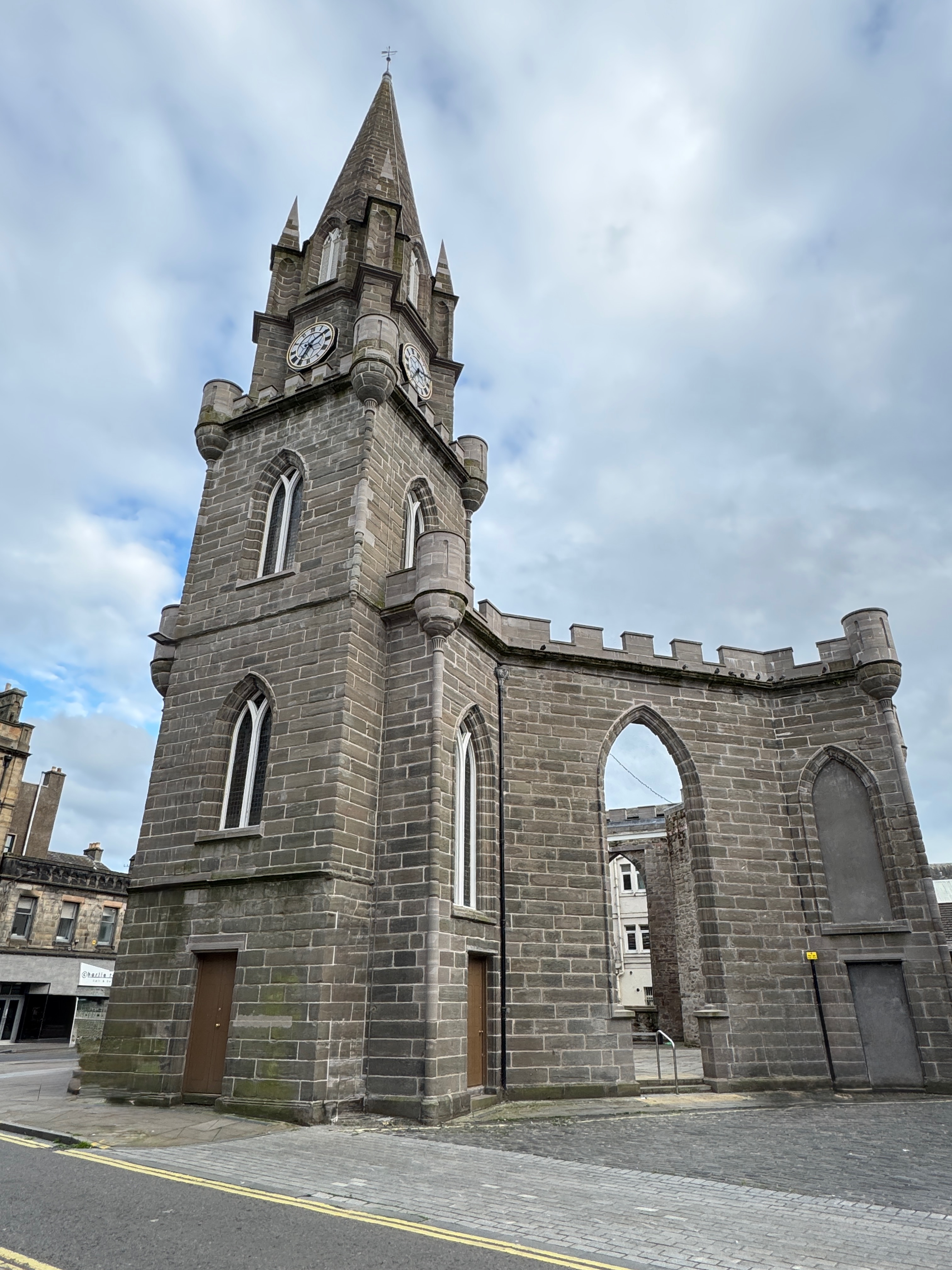
- The church in 2024, looking southeast from the Old High Street
- St Paul's Church
- 56°23′47″N 3°26′05″W
- Location: Old High Street, Perth, Perth and Kinross
- Country: Scotland

History
- Status: closed

Architecture
- Functional status: used
- Heritage designation: Category B listed building
- Designated: 20 May 1965
- Architect: John Paterson
- Completed: 1807 (219 years ago)

St Paul's Church is a former church building located in Perth, Perth and Kinross, Scotland. Standing in St Paul's Square, on the Old High Street, at its junction with South Methven Street, it was completed in 1807. The work of architect John Paterson, it is now a Category B listed building. It was one of the first churches to be built in Perth after the Reformation, sparked by John Knox's sermon at the nearby St John's Kirk in 1559.

The church closed in 1986, and fell into a state of dereliction.

In June 2021, the church's bell rang out for the first time in thirty years, completing a £2.2-million restoration of the church into an outdoor performance space.

== St Paul's Square ==
The square in which the church stands is also part of the Category B listing.

Perth band Fiction Factory frequented Bandwagon Music Supplies, which was located behind the church in St Paul's Square. "They would come into my shop wanting to hear their recording on my wee cassette recorder that turned out to be a number six single that still gets played today," said Pete Caban, the shop's owner. The shop closed in 2020, after 37 years in business, with Caban blaming the delayed work on the church and resultant drop in foot traffic to the square.

The building of the former Bandwagon Music shop now houses a gallery and gift shop.

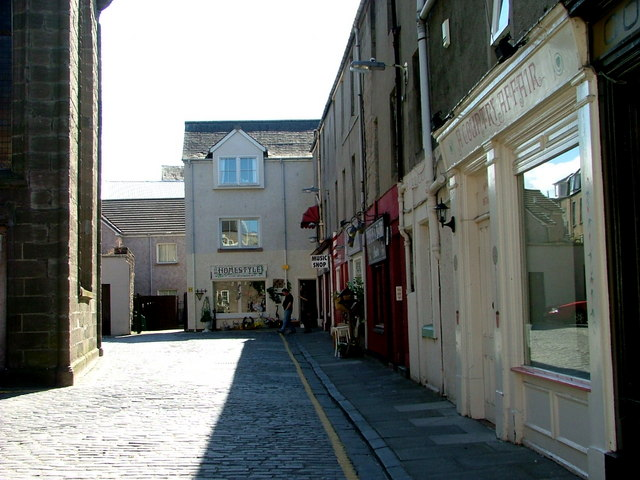
Looking down the western elevation of the church into the square

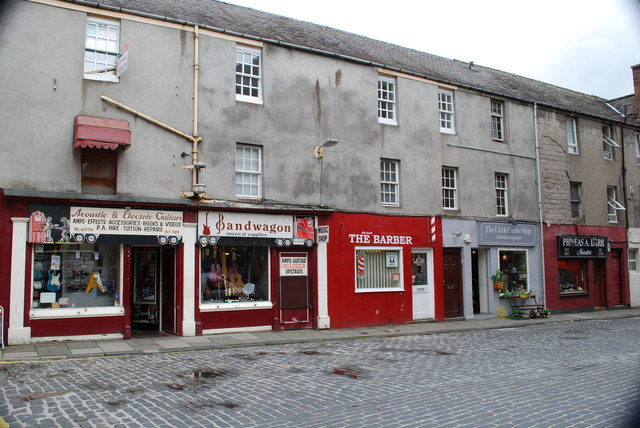
Shops, including the now-defunct Bandwagon Music Supplies, in the square

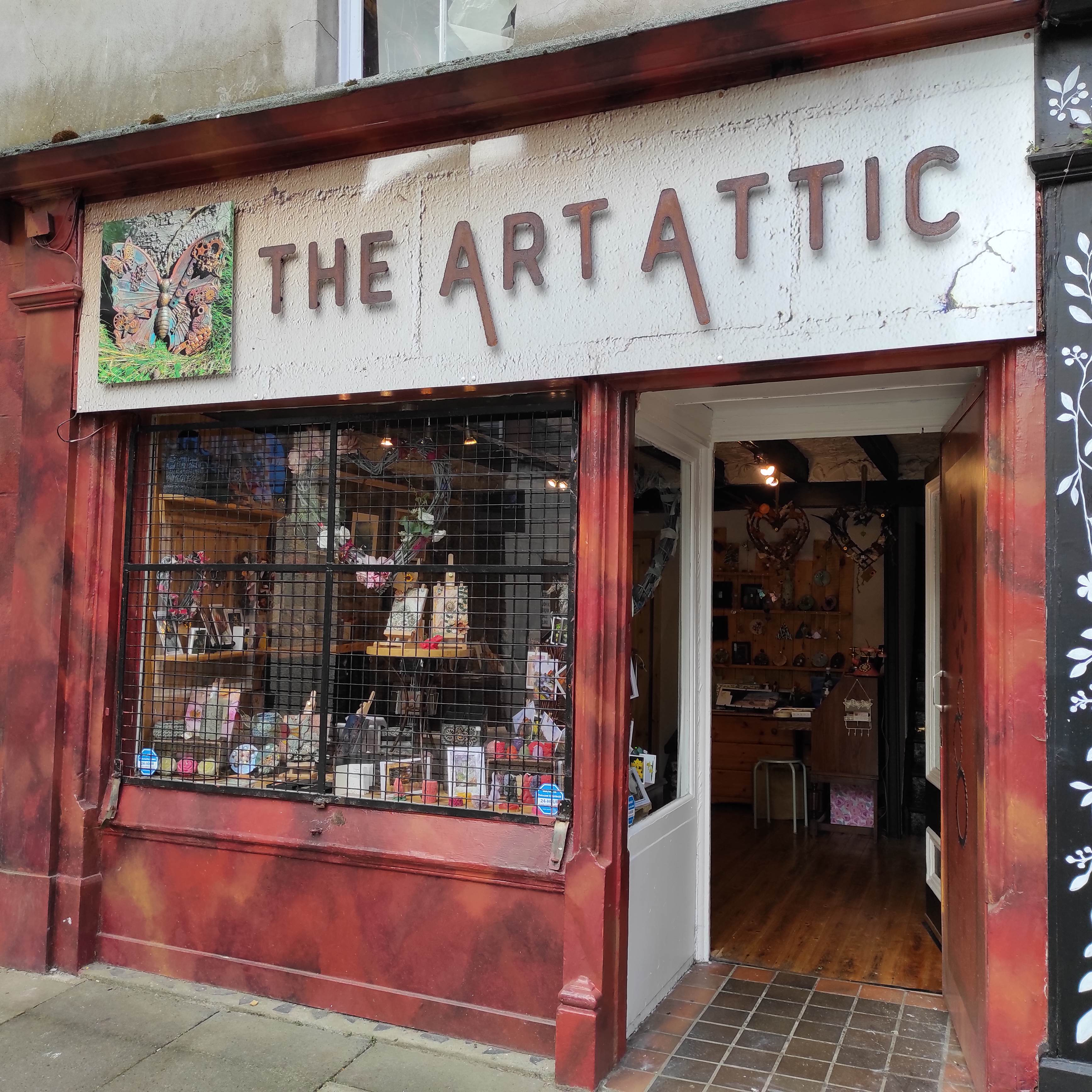
The Art Attic gallery occupied the former Bandwagon space, as of 2022

== See also ==
- List of listed buildings in Perth, Scotland
