= Monzie Castle =

Castellated mansion in Perth and Kinross, Scotland

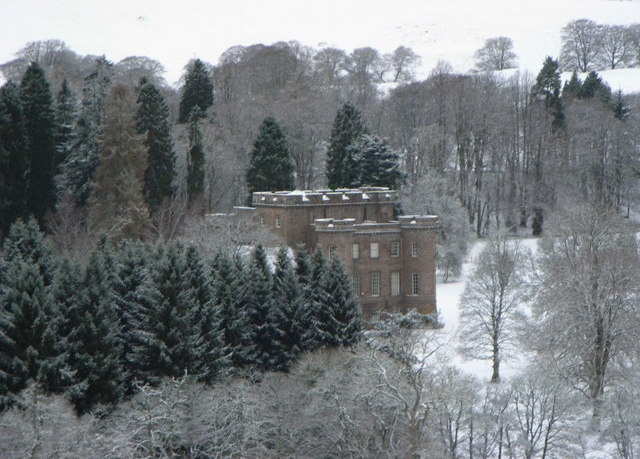
- Monzie Castle

Location
- Coordinates: 56.3993°N 3.8262°W

Site history
- Built: c.17th century

Inventory of Gardens and Designed Landscapes in Scotland
- Official name: Monzie Castle
- Designated: 31 March 2006
- Reference no.: GDL00290

Monzie Castle is a castellated mansion, near Monzie in Perth and Kinross, Scotland that incorporates an L-plan, early 17th-century building that was enlarged in 1797–1800. It is a category A listed building.

The current house interior dates from 1908 following the destruction of the later portion of the mansion by fire. The exterior splits into two clear sections: the original L-plan house of 1634 and the 1790 section by John Paterson, a pupil of Robert Adam.

== History ==
Margaret Scott, heiress of Monzie, deeded three-quarters of the lands in 1613 to her son, James Graeme, who later built a house on the property. The house has a marriage lintel (in fact in this instance a pediment) dating from around 1635 bearing the figure of a man with a moustache holding corn in one hand and a bible in the other flanked by the letters M, I and G. M was Marjory the wife of James Graeme (IG). At the base is a Greek inscription translating as "I am led by scripture". Two further pediments are one in Latin and one in Hebrew: ""Seek the One I worship" and "I have found his Prosperity". James Graeme died at the Battle of Philiphaugh in 1645.

The building may have incorporated an earlier fortalice as there are garderobes in the walls of the west wing. The estate was sold to Colin Campbell of Lagvinshoch in 1666 and passed from him to his son Patrick Campbell, Lord Monzie. His descendant, General Alexander Campbell, MP, enlarged the house by adding a much larger castellated building on its east side in 1797–1800 that was designed by John Patterson. The house was inherited by Charles Maitland-Makgill-Crichton in 1900. The interior of the addition was gutted by a fire in 1908 and rebuilt by Sir Robert Lorimer over the next four years in his own style.

== Description ==
The original house was a rubble-walled three-storey building built in a L-shape. The second-storey windows rose through the eaves to pedimented dormerheads. A similar pediment surrounds the entrance on the west side. Its lintel bears three weathered heraldic shields, the initials of Graeme and his wife Marjory, and the date 1634, presumably its date of construction. A scale-and-platt staircase gives access to the upper storeys. A large fireplace on the ground floor has a swagged lintel carved with a heraldic panel and the date 1634.

== World Scout Moot ==
In 1939 Monzie Castle was the site of the 3rd World Rover Moot, attended by 3,500 Scouts from 42 nations.

== Gallery ==
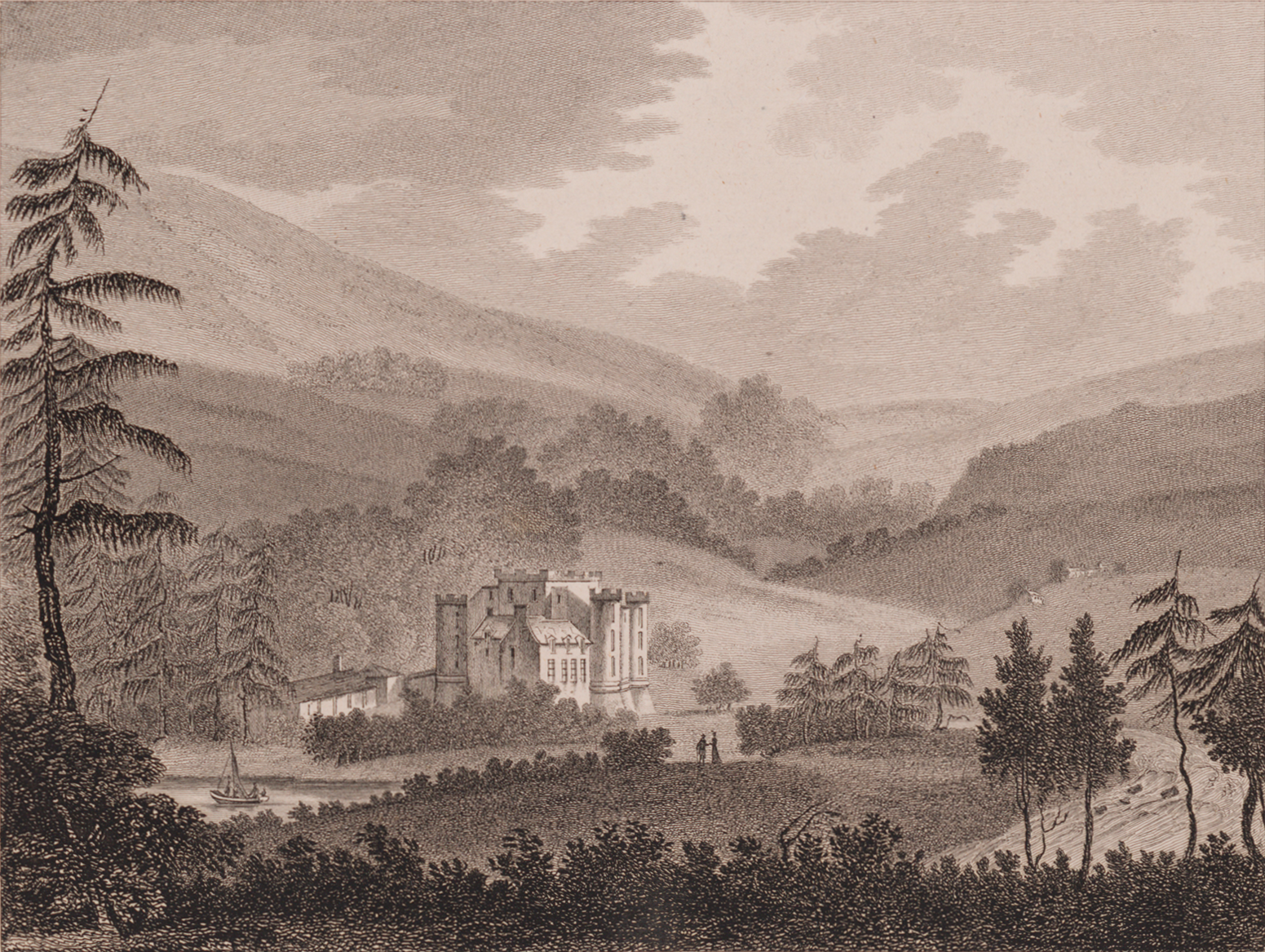
Sketch of Monzie Castle by John Claude Nattes, 1804

== Bibliography ==
- Gifford, John (2007). Perth and Kinross. The Buildings of Scotland. New Haven: Yale University Press. ISBN 978-0-300-10922-1.
