= A977 road =

Road in Scotland

The A977 is an A road in Scotland, connecting the Kincardine Bridge in Fife to the M90 motorway at Kinross.

== Route ==
The A977 runs between the M90 junction 6 and a roundabout at the southern end of the Kincardine Bridge

== Places along the route ==
The road passes through several villages and hamlets on its route. Approaching from the south, it passes through Forestmill, Blairingone, Powmill, Crook of Devon, before reaching the M90.

== Residents' concerns ==
The new Clackmannanshire Bridge has led to an increase in heavy traffic using the A977 to reach the M90 motorway providing a quicker route for North East traffic from Glasgow and the west. The road has also become a favourable route for many UK and European hauliers in recent years seeking an alternative route to avoid DSVA enforcement activities on the M9 at Stirling. This has caused to concern among people who live in communities on the road. MSP Liz Smith raised the matter in the Scottish Parliament but was told that this was a council matter. She has since raised the matter with Perth and Kinross Council.

A package of traffic mitigation measures was approved in February 2010.

== See also ==
- Perth and Kinross Council
- County of Kinross
- Clackmannanshire
