= Blairingone =

Village in Perth and Kinross, Scotland

Coordinates: 56.153023°N 3.637136°W

Blairingone: Scottish Gaelic: Blàr nan Con
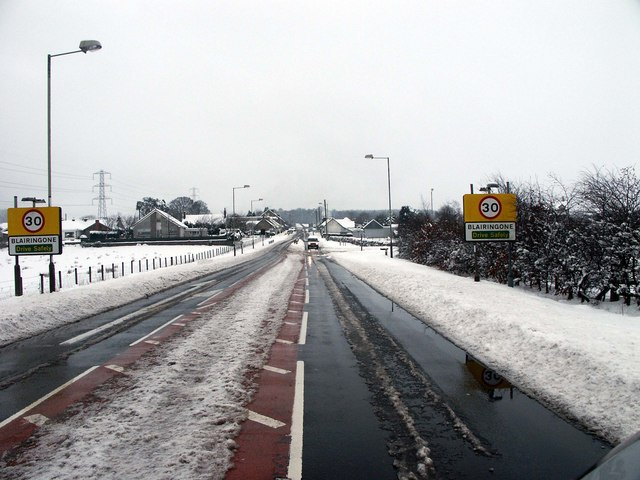
- Blairingone in winter

- Location within Perth and Kinross
- OS grid reference: NS984968
- Council area: Perth and Kinross
- Lieutenancy area: Perth and Kinross
- Country: Scotland
- Sovereign state: United Kingdom
- Post town: DOLLAR
- Postcode district: FK14
- Dialling code: 01577
- Police: Scotland
- Fire: Scottish
- Ambulance: Scottish
- UK Parliament: Perth and Kinross-shire
- Scottish Parliament: Ochil

Blairingone (from Scottish Gaelic: Blàr nan Con "moor of the hounds") is a village in Perth and Kinross, Scotland. It lies on the A977 road at its intersection with Vicar's Bridge Road near the extreme south-westerly point of the region, approximately 3 miles (5 kilometres) southeast of Dollar. The Arndean agricultural estate lies about 1 mile (1.5 kilometres) northeast, near the River Devon.

== Schools ==
Blairingone Primary School was located in Blairingone.

== History ==
Blairingone is located in the parish of Fossoway and is part of the former county of Kinross-shire.

It is the last village in the county of Perth and Kinross. Blairingone in Gaelic may be blàr an gobha or blàr an con, field or muir of the smith or dogs.

Materials such as limestone, alum, iron-ore, whinstone and sulphur, as well as coal were mined here. The Fossoway area and over into Fife contained the most ancient coal mining operations in Scotland. During the 1700s a waggonway complex included a track from Blairingone for carrying coal which also connected the North Fife coal fields and the limeburners at Limekilns on the Forth of Forth.

The monks from Culross Abbey obtained their coal from this area and visiting nuns were accommodated at the still occupied "Ladieshall" on the Vicars Bridge road out of the village. Livestock drovers from the north and south passed through Blairingone on their way to the upper Forth ferry and were often known to take refreshment at one of the three inns in the village, only one of which is left and was called the 'Devonvale Inn', in recent years renamed The Mart Inn.

== Blairingone Church ==
- 1836 Erected
- 1838 opened as a Chapel of Ease for the parish of Fossoway.
- "Call to the minister" Rev William G Mitchell was the first minister to take charge
- 1860 granted autonomy
- 1939 - 1958 Bartholomew "Bert" McLaughlin minister
- 1958 Linked to Saline
- 1993 Saline & Blairingone parish formed
- 2004 deconsecrated
- 2006 renovations started with interest from Channel 5 (Linda Jackson & Paula Ketterer)
- c.2008 The Church of Scotland officially made the building redundant
- 2012 residential conversion was completed by Profile Projects
- 2020 War memorial moved from front of church to back wall of graveyard

The Church has two impressive stained glass windows on the East and West faces by James Ballantyne 1806-77 who founded Ballantine of Edinburgh in 1838 and whose works is featured in the kirks of Greyfriars, St Giles, Dunfermline Abbey, Wallace monument, Scott Monument and, having won a public competition in 1843 to design the windows for the House of Lords in London.

It was graded C listed building (LB11467) on 9/6/81 with the following description: "Dated 1836 above S. gable window. T-plan. Random rubble, Slated roof. Round headed windows. Interior refurnished"

On the South face there is an Ordnance Survey Bench Mark (OSBM) serial number 8944. They were established by the Ordnance Survey in the UK to record heights above the Ordnance Datum (mean sea level). Over 1/2 million marks were installed between 1831 and 1993 but only some half of these remain today. They were no longer used in the 1980s when GPS took over. Marks were in the form of simple cut marks, flush brackets (of which this is one; some 3000 were installed).

== See also ==
- Perth and Kinross
- Scotland
