= John Paterson (architect) =

Scottish architect

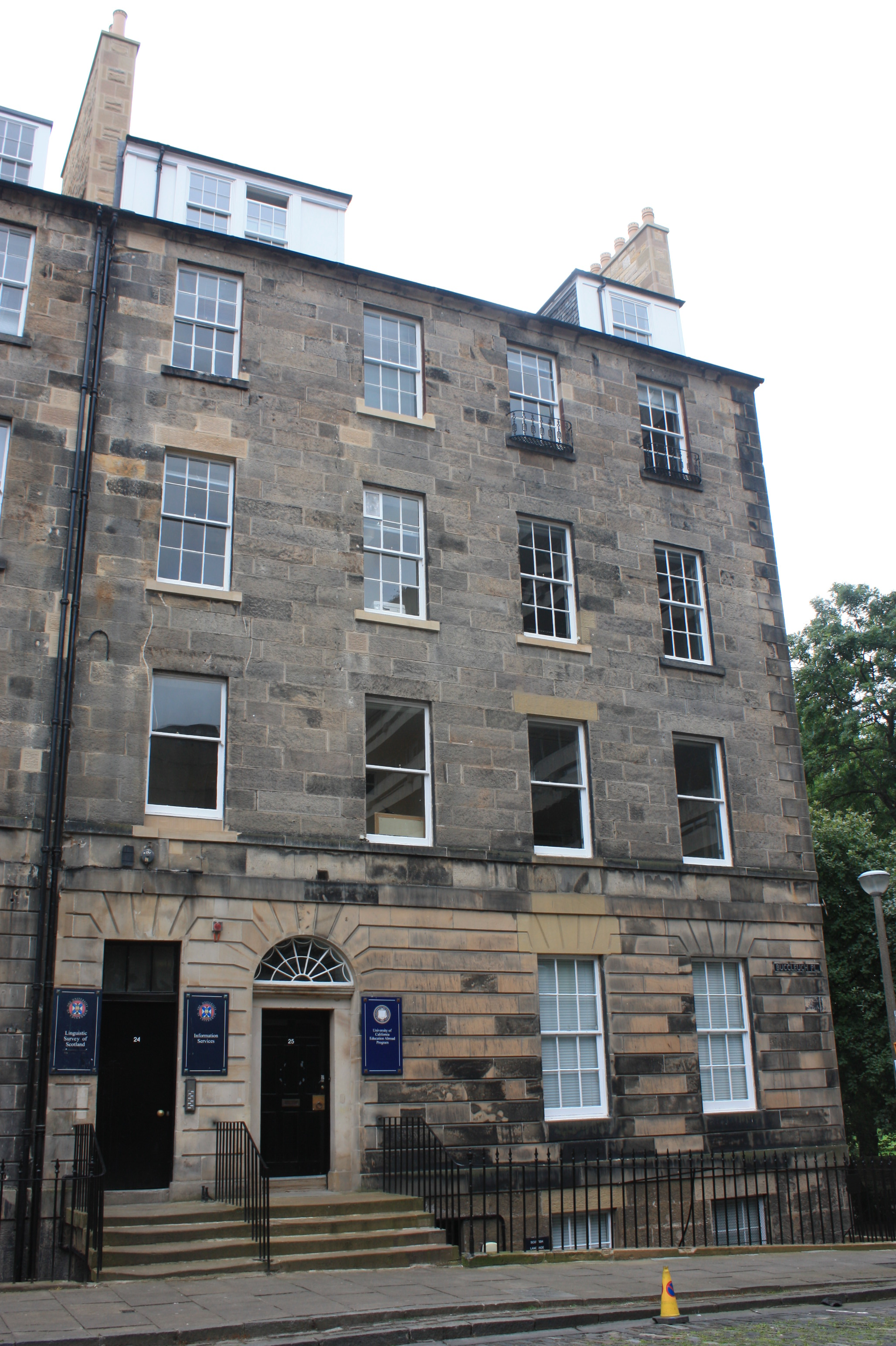
Paterson lived in a flat at 24 Buccleuch Place, Edinburgh

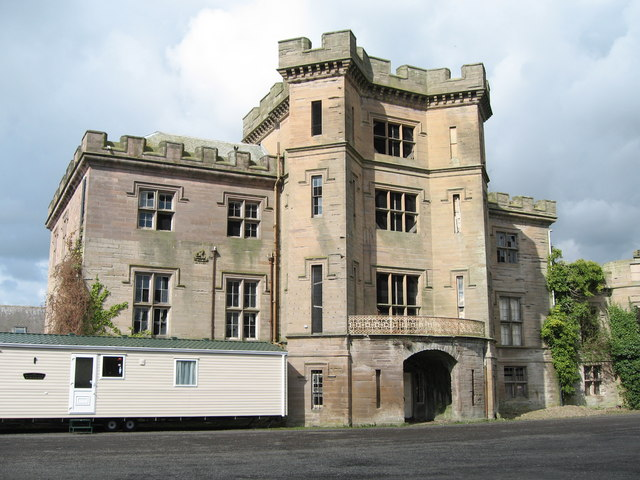
Barmoor Castle.

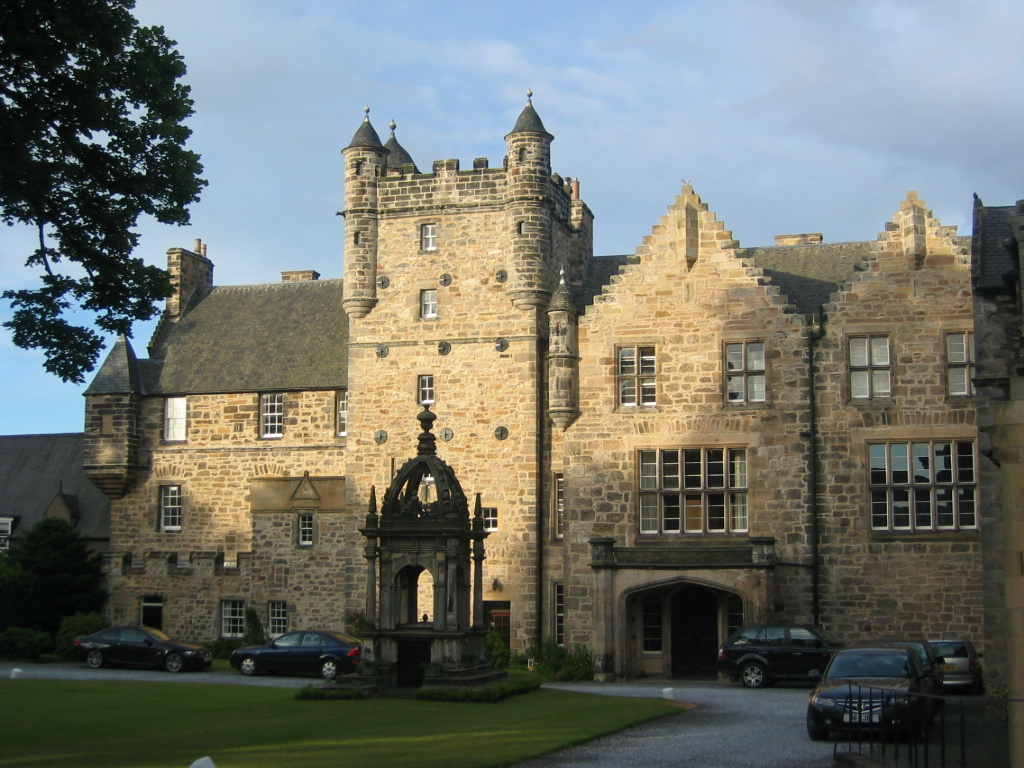
Pinkie House West Face

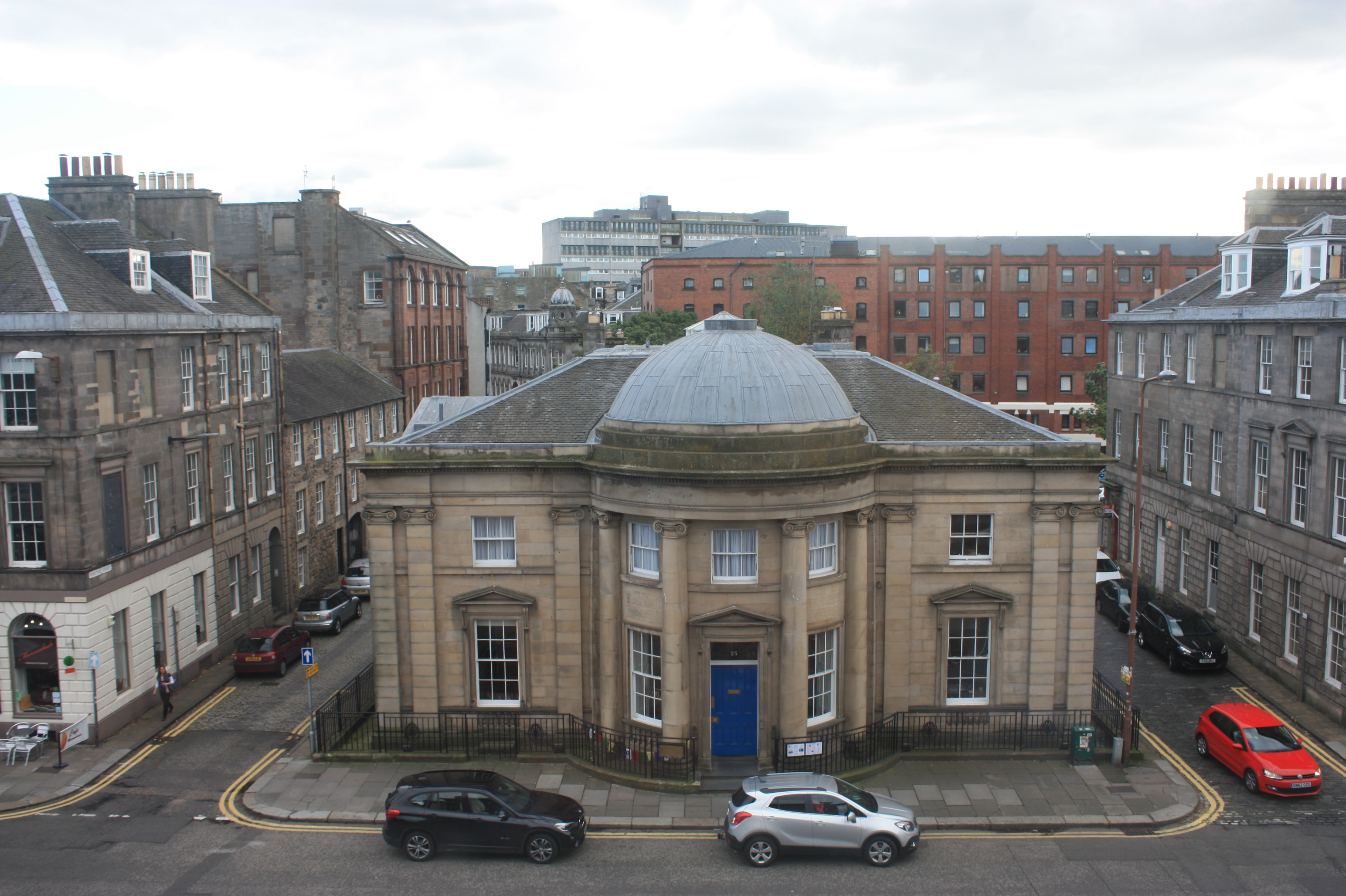
Leith Bank, Bernard Street, Edinburgh

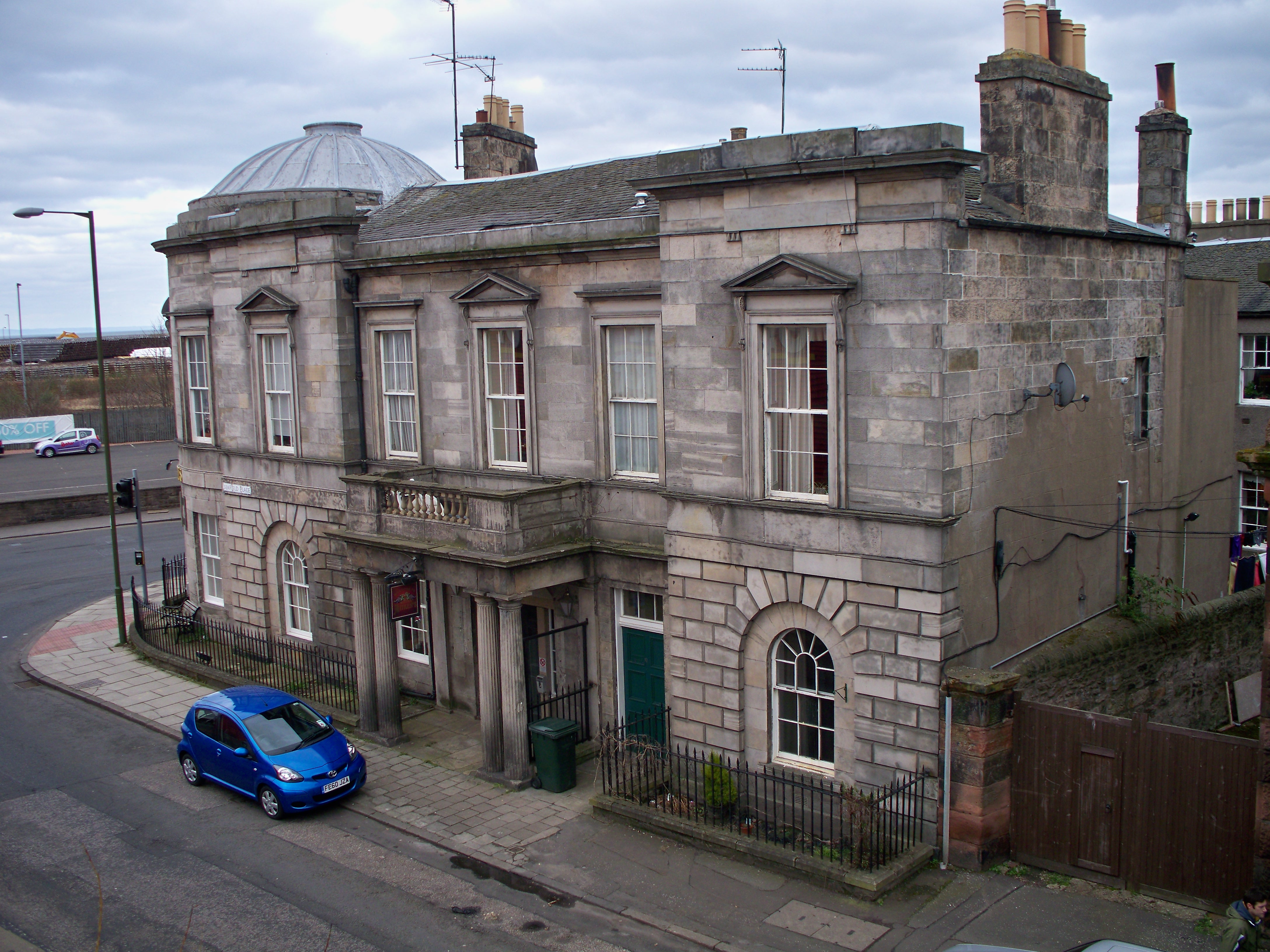
Seafield Baths, Leith. 1810. Seafield Road and Seafield Place.

John Paterson (died 1832) was a Scottish architect who trained with Robert Adam (1728–1792) whom he assisted with his work on Edinburgh University Old College and Seton House Castle.

== Life ==
He was the second son of George Paterson (d. 1789) an Edinburgh architect and builder linked to Robert Mylne and living on St John Street in the Canongate in a building he had built with Francis Charteris, Earl of Wemyss and March and thereafter shared. Its site is remembered in the building Charteris Land, a modern building which replaced it. The family also owned a small estate at Monimail in Fife called Cunnochie. The estate passed to the oldest son (also George Paterson) on the death of the father.

John lived on St John Street until 1784 and then moved to Elgin to work with Sir James Grant.

He returned to Edinburgh in 1789 to oversee the building of Old College for Robert Adam. His business connection to Adam ended in 1791, whereafter he opened an office at 2 North Bridge. In 1820 he apprenticed Anthony Salvin.

The original concept for a road on the line of what is now Waterloo Place in Edinburgh was mooted by Paterson as early as 1790.

Just before death he is listed as living at 24 Buccleuch Place in Edinburgh's south side, just south of George Square.

== Principal works ==
- Monzie Castle, 1785–1790
- Sundrum Castle, 1792.
- Dundee Royal Infirmary, 1794
- The Bridewell Prison, Duke Street, Glasgow, 1795
- Longforgan Parish Church, 1795 (incorporating older tower)
- Eglinton Castle, 1798
- Barmoor Castle, c. 1801
- Pinkie House, 1800
- St Paul's Church, Perth, 1807
- Barmoor Castle, Northumberland, 1801
- Canaan Lodge, Edinburgh (as his own home), 1802 (demolished 1988 to build the Royal Blind School)
- Harviestoun Castle near Dollar, 1804 for Crauford Tait (demolished 1971)
- Leith Bank, Bernard Street, Leith, 1804
- Magdalen Asylum, Canongate, Edinburgh, 1805 (demolished)
- Winton House, 1805
- Milbourne Hall, 1807
- Seafield Baths, Leith, 1810
- Stonehaven Sheriff Court, 1810
- Kinghorn Manse, 1816
- Brancepeth Castle County Durham, 1818-21
