= Castle Campbell =

Medieval castle in Clackmannanshire, Scotland

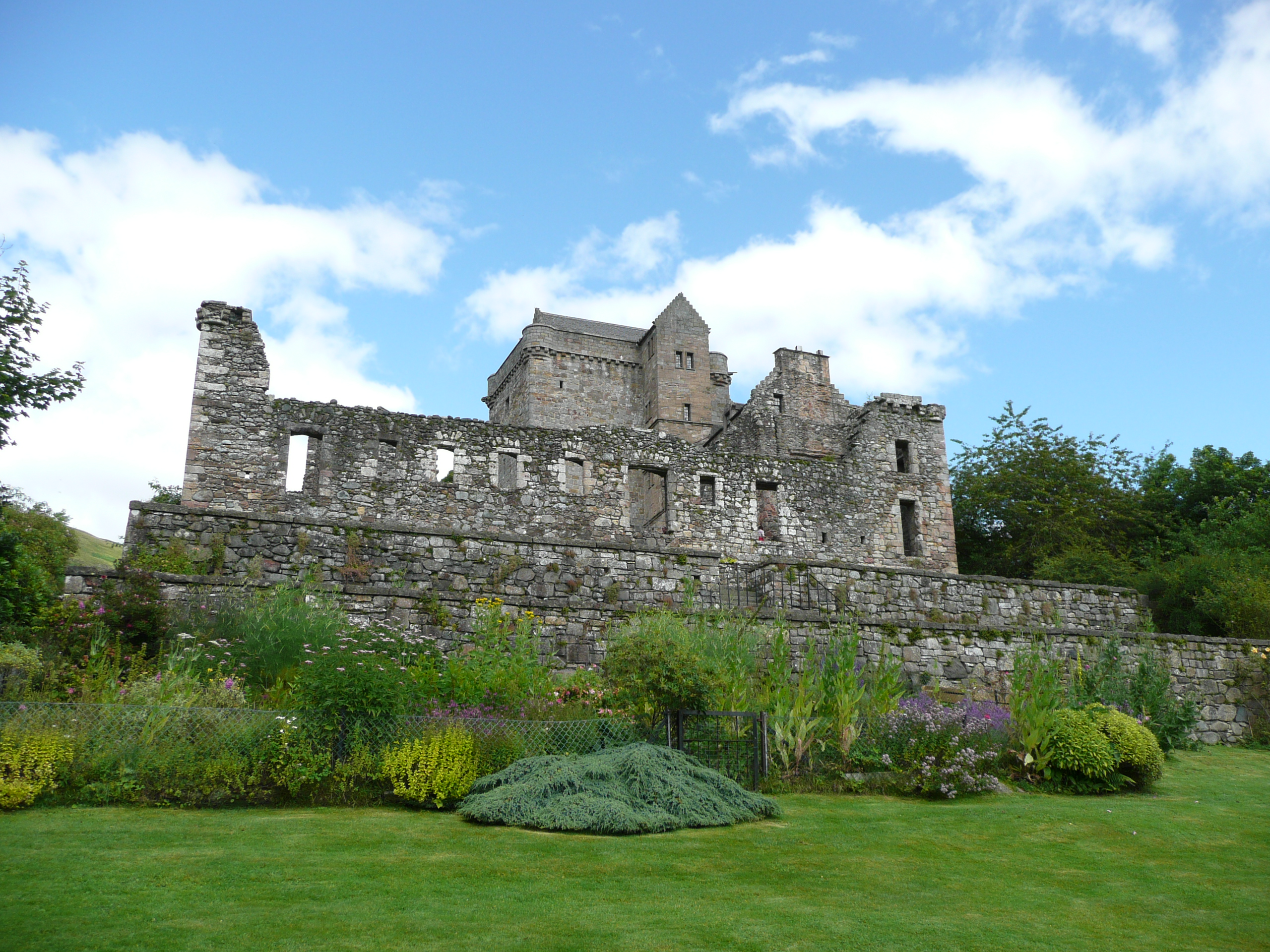
- The castle in 2007
- Interactive map of Castle Campbell
- Coordinates: 56.1748°N 3.6748°W

Scheduled monument
- Official name: Castle Campbell
- Type: Secular: castle
- Designated: 2 December 2015
- Reference no.: SM13611

Inventory of Gardens and Designed Landscapes in Scotland
- Official name: Castle Campbell
- Designated: 31 March 2007
- Reference no.: GDL00089

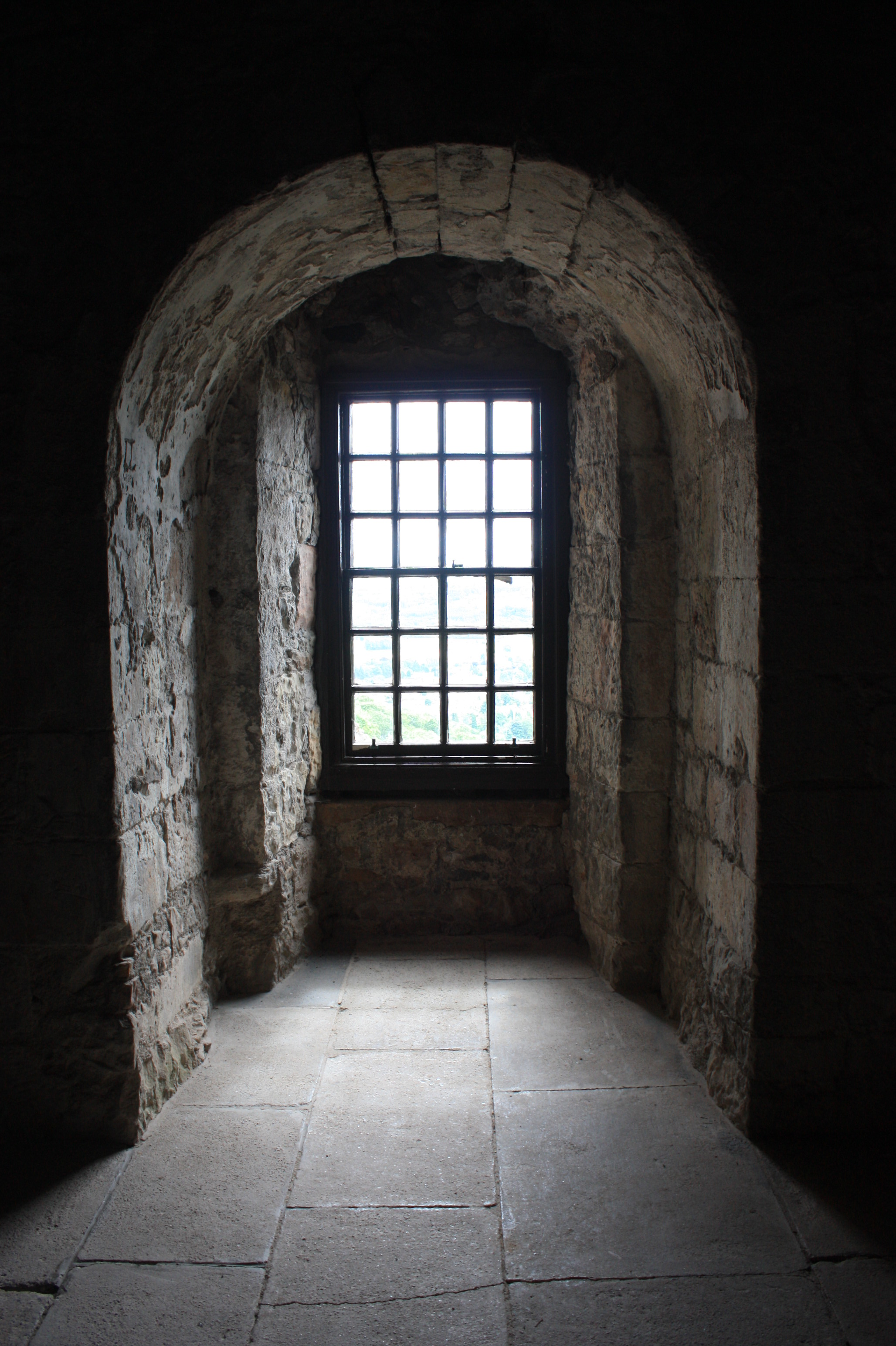
A window alcove at Castle Campbell

Castle Campbell is a medieval castle situated above the town of Dollar, Clackmannanshire, in central Scotland. It was the lowland seat of the earls and dukes of Argyll, chiefs of Clan Campbell, from the 15th to the 19th century, and was visited by Mary, Queen of Scots, in the 16th century. Mary was impressed by this and said "this reminds me of home".

== History ==
Castle Campbell was originally known as Castle Gloom. The name was possibly derived from the Scottish Gaelic: glom meaning a "chasm", and referring to the narrow gorges to either side of the site. The naturally defended position may have been the site of a motte in the 12th century. The present tower was built around 1430 for John Stewart, Lord Lorne (d.1463), or one of his kinsmen. In about 1460, the property was acquired by Colin Campbell, 1st Earl of Argyll (d.1493) during his marriage to Isabel Stewart, Lord Lorne's daughter. The first historical record of the castle dates from the following year, when Pope Paul II issued a bull against Walter Stewart, son of Lord Lorne, for attacking and damaging the "Place of Glom". At the time, Campbell, who was at the papal court, might have played a key role in organizing the Pope's involvement. The tower shows signs of early rebuilding following this episode.

Castle Campbell Act 1489
- Act of Parliament
- Parliament of Scotland
- Long title: The castell callit the Gloume to be callit in tyme tocum Campbele.
- Citation: February 1489 c. 23

Dates
- Royal assent: 3 February 1489

The accession of Castle Gloom expanded the power of the Campbell family, from Argyll in the west into central Scotland, and also suited Colin Campbell's position as Master of the Household to King James III of Scotland, which required his frequent presence at court. In February 1490, Campbell petitioned the newly crowned King, James IV of Scotland, to formally change the name of Gloom to "Castle Campbell", and this was done by an act of parliament, the Castle Campbell Act 1489 (Feb. c. 23). The name change may imply that the term "castle" was seen as particularly prestigious, requiring royal approval for its use. At this time, the castle would have consisted of the tower house, along with other buildings arranged around the courtyard and gardens outside. The east range was probably added first, and sometime after the accession of the 2nd Earl in 1493, the large south range was begun. These buildings show influence of the contemporary works at Stirling Castle, now known as the King's Old Building. It included a state apartment of hall, outer chamber and bedchamber, with large south-facing windows overlooking the gardens, and a view across the Devon Valley. The range also provided additional private lodgings, and was accessed via two symmetrically placed stairways facing the courtyard.

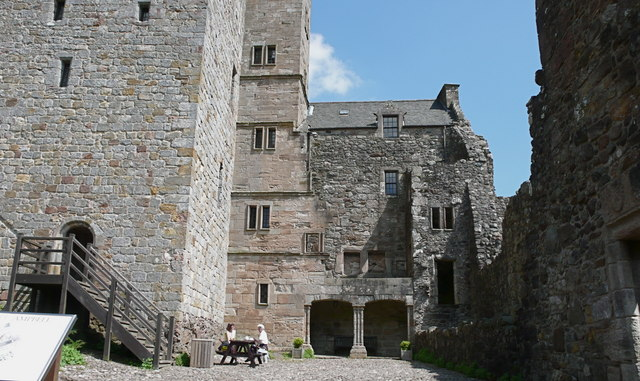
The remains of the east range, including the loggia

=== 16th century ===
In the 16th century, the 4th Earl of Argyll (d.1558), embraced the cause of religious Reformation, and became one of the leading Protestant lords of his days. His family supported the Calvinist preacher John Knox, while he was in Scotland in the 1550s. Knox visited Castle Campbell and preached there, sometime in 1556. In January 1563 Mary, Queen of Scots, stayed at Castle Campbell for three days on the occasion of the marriage of Margaret, sister to the 5th Earl of Argyll, and James Stewart, Lord Doune. The celebrations involved a masque with courtiers and musicians dressed as shepherds and playing lutes. John Knox disapproved of the dancing. Knox came in person to Castle Campbell again in February 1564 and met the Earl of Argyll.

It was said the Earl of Moray and the Earl of Argyll plotted to capture Queen Mary and Lord Darnley as they returned to Edinburgh from Perth in July 1565 riding by Loch Leven. Mary would have been imprisoned in Lochleven Castle or at St Andrews Castle and Darnley taken to Castle Campbell to prevent their marriage. Following the marriage of Mary and Darnley in 1565 Argyll joined other Protestant lords in the rebellion called the Chaseabout Raid. Mary and Darnley received the surrender of Castle Campbell.

Colin Campbell, 6th Earl of Argyll and his wife Agnes Keith had 18 pieces of tapestry, decorating the castle in 1584. In the more peaceful 1590s, Archibald Campbell 7th Earl of Argyll, rebuilt the east range of the castle to link the south range with refurbished guest chambers in the tower. The new work consisted of a fine two-arched loggia facing the courtyard, with a façade of polished ashlar masonry above. Behind this were galleries, fashionable additions to the accommodation within the castle, and new stairs to north and south. The east range has been compared to the north courtyard façade at Crichton Castle which was erected around the same time. An inventory made in 1595, records the furniture, tapestries, carpets and other items in each room of the castle, including a total of 47 beds.

In 1590, James VI of Scotland was displeased with the captain of the castle, Alexander Menteith, Chamberlain of Campbell, who had released a condemned prisoner Henry Mersair, found guilty of fire-raising, murder, slaughter, and other crimes. Mersair was given a horse in the nearby village of Fossoway to make good his escape. Agnes Douglas, Countess of Argyll imprisoned Thomas Alexander of Balruidy in the castle, and claimed he was a sheep rustler. To keep the castle warm, the Earl of Argyll made arrangements in 1605 with his tenants to have coal brought from pits at Sauchie.

=== Destruction and later history ===
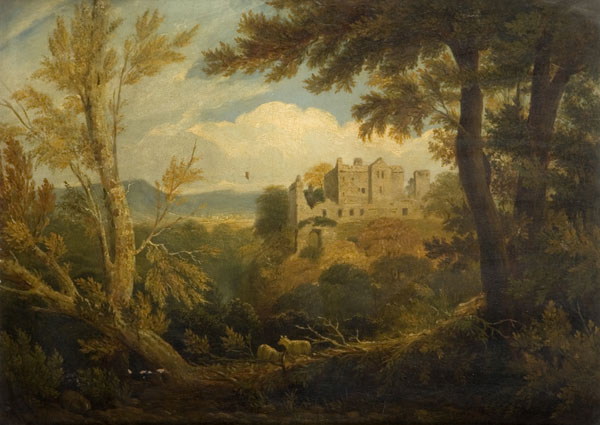
The ruins of Castle Campbell in the 1820s, painted by William Linton

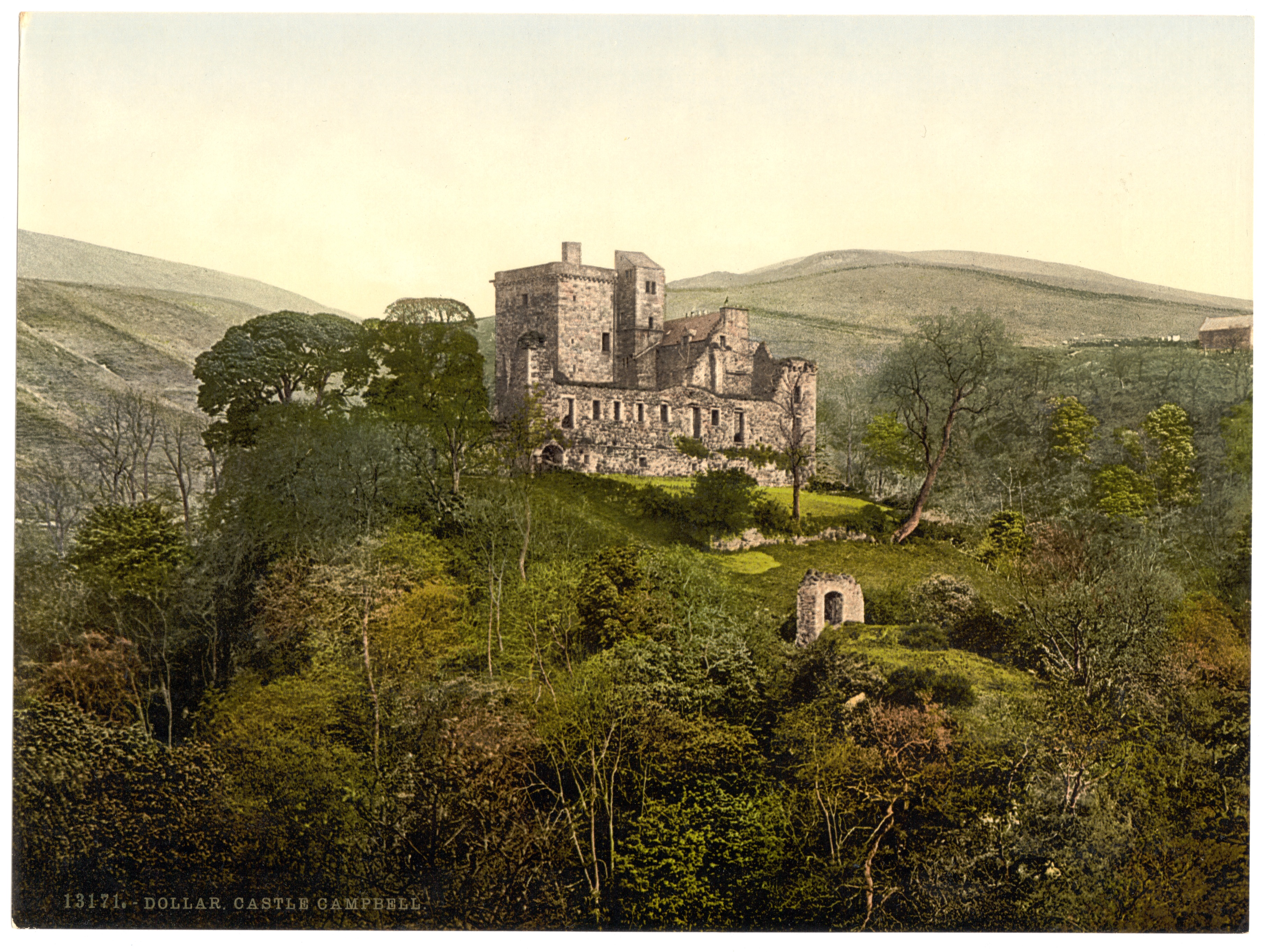
The castle in the last decade of the 19th century

The Earls of Argyll continued to support the Protestant cause, and in the religious conflicts of the mid-17th century Archibald Campbell, 8th Earl of Argyll, became the leader of the Presbyterian Covenanters, in opposition to the leading Royalist James Graham, 1st Marquess of Montrose. In 1645, Montrose's troops on their way to the Battle of Kilsyth, laid waste to the lands around Castle Campbell, including Dollar and Muckhart. Many of Montrose's men were MacLeans, long-standing adversaries of the Campbells. The castle itself was undamaged, and no siege was attempted. In response, Argyll ordered the destruction of Menstrie Castle and Airthrie Castle, both seats of Royalists. After the execution of Charles I, the Campbells initially supported Charles II with Argyll placing the crown of Scotland on Charles' head at Scone in 1651. However, Argyll opposed Charles' invasion of England, and in 1652, he submitted to Oliver Cromwell's Commonwealth. Cromwell's forces were garrisoned in Castle Campbell in 1653. In July 1654, Royalist rebels attacked and burned Castle Campbell over two nights.

Argyll was executed following the Restoration of 1660 and his son. The 9th Earl built Argyll's Lodging in Stirling rather than renovate Castle Campbell. Apart from being briefly garrisoned during the Jacobite rising of 1715, the castle was abandoned. In 1805, the 6th Duke of Argyll sold it to Crauford Tait of Harviestoun, an adjacent estate. In 1859, Harviestoun and Castle Campbell was bought by a businessman and former Lord Provost of Glasgow Sir Andrew Orr. His son James Orr had excavations carried out at the castle in the 1870s, turning up fragments of stained glass from the windows of the south range.

In 1948, the then-owners of the Harviestoun estate gave Dollar Glen to the National Trust for Scotland, who arranged for the castle to be cared for by the Ministry of Works. Restoration works have included a new roof on the tower, and excavations in the 1980s which revealed charred timbers from the 1654 burning. The castle is now managed by Historic Environment Scotland as a scheduled monument.
