= Muschamp =

Muschamp is a surname first found in Northumberland, where they held a family seat. Notable people with the surname include:

- Will Muschamp (born August 3, 1971), American football coach
- Herbert Muschamp (1947–2007), American architecture critic
- Cecil Muschamp (1902-1984), Anglican bishop
- Geoffrey de Muschamp (died 1208), medieval Bishop of Coventry
- Emerson Muschamp Bainbridge (1845-1911), English engineer, philanthropist and politician
