= Powmill =

Coordinates: 56.164534°N 3.581260°W

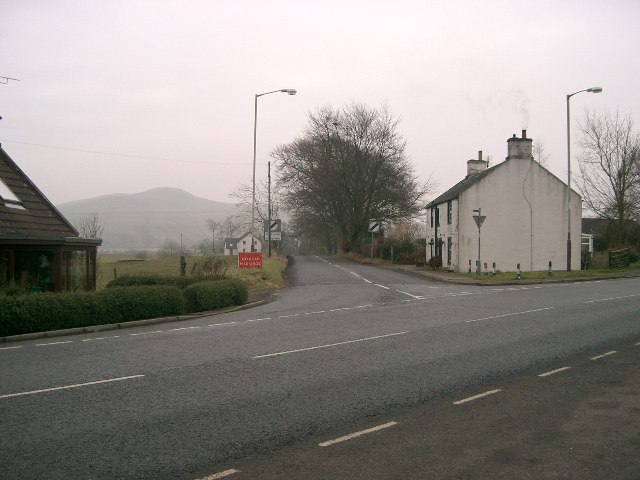
- Powmill

- Location within Perth and Kinross
- OS grid reference: NT019980
- Council area: Perth and Kinross
- Lieutenancy area: Perth and Kinross
- Country: Scotland
- Sovereign state: United Kingdom
- Post town: DOLLAR
- Postcode district: FK14
- Dialling code: 01577
- Police: Scotland
- Fire: Scottish
- Ambulance: Scottish
- UK Parliament: Perth and Kinross-shire
- Scottish Parliament: Ochil

Powmill is a village in Perth and Kinross, Scotland. It lies at the junction of the A823 and A977 roads at the southwest of the region, approximately 5 miles (8 kilometres) southwest of Kinross and 5 miles (8 kilometres) east of Dollar.

The famed Rumbling Bridge over the River Devon lies 1.14 miles (1.83 kilometres) north of Powmill.

== Amenities ==
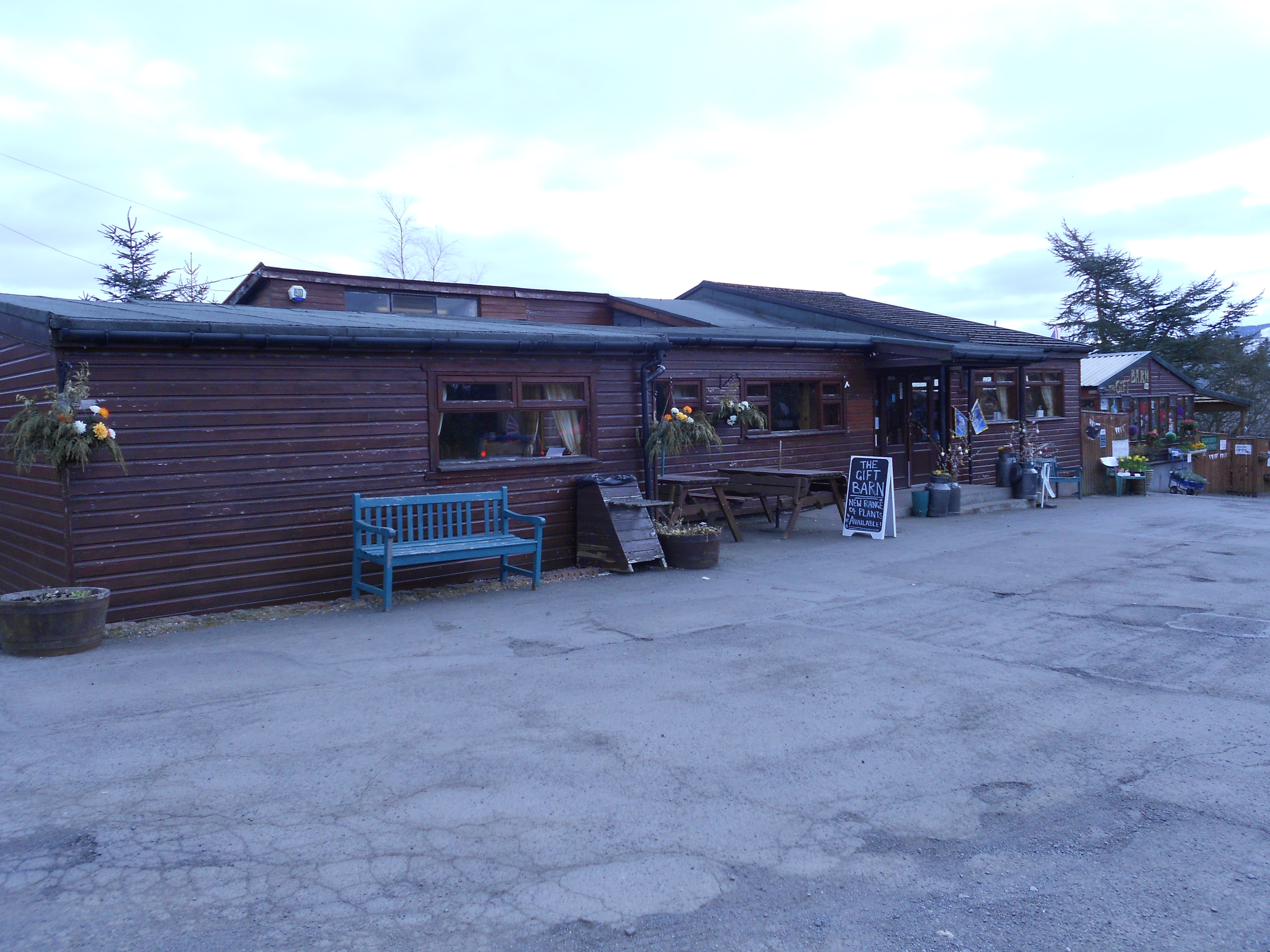
Powmill Milk Bar

The village has a small milk bar which serves hot meals and snacks. It also sells jams and other local produce. Beside the milk bar there is a small garden centre and a gift shop. The milk bar is a popular stop for tourists who are travelling to St Andrews.

It formerly also had a hotel called The Gartwhinzean which burned down in 2012.

Powmill Village Stores is a family-run business in the village; it is a convenience store that serves award-winning pies and cakes from Stuart's the Baker.
