= Dollar Glen =

Coordinates: 56.167881°N 3.668369°W

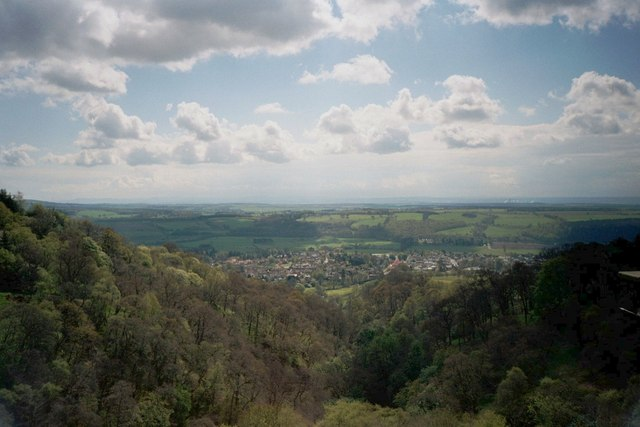
Dollar Glen

Dollar Glen is a small glen (valley) owned by the National Trust for Scotland. It is located in the Ochils that dramatically mark the Highland fault. It is near the town of Dollar, Scotland in the county of Clackmannanshire. It is popular with walkers and visitors, featuring on many routes in the area.

== Features ==
The glen has many plants, a stream and several small waterfalls.
