= Frederick Stovin =

British Army general

General Sir Frederick Stovin GCB KCMG
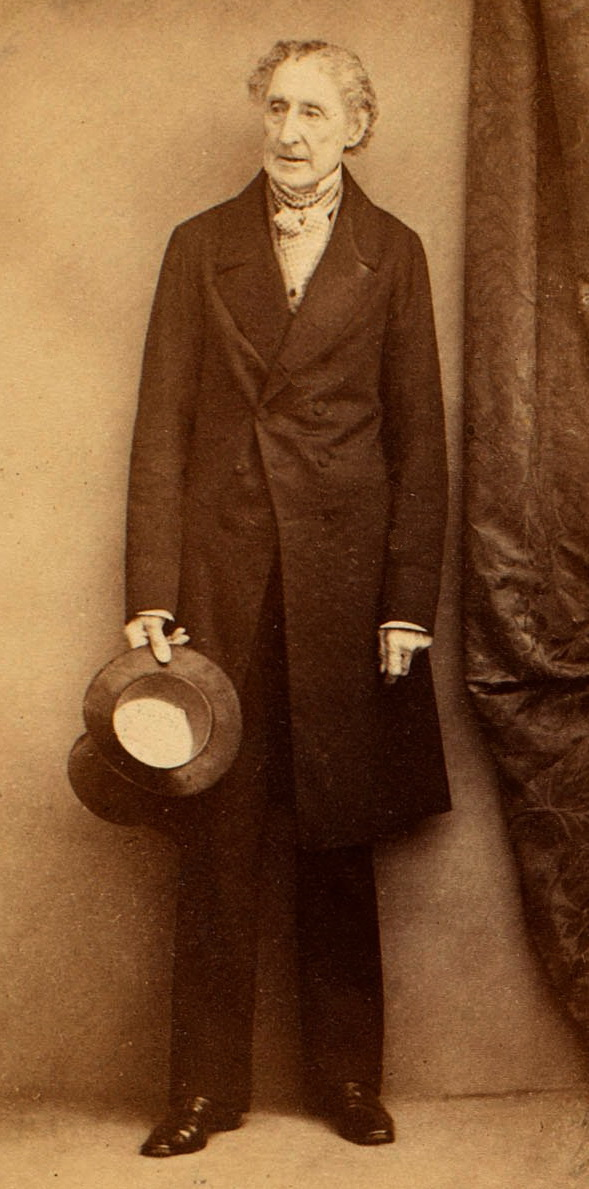
- Sir Frederick Stovin, c. 1860
- Born: 1783; Whitgift, Yorkshire
- Died: 16 August 1865 (aged 81–82); London, England
- Relatives: Lieutenant-General Richard Stovin (brother)
- Military career
- Branch: British Army
- Service years: 1800–1865
- Rank: General
- Commands: 92nd Foot (1820–1821); 90th Light Infantry (1821–1829); 83rd Foot (1848–1865)
- Awards: Knight Grand Cross of the Order of the Bath; Knight Commander of the Order of St Michael and St George; Knight Commander of the Order of the Bath; Gold Cross (two clasps)

General Sir Frederick Stovin GCB KCMG (bapt. 27 November 1783 – 16 August 1865) was a British Army officer who served throughout the Napoleonic Wars and the War of 1812. After the end of the wars, he commanded colonial garrisons and served in administrative roles in Ireland, before retiring with the rank of colonel to take up a position at court as a Groom in Waiting under Queen Victoria. In retirement, he continued to rise through the ranks of general officers by seniority, dying a full general.

He originally joined the army as an ensign in the 52nd Foot in 1800, and saw active service the same year in Spain. He later acquired a captaincy in the 28th Foot in 1803; he saw service in Germany and at the Battle of Copenhagen with the 28th, and then served on the staff under Sir John Moore until the Battle of Corunna. He was later an aide to General Alexander Mackenzie-Fraser, then to General Thomas Picton, and a divisional adjutant through the later stages of the Peninsular War. In 1814–15 he served in the War of 1812, as a staff officer with the expedition sent to New Orleans, and had he not been detained by prosecuting at a court-martial, he would have served at the Battle of Waterloo.

After the war, he commanded the 92nd Gordon Highlanders at Jamaica—where he scandalised his regiment by ordering them to adopt trousers instead of the kilt—and the 90th Light Infantry in the Ionian Islands, before retiring from active duty in 1829. He then held a number of administrative roles in Ireland, including the state secretary to the Lord-Lieutenant and the commissioner of police in Ulster, and after the accession of Queen Victoria in 1837 became a palace courtier. His final military role was the (ceremonial) colonelcy of the 83rd (County of Dublin) Regiment, which he held from 1848 until his death.

== Family and early career ==
Stovin was born at Whitgift, in the West Riding of Yorkshire (now the East Riding of Yorkshire), the son of James Stovin. He was the youngest son of a large family, by his father's second marriage; his eldest half-brother, James, later became a clergyman, a fellow of Peterhouse, Cambridge and a magistrate in Yorkshire, whilst the younger half-brother, Richard, would also join the army, rising to the rank of lieutenant-general.

Stovin joined the army at the age of seventeen, when he was commissioned as an ensign in the 52nd Foot on 22 March 1800. He served with the regiment in the expedition to Ferrol, and purchased promotion to lieutenant on 10 January 1801, he purchased a captaincy in the 62nd Foot on 20 November 1802, giving him command of a company. He was put on half-pay after the Peace of Amiens, but on 19 July 1803 took a captaincy in the 28th Foot.

Stovin served with the 28th during garrison duties in Ireland, and in the brief German expedition of 1805, before seeing service at the Battle of Copenhagen in 1807. He served under Sir John Moore in Sweden and then in Spain, in the lead-up to the Battle of Corunna. In 1809 he was the aide-de-camp to General Alexander Mackenzie-Fraser in the Walcheren expedition, then served at Gibraltar and in southern Spain with the 28th, returning to England in September 1810.

He briefly commanded the regimental depot, before returning to the peninsula in 1811 as General Thomas Picton's aide-de-camp, and later assistant adjutant-general (AAG) to Picton's 3rd Division, he received a majority by brevet on 28 April 1812, and a brevet lieutenant-colonelcy on 26 August 1813. He held the position of AAG until the end of the Peninsular War in 1814, and received the Gold Cross with two clasps for his services. When an amphibious force was sent to North America in 1814 during the War of 1812, Stovin was appointed its deputy adjutant-general; he was wounded at the Battle of New Orleans. He prosecuted the case of Lieutenant-Colonel Thomas Mullins when the force returned to the United Kingdom—Mullins, commanding the 44th Foot, had been charged with neglecting orders during the battle. As a result, although he had been assigned to Picton's staff, he missed the opportunity to serve with him in the Waterloo Campaign.

Stovin was appointed Knight Commander of the Order of the Bath on 2 January 1815 when the order was reorganised, and received the accolade and insignia of the order from the Prince Regent at Carlton House on 8 June. He married Anne Sitwell, daughter of Sir Sitwell Sitwell, 1st Baronet, on 4 October that year; the two would remain married for forty years, until Anne's death in 1856, but had no children. Unusually, Anne was a relative of his by marriage; Stovin's sister Sarah Caroline had married Sir Sitwell after his first wife's death, making Stovin's new wife his step-niece.

== Regimental command ==
He received regimental promotion to major in the 28th Foot on 9 May 1816. The regiment moved to a garrison posting in the Ionian islands in 1819, and his time in the islands saw him command a force which put down a local rising on Santa Maura. On 2 September 1819 he purchased the substantive rank of lieutenant-colonel and command of the 92nd Gordon Highlanders. His tenure at the 92nd was short and contentious; since it was garrisoned in Jamaica, he did not actually join the regiment until October 1820, and then scandalised his officers and men by his approach to regimental traditions. He appeared on parade in a cocked hat rather than the conventional highland bonnet, and attempted to order the regiment to wear trousers rather than the kilt. The Duke of York quickly arranged for his transfer to a less sensitive role, and he was transferred to command the 90th Light Infantry, a Lowland—and safely trousered—regiment, on 9 August 1821. The 90th were in the Ionian Islands, where Stovin had been posted some years earlier, but his second tour was substantially quieter; he saw no further active service before he retired from the 90th on half-pay on 23 April 1829. For his services there, he was appointed Knight Commander of the Order of St Michael and St George.

== Ireland ==
He was appointed as the military secretary to Sir John Byng, the Commander-in-Chief, Ireland, and in July 1831 became the State Secretary to the Marquess of Anglesey, the Lord Lieutenant of Ireland. He was promoted to colonel on 22 July 1830. In 1834 he became the Inspector-General of Police in Ulster, but was passed over for the position of Inspector-General of the Irish constabulary in 1836; the possibility of his appointment to the latter post had caused some concern among Irish Tories, who felt he was too critical of the Orange Order. He was later rumoured to be a candidate for the governorship of Dominica, in the West Indies, though this post does not seem to have materialised. In 1838 he was ordered to Canada to act as adjutant-general for the force garrisoned there after the Rebellions of 1837. When Lord Hill was retiring from the post of Commander-in-Chief of the Forces in 1839, Anglesey was suggested as a replacement to succeed him, although he eventually turned down the job; had he taken it up, Stovin was widely expected to become his personal secretary, the same capacity he had served in Dublin.

== Royal service ==
On the accession of Queen Victoria, he took up roles in the Royal Household, becoming a groom-in-waiting on 27 July 1837, and taking part in the coronation procession the following year. He still retained his army commission, and progressed steadily in rank through his retirement, becoming a major-general on 23 November 1841, lieutenant-general on 11 November 1851, and full general on 14 August 1859; on 1 September 1848, he took the colonelcy of the 83rd (County of Dublin) Regiment of Foot. In 1855, he accompanied the young Prince Alfred to Geneva to supervise his studies there. In 1858 he was appointed a member of the royal commission set up to look into the functioning of the militia. He resigned his role as groom in waiting on 18 November 1859, because of ill-health; he was appointed an extra groom in waiting on 28 March 1860, and promoted Knight Grand Cross of the Order of the Bath on 18 May 1860.

Stovin died on 16 August 1865, at St James's Palace, London.
