= Harviestoun =

Coordinates: 56.162°N 3.717°W

Harviestoun Castle from West c.1968

Harviestoun is an estate in Tillicoultry parish, Clackmannanshire, central Scotland. It lies at the base of the Ochil Hills, around 1.5 kilometres (0.93 mi) east of Tillicoultry and 2 kilometres (1.2 mi) west of Dollar.

== History ==
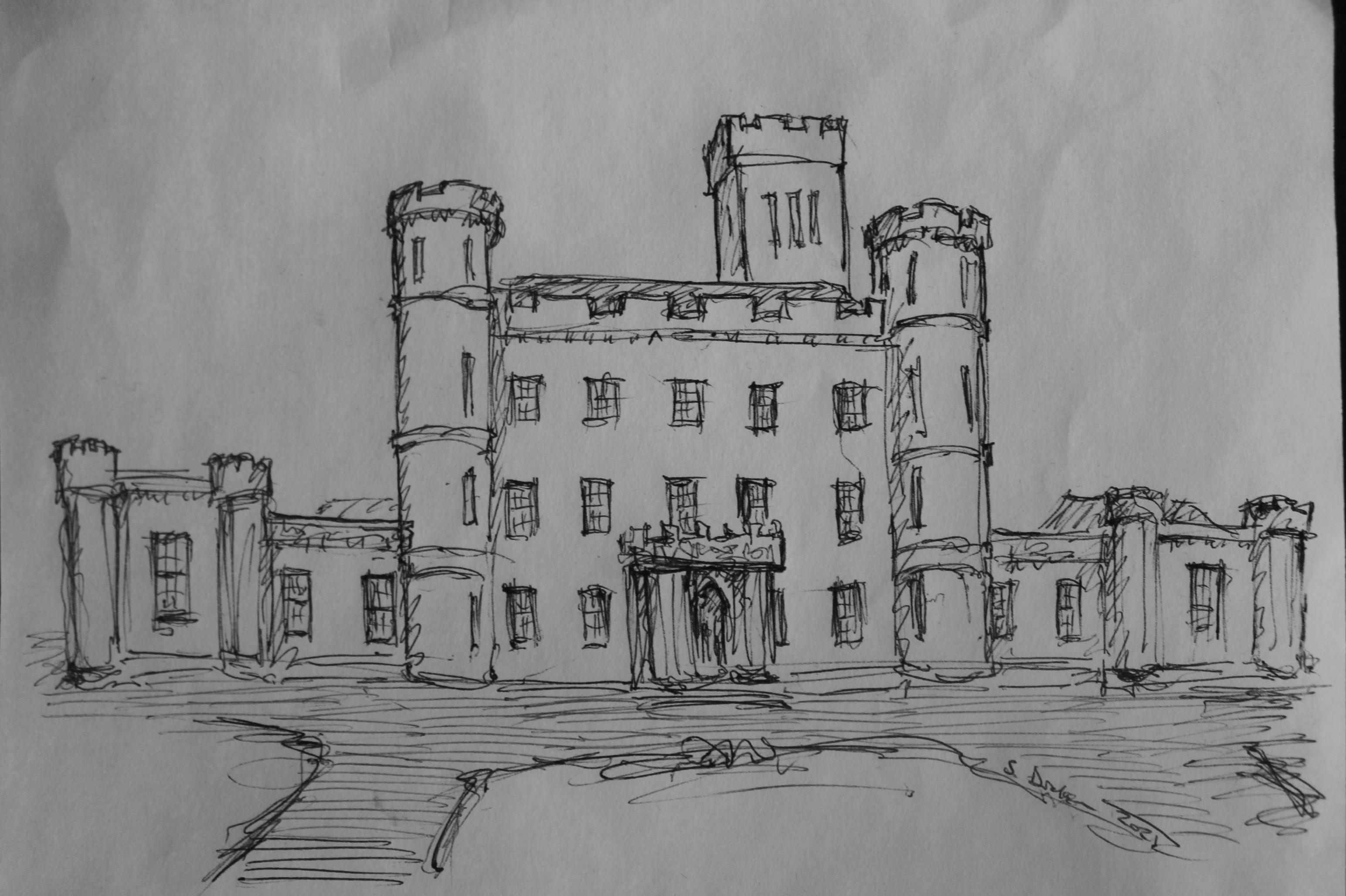
Harvieston House near Dollar

Harviestoun Home Farm, c. 1968

The Harviestoun estate was bought in around 1780 by Edinburgh lawyer John Tait. It was during a visit to Harviestoun in the summer of 1787 that Robert Burns met Charlotte Hamilton, who inspired his poem "Fairest Maid on Devon Banks". A commemorative cairn on the main road (now the A91) marks his visit. Harviestoun Castle was built in 1804 by Craufurd Tait (1765–1832) after inheriting the estate from his father in 1800. In 1805 Tait purchased Dollar Glen, including the 15th-century Castle Campbell from the Duke of Argyll. He also constructed a new home farm, coach house and walled garden. Craufurd Tait died in 1832 and was buried in the private family graveyard, now known as Tait's Tomb, located on the north bank of the River Devon midway between Dollar and Tillicoultry at a point originally with romantic views both up and downstream, until this loop of the river was diverted during construction of the Devon Valley Railway in 1869 leaving the graveyard now oddly stranded in the landscape. Craufurd's youngest son Archibald Tait (1811–1882), who was later Archbishop of Canterbury, spent much of his boyhood at Harviestoun.

Businessman and former Lord Provost of Glasgow Sir Andrew Orr (1802–1874) bought the estate in 1859. He added a new tower and porch to the castle, in pink sandstone, and formed two approaches, one leading from Tillicoultry, the other from the East Lodge, situated about one mile west of Dollar.

Kay family records show that the servants had a grand ball on ‘Christmas Night’ 1919. A cook named Mary had extra help from a family member for a month in preparation for the ball. (Agnes Kay letters 1919/1920. Source: Professor Marilyn Leask Archives)

=== 20th century ===
Harviestoun Castle from East c.1968

After fire destroyed much of the Playfair building at nearby Dollar Academy in 1961, Harviestoun Castle acted briefly as a satellite for Prep (Primary) School classes, as secondary school pupils occupied the Preparatory School building. Much of the castle was 'out of bounds' due to structural problems (possibly dry rot), but was a popular home for pupils of that era, according to accounts in school magazines. The grounds featured extensive gardens framed by two giant sequoia trees on the south lawn, and extensive plantings of rhododendron and bamboo. The castle was demolished in 1970. For a period in the 1970s a small private coal mine operated on the estate.
