= Richard Stovin =

British Army general

Lieutenant-General Richard Stovin
- Born: October 1761; Whitgift, Yorkshire
- Died: 1825 (aged 63–64)
- Spouse: Frances Acland (m. 1796)
- Children: 2
- Relatives: Frederick Stovin (brother); Wrothe Acland (brother-in-law); John Palmer-Acland MP (brother-in-law)
- Military career
- Allegiance: United Kingdom
- Branch: British Army
- Service years: 1780–1824
- Rank: Lieutenant-General
- Unit: 17th Regiment of Foot

Lieutenant-General Richard Stovin (1761–1825) was a British Army officer during the late eighteenth and early nineteenth centuries. He originally joined the army as an ensign in 1780, and saw service in the American War of Independence, where he may have been taken prisoner after the Battle of Yorktown. After the outbreak of the French Revolutionary Wars, he saw service with a force sent to invade French colonies in the Caribbean, and was taken prisoner in 1794 at Guadeloupe. Released after two years in captivity, he later commanded his regiment in the Netherlands, in the Anglo-Russian invasion of Holland of 1799, and on garrison duties in the Mediterranean and in India. In the War of 1812 he was appointed to command a division in the forces in Canada, where Stovin Island in the St. Lawrence River was named after him.

== Family and early career ==
Stovin was born at Whitgift, in the West Riding of Yorkshire (now the East Riding of Yorkshire), the son of James Stovin. His elder brother, James, later became a clergyman, a fellow of Peterhouse, Cambridge and a magistrate in Yorkshire, whilst his youngest half-brother, Frederick, would follow him into the army, rising to the rank of lieutenant general.

Stovin joined the 17th Regiment of Foot as an ensign on 16 June 1780, and served at the end of the American War of Independence. The 17th Foot was present at the Siege of Yorktown in October 1781, where it surrendered to the Americans; some 244 officers and men were taken prisoner. However, it is not clear if Stovin was among them. He was promoted to lieutenant in May 1782, but after the Treaty of Paris in 1783 he was placed on half-pay. He returned to active service by purchasing a lieutenant's commission in the 19th Regiment of Foot in January 1784, and in October 1788 was promoted to captain in the 17th.

He married Frances Acland (born 1761), the granddaughter of Sir Hugh Acland, 6th Baronet, and the sister of John Palmer-Acland, later an MP, and Wrothe Acland, later to become a lieutenant general. Wrothe Acland had joined the 17th in 1787, as an ensign, and remained with the regiment until 1793; this may have been how the two met.

Following the outbreak of the French Revolutionary Wars in 1793, he sailed with the flank companies of the 17th Foot for the West Indies. He was present at the Battle of Martinique in February and March 1794, the landings at Saint Lucia, and the Invasion of Guadeloupe in April. He was publicly thanked by Sir Charles Grey, the commander of the force, for his role in the capture of the forts at Saint Lucia. The occupying force on Guadeloupe was counter-attacked in October, by a French force led by Victor Hugues, and Stovin was placed in command of one wing of the British force, defending the camp at Berville. He was taken prisoner by the French, and held until March 1796.

== Senior command ==
On his release in 1796, he was promoted to major, and posted to a staff position in Canada. He returned to his regiment in 1798, when he took command of it in St. Domingo, and after the evacuation of the island was sent to England to raise two new battalions from volunteers in the militia. He then led them in the Anglo-Russian invasion of Holland of late 1799, where he saw action at the Battle of Krabbendam and the Battle of Bergen in September. From 1800 to 1802 he served in the Mediterranean, returning to England after the Peace of Amiens.

The 17th Foot was stationed in India from 1804, and Stovin commanded them at the siege of Chumar in 1807. He was given a brevet colonelcy in 1808, and later posted to command a brigade in India.

On 4 June 1811, Stovin was promoted to major general, and was sent to Canada in 1813 during the War of 1812. He commanded the Centre Division from February to July 1814, and the Right Division from October to December. Stovin Island, in the St. Lawrence River, was named for him after the war, one of a number of military commanders commemorated in the "Thousand Islands".

Stovin was promoted to lieutenant general in 1821, retired from service in 1824 and died in 1825.
