= Rumbling Bridge =

Village in Perth and Kinross, Scotland

Coordinates: 56°10′39″N 3°35′07″W

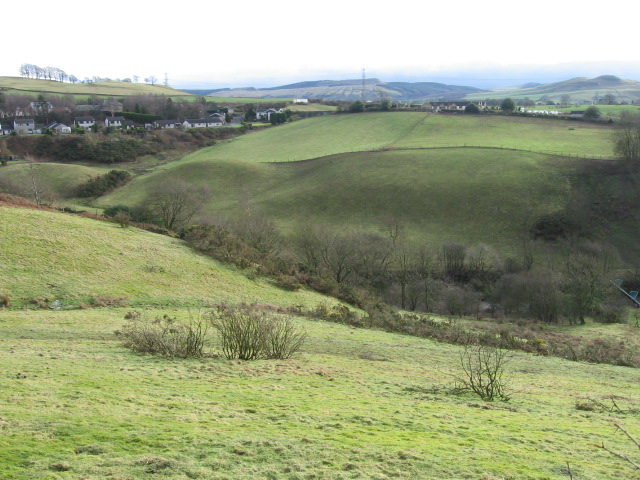
The River Devon valley near the village of Rumbling Bridge

Rumbling Bridge (Scottish Gaelic: An Drochaid Rùchdail, Scots: Rummlin Brig) is a small village built on both sides of a gorge of the River Devon, which formed the boundary between the historic counties of Perthshire and Kinross-shire and is now within the combined Perth and Kinross council area, Scotland, where the A823 leaves the A977. It lies roughly one mile (1.5 kilometres) equidistant from Muckhart to its north, Crook of Devon to its east and Powmill to its south.

== The bridge ==
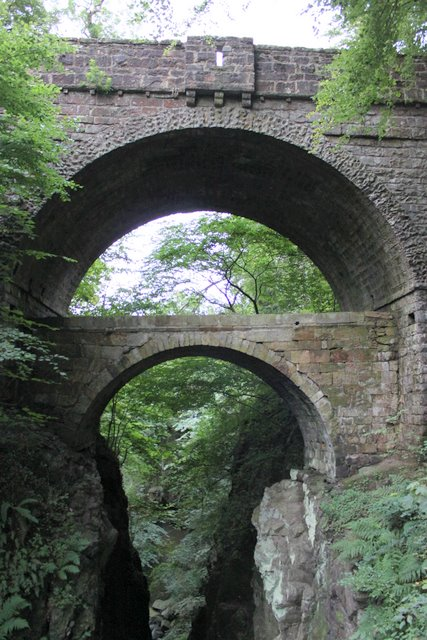
Rumbling Bridge, the double bridge which gives its name to the village

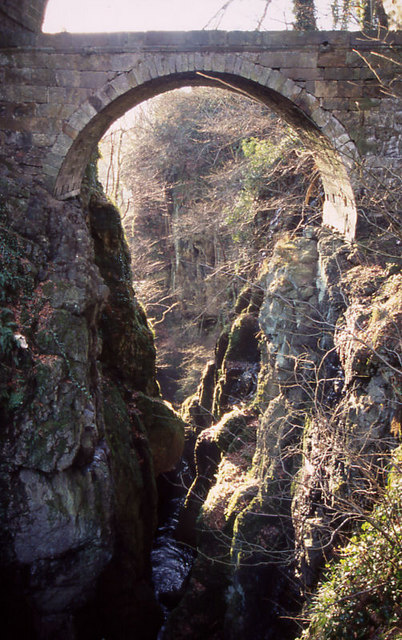
The lower bridge, above the deep narrow gorge which causes the rumble

The "lower" bridge, without parapets, was built in 1713 by William Gray, a mason from Saline. It is 22 feet (6.7 metres) long, 11 ft (3.4 m) wide, and 86 ft (26 m) above the average water level.

The second bridge or Upper Arch (120 feet or 37 metres above the river) was constructed 34 feet (10 metres) above it in 1816 and gave it an easier gradient by removing the steep slope down to the old bridge. On 18 March that year there was "the greatest flood ever heard of or seen in Kinross; all the burns were brimfull". On 13 August, "a smart shock of earthquake was felt throughout Kinross at 11 o'clock at night. Plates rattled on shelves; chairs moved about and were thrown over; beds shook, &c." There was also a "wet and late harvest" during which there was snow on four occasions from five to six inches (130 to 150 mm) deep.

== Deaths ==
In May 1849, a young boy James Anderson was killed after falling one hundred feet (30 m) from the high rocks to the west of the Rumbling Bridge while birdnesting. On 6 August 2002, after heavy rains and flash flooding, 16-year Alix-Ann Aisin MacKay fell into the gorge and died trying to cross it with friends.

== Notable residents ==
Grace Cadell (1855–1918), Scotland's first female surgeon and an active leader of the suffragettes lived her final years at Mosspark, Rumbling Bridge, and died there in 1918.
