= Mount Pleasant, Sheffield =

Mansion in Sheffield, England

Coordinates: 53.3671°N 1.4772°W

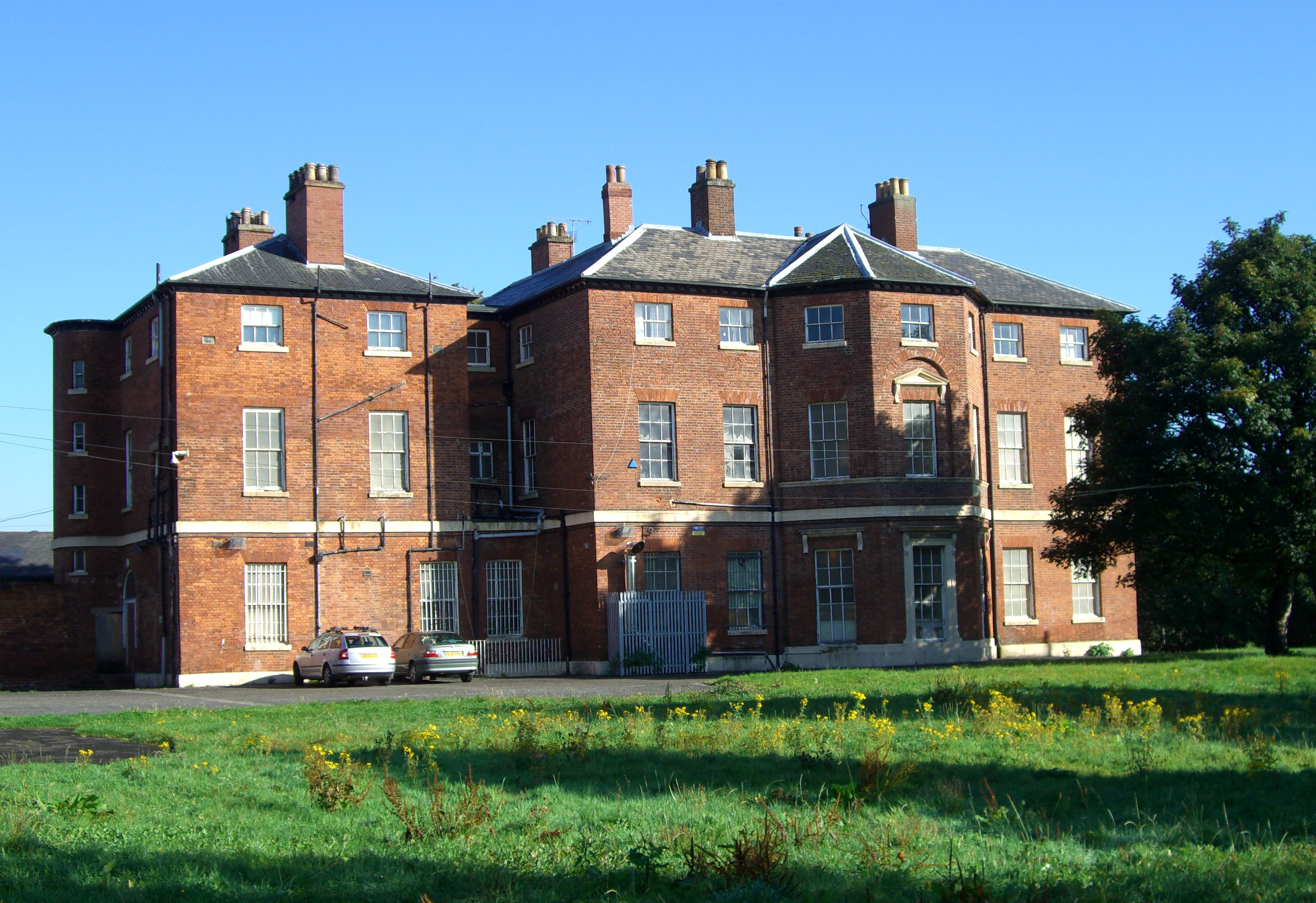
The south side of the house.

Mount Pleasant is an 18th-century mansion situated on Sharrow Lane in the Highfield area of the City of Sheffield in South Yorkshire, England. The house stands just under two km south of the city centre and is a grade II* listed building, it has been described as "one of the best 18th century houses in Sheffield". The adjacent former stables and coach house are also Grade II* listed.

== History ==
Mount Pleasant was built by Francis Hurt Sitwell. The Sitwells were an eminent family of Derbyshire landowners who owned a large ironworks at Eckington. The house was constructed in 1777 using the architect John Platt (1728–1810) of Rotherham, who was also involved in masonry work at Clifton Hall and Wentworth Castle during his career. When first built the mansion stood in a rural situation within sight of the centre of Sheffield, surrounded by farmland at the top of a slight gradient overlooking the valley of the River Sheaf. The Sitwells owned Mount Pleasant for less than 20 years as in 1794 it was sold to Samuel Broomhead Ward who was to become Master Cutler in 1798. By the 1850s the family of Thomas Tillotson, a Sheffield merchant were living at Mount Pleasant, after that the building was utilised for various purposes. In 1868 the committee of the West Riding County Asylum at Wakefield acquired a five-year lease on Mount Pleasant and used it to alleviate overcrowding at their main hospital. As an asylum, Mount Pleasant accommodated approximately 75 residents with eight staff, in 1872 all residents were transferred to the newly built South Yorkshire Asylum at Wadsley. In 1874 Mount Pleasant became the Girls’ Charity School when it was relocated from its original location in St James Row at the side of Sheffield Cathedral. In 1927 the school was renamed the Mount Pleasant School for Girls.

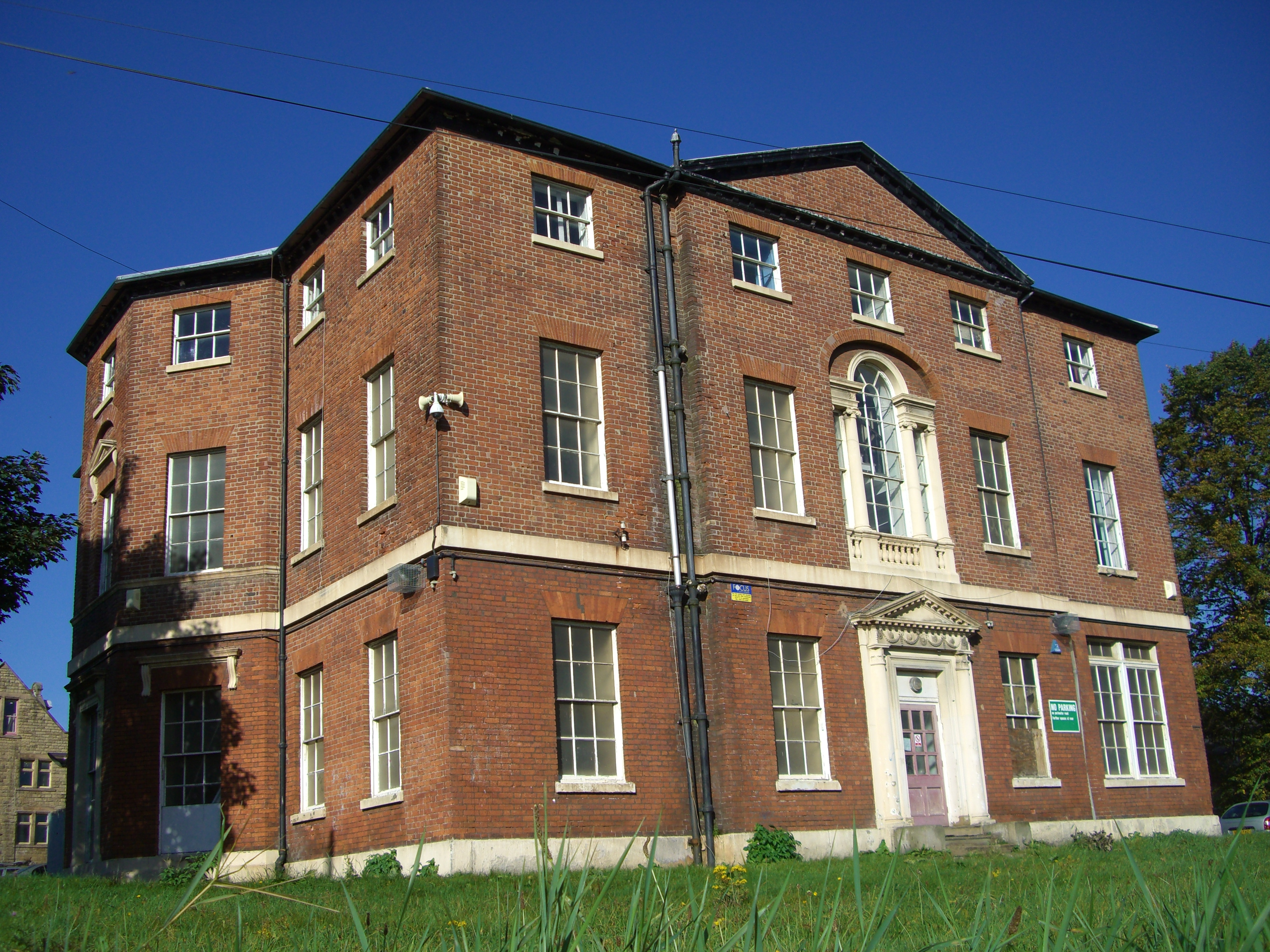
The more decorative eastern side of the house.

Mount Pleasant was requisitioned for use by the Government during World War II and after the War the building continued to be used by various Government departments with the Ministry of Works Engineering Department, the Ministry of Fuel and the Ministry of Transport all having office space there. Mount Pleasant was designated a listed building in May 1952. By 1961 there was just the National Assistance Board and the Drivers Examiners Department using the buildings with the latter using the old stables and coach house buildings as offices. When the building was vacated by the government it fell into a state of near ruin during the late 1960s and early 1970s but was restored in the mid-1970s and converted into a Community centre with the stables used as a Youth club known as The Stables Connexions Centre. The main building fell out of use for over a decade, but in 2024 work started to convert it into a care home which is due to open in early 2026.

== Architecture ==
Mount Pleasant is brick built with stone dressings and a hipped slate roof. It has three stories with a full-height canted bay window on the south side. Most of the windows are of the sash design. The most decorative side of the house is the shorter east elevation which has its middle three bays brought forward and given a pediment. There is a palladian window on the first floor set in an arch with a balustrade below. The ornamental doorway has Corinthian columns and a pediment. The former stables and coach house are of similar build to the main house being constructed of red brick with stone dressings incorporating sash windows.
