= Sitwell =

Sitwell is a surname. Notable people with the surname include:

- A member of the Sitwell literary family:

- Edith Sitwell
- Osbert Sitwell
- Sacheverell Sitwell

- The Sitwell Baronets, holders of a hereditary baronetcy awarded by the British Crown

- Sir Sitwell Sitwell, 1st Baronet
- Sir George Sitwell, 2nd Baronet
- Sir Sitwell Reresby Sitwell, 3rd Baronet
- Sir George Reresby Sitwell, 4th Baronet
- Sir (Francis) Osbert Sitwell, 5th Baronet
- Sir Sacheverell Sitwell, 6th Baronet
- Sir Sacheverell Reresby Sitwell, 7th Baronet
- Sir George Reresby Sitwell, 8th Baronet

== Fictional characters ==
- Jasper Sitwell, a comic book espionage agent in the Marvel Comics universe
- Stan Sitwell, a character from the Fox television comedy series Arrested Development
