= Reresby Sitwell =

English landowner

Sir Reresby Sitwell Bt DL

High Sheriff of Derbyshire
- In office 1983–1983
- Preceded by: Godfrey Meynell
- Succeeded by: Charles Stephenson

Personal details
- Born: Sacheverell Reresby Sitwell; 15 April 1927
- Died: 31 March 2009 (aged 81)
- Spouse: Penelope Forbes (m. 1952; died 2009)
- Children: Alexandra Hayward
- Parent(s): Sir Sacheverell Sitwell, 6th Baronet; Georgia Louise Doble
- Relatives: Edith Sitwell (aunt); Osbert Sitwell (uncle); George Sitwell (nephew); William Sitwell (nephew)
- Education: Sandroyd School; Eton College; King's College, Cambridge

Sir Sacheverell Reresby Sitwell, 7th Baronet DL (15 April 1927 – 31 March 2009) was the head of the Sitwell family, and owner of Renishaw Hall, Derbyshire.

== Early life ==
Sacheverell was born on 15 April 1927 to Sir Sacheverell Sitwell, 6th Baronet, and his wife Georgia Louise, née Doble. His only sibling was Francis Trajan Sacheverell Sitwell, member of the Council of the London Philharmonic Orchestra, who lived at Weston Hall, Northamptonshire.

His paternal grandparents were Sir George Sitwell, 4th Baronet, of Renishaw Hall, and the former Lady Ida Emily Augusta Denison (a daughter of the 1st Earl of Londesborough and a granddaughter of the 7th Duke of Beaufort). He was the nephew of poet and critic Dame Edith Sitwell and Sir Osbert Sitwell, 5th Baronet. His maternal grandparents were Georgie (née Hyde) Doble and Arthur Richard Doble, a wealthy Canadian banker. His maternal aunt was Frances Doble, an actress who had a short career on the West End stage in the 1920s and 1930s before her marriage to Sir Anthony Lindsay-Hogg, 2nd Baronet.

He was educated at Sandroyd School then Eton College and King's College, Cambridge, but left the latter of his own volition without a degree.

== Career ==
Between 1946 and 1948, he was a Lieutenant in the Grenadier Guards after which he worked in advertising and as a public relations executive from 1948 and 1960. From 1960 to 1970, he owned a vending machine business as well as a wine business with Bruce Shand between 1960 and 1975.

During his lifetime, Sitwell wrote a new variation upon the Robin Hood tale, wrote the book Hortus Sitwellianus, and co-authored the book Mount Athos, with John Cooper, 2nd Viscount Norwich. He was known for his support of the arts and the upkeep of Renishaw Hall.

He served as High Sheriff of Derbyshire in 1983, and was Deputy Lieutenant of Derbyshire in 1984. Upon the death of his father in 1988, he succeeded as the 7th Baronet Sitwell, of Renishaw, Count of Derby.

== Personal life ==
On 31 October 1952, Sitwell was married to Penelope Forbes (b. 1923), the daughter of Colonel Hon. Donald Alexander Forbes (brother of the 8th Earl of Granard) and Mary Doreen Lawson (a daughter of Andrew Sherlock Lawson and granddaughter of the 14th Viscount Mountgarret). Together, they were the parents of:

- Alexandra Isobel Susanna Edith Sitwell (b. 1958), who married Richard "Rick" Hayward, son of Sir Jack Hayward and Jean Mary Forder, in 1991.

Sitwell died on 31 March 2009. He was succeeded in the baronetcy by his nephew, George Sitwell, the son of his brother Francis, who died in 2004, and his sister-in-law Susanna Cross. Due to Sir Reresby and his brother being "never in harmony", he bequeathed Renishaw Hall to his daughter, and only child, Alexandra.

Baronetage of the United Kingdom
Preceded by Sacheverell Sitwell	Baronet (of Renishaw); 1988–2009	Succeeded by George Sitwell
