= Left Hand, Right Hand! =

Autobiography by Osbert Sitwell

Left Hand, Right Hand! is an autobiography in five volumes by the English poet and man of letters Osbert Sitwell. It relates in opulent detail the story of the author's early life in relation to his ancestors, his immediate family, especially his father Sir George Sitwell, and the fashionable and artistic world of his time. The five volumes are: Left Hand, Right Hand! (1944), re-titled in some editions The Cruel Month, about his ancestry and early childhood; The Scarlet Tree (1945), about his education at Eton and his first experiences of Italy; Great Morning (1947), about his boyhood and his peacetime service as an army officer; Laughter in the Next Room (1948), about his career after the First World War as a writer; and Noble Essences (1950), about his many notable friends. A sixth volume, Tales My Father Taught Me (1962), which was not formally included in the sequence, relates a number of further anecdotes about Sir George. Left Hand, Right Hand! has been acclaimed by both critics and readers from its first publication up to the present century, and is widely recognized as Sitwell's greatest work.

== Themes, characters and locales ==
Left Hand, Right Hand! details, with a circumstantial nostalgia comparable to that of Marcel Proust, not just his own early history but the history of his family and of the vanished fashionable world it inhabited. He intended it to be, as he wrote in the introduction to the first volume, "full of detail, massed or individual, to be gothic, complicated in surface and crowned with turrets and with pinnacles".

Sitwell's autobiography is not entirely candid either about himself – he never, for example, mentions his homosexuality – or about his family, but he tells much about its internal tensions, that claustrophobic atmosphere which caused D. H. Lawrence to write about the Sitwells that "I never in my life saw such a strong, strange family complex: as if they were marooned on a desert island, and nobody in the world but their own lost selves." The figure of Sitwell's father, Sir George, looms large in the autobiography, as he did in Sitwell's life. Overbearing, egotistical and insensitive, he dominated his children, and Osbert in particular, through his demands on them and his control of the family finances, and gave inadvertent pain to them all, while also providing Osbert with a figure of legend rich in character and black humour which he could exploit in his autobiography. He is described there as "one of the most singular characters of his epoch". At the time Sitwell began Left Hand, Right Hand! he was, and had all his life been, bitterly resentful of his father's dominant role in his life, but the autobiography shows little sign of this, presenting Sir George rather as a comical eccentric, perhaps in an attempt to make his peace with his father's memory, perhaps as a final act of revenge, or perhaps with increasing affection as he slowly realized that his father had intended none of the pain he had caused. Counterbalancing Sir George in the autobiography is his rambunctious Yorkshire valet, Henry Moat, whom the poet G. S. Fraser described as a Sancho Panza to his Don Quixote, and whose close but stormy relationship with his exasperating and endearing employer lasted, on and off, for more than forty years. Writing about his mother, Lady Ida, Sitwell had to be circumspect, his sister Edith having previously been troubled by their brother Sacheverell's portrayal of her in his Splendours and Miseries. The setting of Left Hand, Right Hand! largely moves between Renishaw, the country seat of the Sitwell family, Scarborough, where he spent much of his childhood, and the Castello di Montegufoni, a huge medieval castle in Tuscany purchased by Sir George.

== Composition and publication ==
Sitwell was working on the first volume, originally to have been called The Cruel Month, by May 1941, and completed it in the spring of 1942. Eventually he decided on the title Left Hand, Right Hand!, reflecting the chiromantic principle that the left hand reveals those traits of character that are inborn and the right hand those that stem from one's own will. It was serialized in The Atlantic Monthly from January 1944, and first published in book form in May 1944 by the Boston firm of Little, Brown. It was first published in the United Kingdom by Macmillan in March 1945, and for this edition Sitwell reverted to his original idea of calling it The Cruel Month, reserving Left Hand, Right Hand! as the title of the autobiographical series as a whole. Further volumes appeared at regular intervals. The second, The Scarlet Tree, was completed by April 1944 and published the following year; the third was Great Morning (1947); the fourth, Laughter in the Next Room, completed by September 1947, was published in 1948; and the final volume, Noble Essences, appeared in September 1950. In the autumn of 1956 Sitwell began to dictate one further memoir, a collection of 28 disconnected anecdotes about Sir George called Tales My Father Taught Me, which was finally published in 1962. Though none of them had previously appeared in book-form, some had been printed in such magazines as Vogue and The Atlantic Monthly. Sitwell did not present this book as being part of Left Hand, Right Hand!, but it is now sometimes seen as being its sixth volume. In 1984, after Sitwell's death, Patrick Taylor-Martin edited and Penguin Books published a one-volume abridgement of Left Hand, Right Hand! less than half the length of the original.

== Reception ==
The publication of the first volume of Left Hand, Right Hand! was met by a storm of applause from both the reading public and the critics. A generation weary of wartime austerity relished the sumptuousness of Sitwell's prose, and the breadth and particularity of his evocation of a time that was still within living memory, yet forever lost. E. M. Forster, in a BBC broadcast, acclaimed the first volume for its "freshness and width...a sort of social lavishness", and called it "an admirable book". L. P. Hartley called it "a work of tremendous complexity and subtlety", and when The Scarlet Tree appeared he greeted it as the first volume's equal. The Sunday Times thought Sitwell should be rewarded for The Scarlet Tree with a thousand pounds and a medal. There was likewise much praise for Great Morning, with George Orwell, for example, commending Sitwell's honesty and moral courage in not pretending that he had held at the beginning of the 20th century the progressive opinions common in the 1940s; he thought the three volumes published up to that point "must be among the best autobiographies of our time". (Note: On the front- and back-covers of Taylor-Martin's abridgement Penguin Books improves this Orwell quotation to "the best autobiography of our time".) There were some dissenting voices, one of which, in the New Statesman, moved him to write a letter of protest to the editor, who persuaded him that it would be against his interests for the magazine to publish it. The appearance of Laughter in the Next Room induced The Times Literary Supplement to predict that when completed the work would be one of "the essential autobiographies of the language", and the final volume, Noble Essences, was published to almost uniform critical praise. Tales My Father Taught Me was welcomed by those who had enjoyed Left Hand, Right Hand!, though one or two complained about Sitwell's elaborate prose, which sometimes read, said Michael Holroyd in The Spectator, "like that of Sir Thomas Browne after being translated by Proust into French and subsequently rendered back into English by Henry James."

Left Hand, Right Hand! is now considered to be Osbert Sitwell's finest work, the work on which his reputation in the 21st century rests. A. N. Wilson, who denied all of the Sitwells any claim to genius, nevertheless acknowledged that Osbert was "a supremely gifted writer of autobiography". G. S. Fraser thought that in Sir George "he had to his hand, or from the facts of memory created, one of the great comic characters in English fiction". Martin Seymour-Smith took a similar position to George Orwell in stating that it was his best work because "it does not take up a defensive position...but simply records". For John Lehmann it was "one of the most extraordinary and original works of our time", and for G. A. Cevasco, "among the best autobiographies ever written".
