= Reresby =

English name

Reresby (pronounced /rirˈɛsbi/ REARS-bee) is a rare English name of probable Old Norse etymology, from raer, meaning a bank or riverbank, and by, meaning a settlement or farm. Notable people with the name include:

== As a surname ==
- Sir John Reresby, 1st Baronet (1611–1646)
- Sir John Reresby, 2nd Baronet (1634–1689), English politician and diarist, eldest son of the 1st Baronet
- Sir William Reresby, 3rd Baronet (1669–c. 1735), eldest son of the 2nd Baronet
- Sir Leonard Reresby, 4th Baronet (1679–1748), youngest son of the 2nd Baronet

== As a given or middle name ==
- Sir Sitwell Reresby Sitwell, 3rd Baronet (1820–1862), English officer of the 1st Life Guards
- Sir George Reresby Sitwell, 4th Baronet (1860–1943), English antiquarian writer and politician, son of the 3rd Baronet
- Sir Sacheverell Reresby Sitwell, 6th Baronet (1897–1988), English writer and art and music critic, younger son of the 4th Baronet
- Sir Sacheverell Reresby Sitwell, 7th Baronet (1927–2009), English landowner and art patron, elder son of the 6th Baronet
- Sir George Reresby Sacheverell Sitwell, 8th Baronet (born 1967), English businessman, nephew of the 7th Baronet

== Fictional characters ==
- Sir Michael Reresby, a minor character from the sixth series of the British historical drama television series Downton Abbey, portrayed by Ronald Pickup
