= Façade discography =

Collection of poems and instrumental arrangements

Façade – an entertainment comprising poems by Edith Sitwell read to instrumental accompaniments composed by William Walton – was first recorded, by its creators, in 1929. Over the next two decades Sitwell and Walton added numbers to the entertainment and removed others. A definitive edition was published in 1951. In 1977, after Sitwell's death, Walton released a set of eight poems and accompaniments not included in the 1951 score, titling it Façade Revived. After further revision the second work was published as Façade 2 in 1979. Most recorded sets of Façade made since then have included the 1970s additions, and some have also included a selection of Sitwell's poems for which no music is known to exist.

Reciters	Players	Conductor	Label	Released	Ref	Notes
Edith Sitwell, Constant Lambert	instrumental ensemble	William Walton	Decca	1929		
Edith Sitwell, David Horner	instrumental ensemble	Frederik Prausnitz	Columbia	1949		
Edith Sitwell, Peter Pears	English Opera Group Ensemble	Anthony Collins	Decca	1954		
Vera Zorina	Philadelphia Orchestra	Eugene Ormandy	Columbia	1961		
Hermione Gingold, Russell Oberlin	instrumental ensemble	Thomas Dunn	Decca	1964		
Cleo Laine, Annie Ross	instrumental ensemble	John Dankworth	Fontana	1967		
Fenella Fielding, Michael Flanders	Academy of St. Martin-in-the-Fields	Neville Marriner	EMI	1972		
Peggy Ashcroft, Paul Scofield	London Sinfonietta	Sir William Walton	Decca	1972		
Tony Randall	Columbia Chamber Ensemble	Arthur Fiedler	Columbia	1976		
Cathy Berberian, Robert Tear	instrumental ensemble	Steuart Bedford	Oxford University Press	1980		Including premiere recording of Façade 2
Nancie Kennedy	instrumental ensemble	David Zinman	Rochester Chamber Music Soc	1982		
Prunella Scales, Timothy West	London Mozart Players	Jane Glover	ASV	1989		Includes 15 Sitwell poems without music
Peggy Ashcroft, Jeremy Irons	London Sinfonietta	Riccardo Chailly	Decca	1989		Including Façade 2
Susana Walton, Richard Baker	City of London Sinfonia	Richard Hickox	Chandos	1990		Including Façade 2
Pamela Hunter	Melologos Ensemble	Silveer van den Broeck	Discover	1993		42 numbers including 9 without music
Lynn Redgrave	Chamber Music Soc of Lincoln Center	Joseph Silverstein	Arabesque	1997		Including Façade 2 and also 11 Sitwell poems without music
Eleanor Bron, Richard Stilgoe	Nash Ensemble	David Lloyd-Jones	Hyperion	2001		The complete extant numbers
Carole Boyd; Zeb Soanes	instrumental ensemble	John Wilson	Orchid	2017		
Hila Plitmann, Fred Child, Kevin Deas	Virginia Arts Festival Players	JoAnn Falletta	Naxos	2022		Including Façade 2
Tamsin Dalley, Roderick Williams	Orchestra of the Swan	Bruce O'Neil	Somm	2022		
