= Weston Hall, Northamptonshire =

Coordinates: 52.1175°N 1.1377°W

Weston Hall
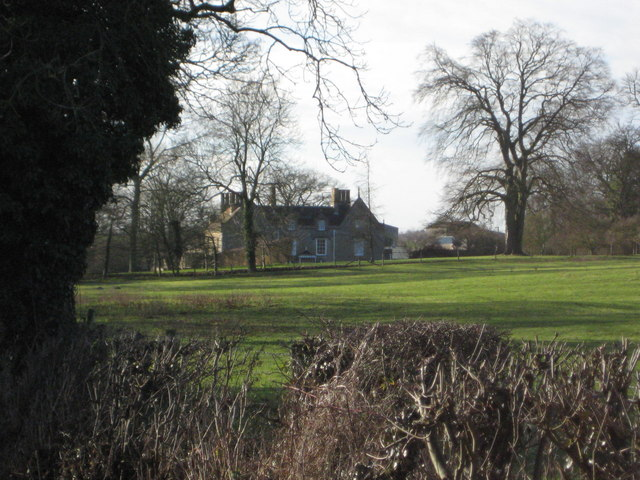
- Interactive map of the Weston Hall area

General information
- Architectural style: Tudor
- Location: England
- Completed: late 17th century
- Client: George Sitwell

Website
- westonhall.org

Weston Hall is a 17th-century manor house in Weston, Northamptonshire. The house was owned by the Sitwell family's ancestors from 1714 to 2021. It is a Grade II* listed building.

== History ==
The manor house dates to the 17th century, and is believed to have been built by William Hiccocke, c. 1680-90. It was enlarged in the 1770s; in the early 19th century it was remodelled in the Tudor style.

The house is situated in the village of Weston in the south of the county. It was given to the Sitwell family's ancestor Susanna Jennens in 1714 as a St. Valentine's Day present from her father Sir John Blencowe, who lived at nearby Marston St Lawrence, after the death of her husband. The property was then inherited through the female line until Sacheverell's father, the eccentric Sir George Sitwell, took a lease on the house from an aunt. The library still contained a recipe book written by Susanna Jennens' mother Anne Blencowe, which was published in 1925.

The house was the home of Sir Sacheverell Sitwell from 1927 until his death in 1988. His Canadian wife, Georgia Doble, also lived here until her death in 1980. It was here that Sacheverell wrote many of his 130 books on travel, art, music and poetry. After Sacheverell's death, it passed to his second son, Francis Sitwell, while the elder son, Sir Reresby Sitwell, took Renishaw.

The house was shared by Francis Sitwell's sons, George Sitwell, 8th baronet, and his brother William Sitwell, a food writer who ran a supper club at the house, until it was sold in 2021. During preparations for an auction of the building's contents, an 18th-century drawing by Giovanni Battista Tiepolo was discovered in the loft. Bought by Osbert Sitwell in 1936, it depicts the Pulcinella character from commedia dell'arte, and sold for £100,000 at auction.

== See also ==
- Renishaw Hall
