= The Sitwells =

20th century sibling writers and literary personas

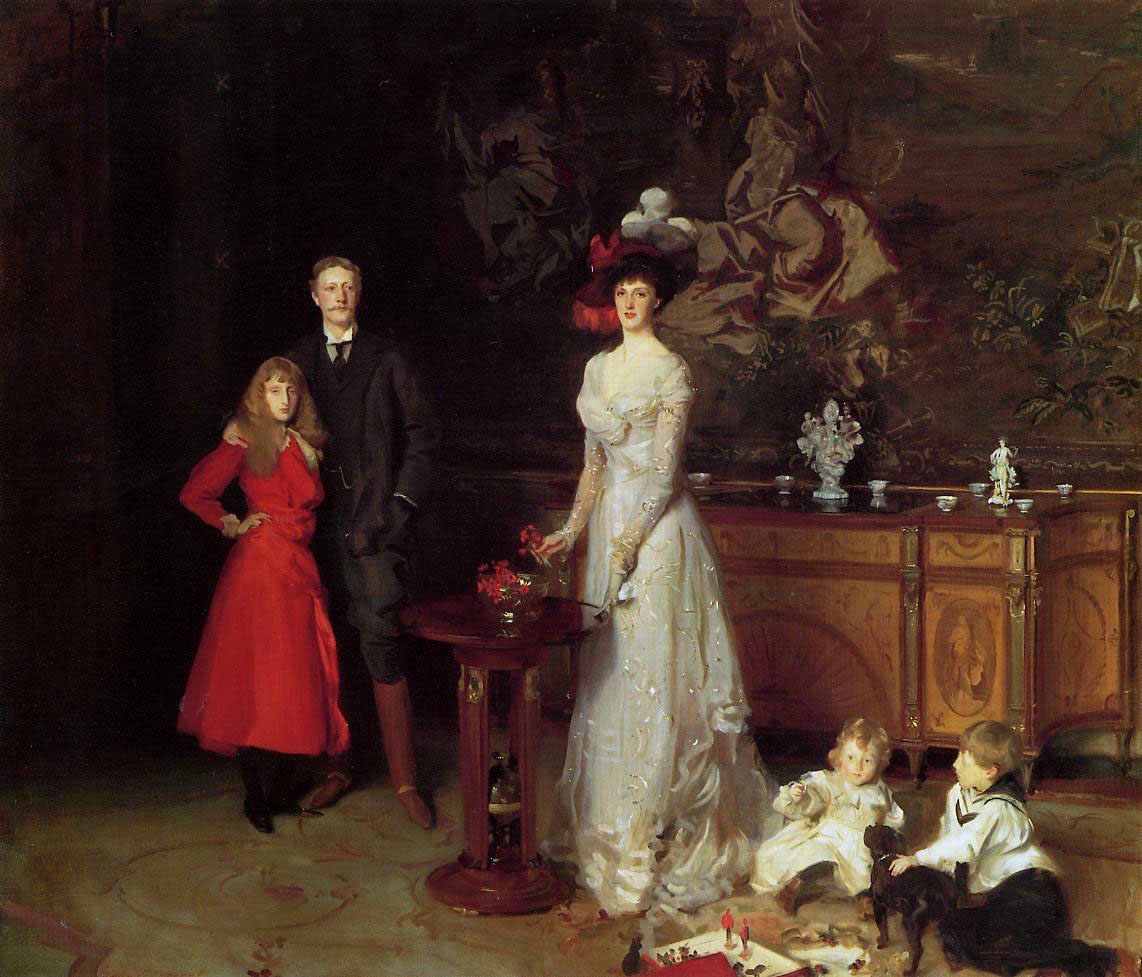
John Singer Sargent, The Sitwell Family, 1900. Private collection. From left: Edith Sitwell (1887–1964), Sir George Sitwell, Lady Ida, Sacheverell Sitwell (1897–1988), and Osbert Sitwell (1892–1969).

In 1926: left to right Osbert, Edith, Sacheverell, William Walton, and, with the Façade megaphone, Neil Porter of the Old Vic.

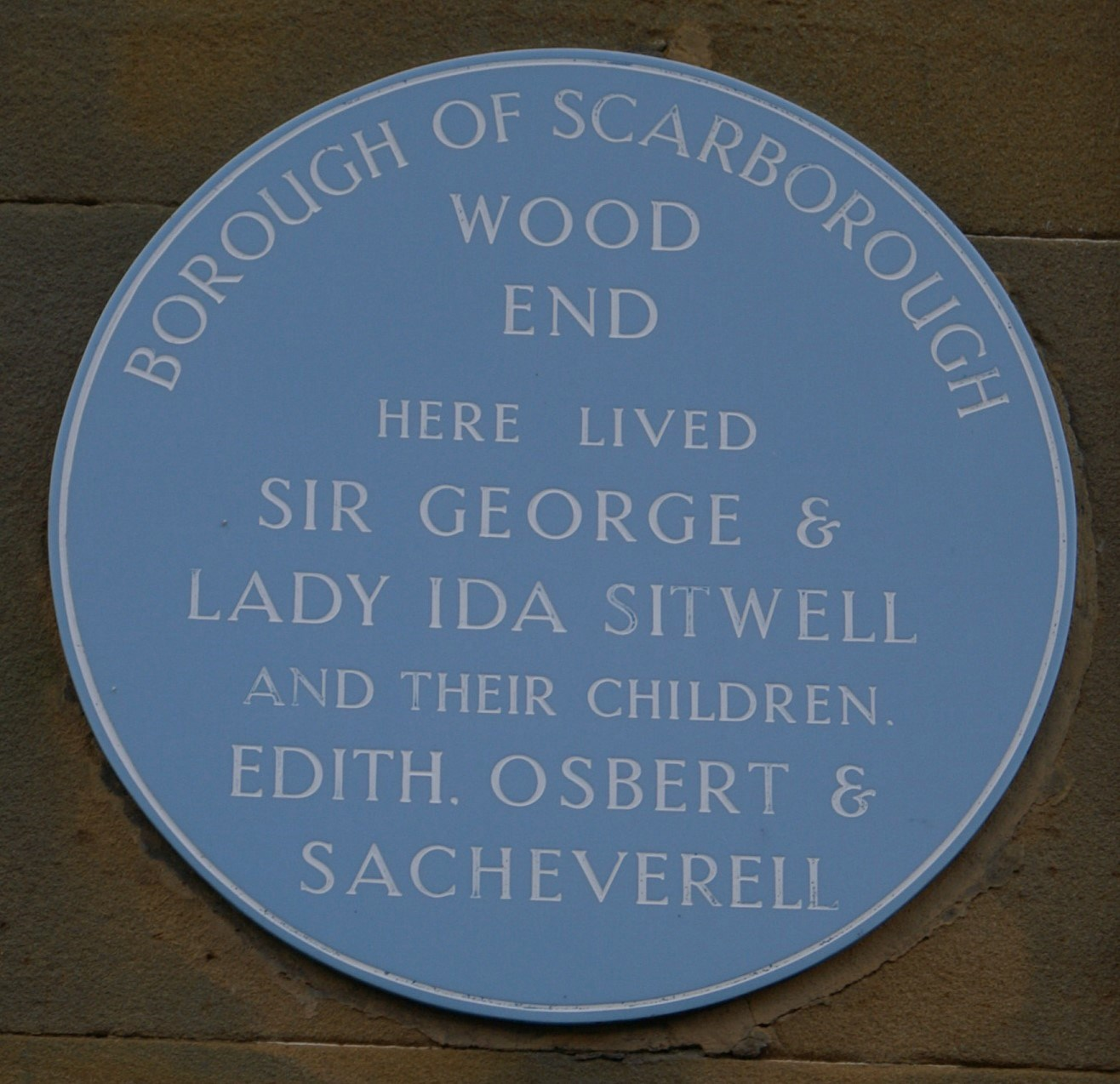
Blue plaque on Wood End in Scarborough, one of the family homes of the Sitwells

The Sitwells (Edith Sitwell, Osbert Sitwell, Sacheverell Sitwell), from Scarborough, North Yorkshire and the family seat of Renishaw Hall, were three siblings who formed an identifiable literary and artistic clique around themselves in London in the period roughly 1916 to 1930. This was marked by some well-publicised events, notably Edith's Façade with music by William Walton, with its public debut in 1923. All three Sitwells wrote; for a while their circle was considered by some to rival Bloomsbury, though others dismissed them as attention-seekers rather than serious artists.

== Wheels anthologies ==
The first Sitwell venture was the series of Wheels anthologies produced from 1916. These were seen either as a counterweight to the contemporary Edward Marsh Georgian Poetry anthologies, or as light 'society verse' collections. They did not really match the Imagist anthologies of the same years, or the modernist wing, in terms of finding poets with important careers ahead of them, but included both Nancy Cunard and Aldous Huxley.

=== Wheels 1916 ===
Nancy Cunard, Arnold James, V. T. Perowne, Helen Rootham, Edith Sitwell, Osbert Sitwell, Sacheverell Sitwell, Edward Tennant, Iris Tree

=== Wheels 1917 ===
Aldous Huxley, Arnold James, Helen Rootham, Edith Sitwell, Osbert Sitwell, Sacheverell Sitwell, Edward Tennant, Iris Tree, Sherard Vines

=== Wheels 1918 ===
Álvaro Guevara, Aldous Huxley, Arnold James, Edith Sitwell, Osbert Sitwell, Sacheverell Sitwell, Iris Tree, Sherard Vines

=== Wheels 1919 ===
Aldous Huxley, Arnold James, Wilfred Owen, Francesco Quevedo, Edith Sitwell, Osbert Sitwell, Sacheverell Sitwell, Iris Tree, Sherard Vines

=== Wheels 1920 ===
John J. Adams, Leah McTavish Cohen, Geoffrey Cookson, Aldous Huxley, Alan Porter, William Kean Seymour, Edith Sitwell, Osbert Sitwell, Sacheverell Sitwell, Sherard Vines

=== Wheels 1921 ===
H. R. Barber, Aldous Huxley, Charles Orange, Alan Porter, Augustine Rivers, Paul Selver, Edith Sitwell, Osbert Sitwell, Sacheverell Sitwell, Sherard Vines

== Coat of arms ==
Barry of eight or and vert, charged with three lions rampant sable. The motto is Ne cede malis (Latin: Yield not to misfortune).

== Legacy ==
Wood End, the former family home of the Sitwells in Scarborough has been redeveloped into a "creative industries centre" providing artists' workspace as well as administrative and learning spaces. Weston Hall in Northamptonshire, owned by the Sitwell family, was sold in 2021.

A large collection of the Sitwells' papers reside at the Harry Ransom Humanities Research Center at The University of Texas, Austin.

== See also ==
- Edith Sitwell
- Osbert Sitwell
- Sacheverell Sitwell
- Sitwell baronets
- William Sitwell
