= Martha Sitwell =

British aristocrat and television personality

Martha, Lady Sitwell
- Born: Martha de Blank
- Occupations: Television personality; socialite; model
- Spouse: Sir George Sitwell, 8th Baronet (divorced)
- Children: 1

Martha Sitwell, Lady Sitwell (née de Blank) is a British television personality, socialite, and former model. She is the former wife of Sir George Reresby Sacheverell Sitwell, 8th Baronet. In 2026, she joined the cast of the British reality television series Ladies of London.

== Early life and education ==
Lady Sitwell grew up in an affluent, well-connected family. She is the second of three daughters of restaurateurs Justin de Blank and Melanie de Blank. She was educated at boarding schools and at a girl's comprehensive school in London. She had an older sister, Polly, who later died after struggling with bipolar disorder.

She was raped by a family friend when she was eleven years old. Upon being expelled from school as a teenager, her parents threw her out and she spent a period of that time homeless.

== Career ==
Lady Sitwell worked as a fashion stylist, designer, and make-up artist. She was also a model for Vivienne Westwood.

In 2026, she became a main cast member on the British reality television series Ladies of London.

== Personal life ==
She was married to the businessman and aristocrat Sir George Reresby Sacheverell Sitwell, 8th Baronet for a decade before they divorced in 2017. During their marriage, she managed the Sitwell family seat, Weston Hall. She was later in a relationship with Harry Primrose, Lord Dalmeny that ended in 2022, prior to his second marriage.

She has one son, Conor, whom she gave birth to when she was seventeen years old.

== Filmography ==
Martha Switwell's television work
Year	Title	Role	Notes
2026	Ladies of London	Herself	Main Cast
