= Agamemnon's Tomb =

"Agamemnon's Tomb" is a poem by Sacheverell Sitwell. It was first published in 1933, the fifth of twenty poems in Canons of Giant Art: Twenty Torsos in Heroic Landscapes.

It was included in Collected Poems of Sacheverell Sitwell (1936), published by Duckworth, and was praised as a "high-water mark" of the volume for "its moving force and its evocative power." The same year, it was also included in The Oxford Book of Modern Verse, 1892-1935, edited by W. B. Yeats. In 1972, a standalone chapbook of the poem was printed as a limited edition of 265 copies.

Sitwell's sister, Edith Sitwell, a literary critic known for her effusive praise of her brother's poetry, calls "Agamemnon's tomb" "one of the greatest poems written in the English language for over a century." The author Samuel Hynes singles out "Agamemnon's Tomb" as the only poem by Sitwell which seems to be written "out of his deepest self," describing it as "a powerful meditation on death."
