= George Reresby Sacheverell Sitwell =

British businessman (born 1967)

Sir George Sitwell, 8th Baronet
- Born: 22 April 1967 (age 58)
- Occupation: businessman
- Spouse: Martha de Blank (divorced)
- Family: Sitwell family

Sir George Reresby Sacheverell Sitwell, 8th Baronet (born 22 April 1967) is a British businessman.

== Early life ==
Sitwell was born in 1967, the elder son of Francis Trajan Sacheverell Sitwell (1935–2004) and the grandson of writer and critic Sir Sacheverell Sitwell, 6th Baronet. He is the great-nephew of writer Sir Osbert Sitwell, 5th Baronet, and of poet and critic Dame Edith Sitwell.

He inherited the Sitwell baronetcy from his uncle, Sir Reresby Sitwell, 7th Baronet. Due to his father and his uncle being "never in harmony", Sir Reresby bequeathed the Sitwell family seat, Renishaw Hall, Derbyshire, to his daughter Alexandra, Mrs Rick Hayward. Consequently, the house and estate are now separated from the Renishaw baronetcy for the first time in the family's history.

== Career ==
Sitwell has worked as an investment banker and as head of finance for a film production company, and co-founded an IT staffing group before turning to property development.

== Personal life ==
Sitwell was formerly married to Martha de Blank. They had no children. The heir presumptive to the baronetcy is his younger brother, the restaurant critic William Ronald Sacheverell Sitwell.

Baronetage of the United Kingdom
Preceded by Reresby Sitwell	Baronet (of Renishaw); 2009–present	Incumbent
