= Rick Hayward =

British businessman

- Born: Richard A. Hayward; 17 March 1952 (age 74); Nassau, Bahamas
- Occupation: Businessman
- Title: Chairman of Wolverhampton Wanderers F.C. (2003–2006)
- Predecessor: Sir Jack Hayward OBE
- Successor: Steve Morgan

Richard A. Hayward (born 17 March 1952) is a British businessman who was chairman of the English association football club Wolverhampton Wanderers from 2003 to 2006. He is the eldest son of Sir Jack Hayward.

== Biography ==
Hayward was educated at Gordonstoun before completing an art degree at the University of Edinburgh. He worked for his father's businesses in the Bahamas before embarking on an entrepreneurial career. His various business projects have included a property company, a wine business and several bars and restaurants in the Bahamas. He also owns numerous properties in the United Kingdom and the Bahamas. He frequently visits, as well as manages, his father's shooting estate, Dunmaglass.

He became Wolverhampton Wanderers F.C. chairman when his father retired in December 2003 after failing to find a purchaser or new investors for the club. He had already served as a club director since 1997. He stepped down as chairman in July 2006, citing increased business commitments as the reason for his decision.

He is married to Alexandra (née Sitwell), owner of Renishaw Hall. The couple have five children, Rupert, Giles, Bertie, Munchie and Rosie. Rupert also briefly served as a Wolves director.
