= Joshua Rowntree =

British Liberal MP and Quaker

Member of Parliament for Scarborough
- In office 27 July 1886 – 26 July 1892
- Preceded by: Sir George Sitwell
- Succeeded by: Sir George Sitwell

Editor of The Friend
- In office 1872–1875
- Preceded by: John Frank
- Succeeded by: John Stephenson Rowntree

Personal details
- Born: 6 April 1844
- Died: 10 February 1915 (aged 70)
- Party: Gladstonian liberal

Joshua Rowntree (6 April 1844 – 10 February 1915) was elected Member of Parliament (MP) for Scarborough in 1886. Rowntree served as a Gladstonian Liberal until 1892, when he was succeeded by the Conservative, Sir George Reresby Sitwell, whom he had previously defeated in 1886.

== Early life ==
He was educated at Bootham School, York.

== Quakers ==
He was an active Quaker. After he left Parliament, in 1892, he 'gave himself with whole heart and mind to the modern interpretation of Quakerism'. He took a quiet part in enabling British Friends to come to terms with scientific discoveries and biblical criticism and with shaking off outdated customs—notably through the Manchester conference (1895), Scarborough summer school (1897), and the establishment in 1903 of a study centre at Woodbrooke, Birmingham. He was editor of The Friend from 1872 to 1875.

He gave the Swarthmore Lecture in 1913 under the title Social Service – Its Place in the Society of Friends.

== Joshua Rowntree's publications ==
- Opium habit in the East: A study of the evidence given to the Royal Commission on Opium, 1893–94. P. S. King & Son: Westminster, 1895.
- Applied Christianity and War. An address. [c. 1904.]
- The Imperial Drug Trade. Methuen, First edition, 1905, Second edition, 1906
- Social Service, its place in the Society of Friends. (Series: Swarthmore Lectures) Headley Bros.: London, 1913.

Parliament of the United Kingdom
| Preceded by Sir George Sitwell | Member of Parliament for Scarborough; 1886–1892 | Succeeded by Sir George Sitwell |
