= Social Service: Its Place in the Society of Friends =

1913 lecture by Joshua Rowntree

Social Service: Its Place in the Society of Friends was the title of the controversial Swarthmore Lecture given by Joshua Rowntree, a Liberal politician, in 1913. The principal subject was the question of what would be the appropriate Friends' view on industrial schools and other institutions providing free secondary education. Conservative members of the society were discontent with the strong pro-industrial school sentiment of the lecture. The lecture was published as a book by Headley Brothers in 1913.
