= Façade (entertainment) =

Series of poems by Edith Sitwell

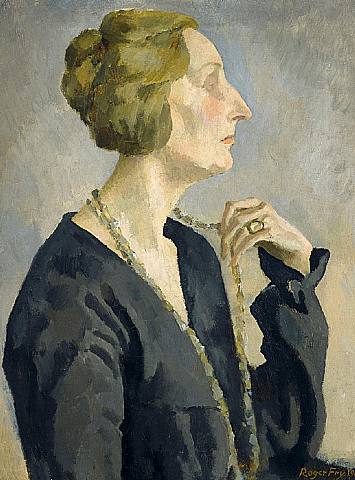
Edith Sitwell in 1912, by Roger Fry

Façade is a series of poems by Edith Sitwell, best known as part of Façade – An Entertainment in which the poems are recited over an instrumental accompaniment by William Walton. The poems and the music exist in several versions.

Sitwell began to publish some of the Façade poems in 1918, in the literary magazine Wheels. In 1922 many of them were given an orchestral accompaniment by Walton, Sitwell's protégé. The "entertainment" was first performed in public on 12 June 1923 at the Aeolian Hall in London, and achieved both fame and notoriety for its unconventional form. Walton arranged two suites of his music for full orchestra. When Frederick Ashton made a ballet of Façade in 1931, Sitwell did not wish her poems to be part of it, and the orchestral arrangements were used.

After Sitwell's death, Walton published supplementary versions of Façade for speaker and small ensemble using numbers dropped between the premiere and the publication of the full score in 1951.

== Versions ==
Façade exists in several strongly contrasted versions, principally:

- Edith Sitwell's Façade and Other Poems, 1920–1935 – the published versions of those of the poems chosen by the author for her 1950 volume of collected verse.
- The Sitwell-Walton Façade (1951) – the first, and definitive published version of the full score of the entertainment
- Façade Revived (1977) – a set of eight poems and settings not included in the 1951 version, published by Walton to mark his 75th birthday
- Façade II (1979) – a revised version of Façade Revived, with some numbers dropped and others added
- Façade – the complete version, 1922–1928 – a 42-number CD set compiled and performed by Pamela Hunter (1993) restoring all the poems that Walton set, and nine that he did not set.
- Walton's orchestral Façade Suites (1926 and 1938)

A table showing the various permutations can be seen here.

== Sitwell's published Façade poems ==
It is sometimes said that the Façade verses are nonsense poetry, in the tradition of Edward Lear. But despite the experiments with sound and rhythm, there is meaning in Sitwell's poems. The literary scholar Jack Lindsay wrote, "The associations are often glancing and rapid in the extreme, but the total effect comes from a highly organized basis of sense." Other writers have detected personal references in the Façade poems. Christopher Palmer lists many references to Sitwell's unhappy childhood, from the kind Mariner Man (her father's valet who entertained her with seafaring stories) to the implacable Mrs Behemoth (her mother).

The Façade poems published by Sitwell in her 1950 collection, Façade and other Poems, 1920–1935 are:

- The Drum
- Clowns' Houses
- Said King Pompey
- The Bat
- Lullaby for Jumbo
- Trio for Two Cats and a Trombone
- Madame Mouse trots
- Four in the Morning
- Black Mrs Behemoth
- The Wind's Bastinado
- En Famille
- Country Dance
- Mariner Man
- The Octogenarian
- Bells of Grey Crystal
- When Cold December
- Came the Great Popinjay
- Fox Trot
- Polka
- Mazurka
- Jodelling Song
- Scotch Rhapsody
- Waltz
- Popular Song
- By the Lake
- The Avenue
- Water Party
- The Satyr in the Periwig
- Dark Song
- "I do like to be beside the Seaside"
- Hornpipe
- Something lies beyond the Scene
- When Sir Beelzebub

== The Sitwell–Walton Façade – An Entertainment ==
The "entertainment" Façade, in which Sitwell's poems are recited over an instrumental accompaniment by Walton, was first given privately in the Sitwell family's London house on 24 January 1922. The first public performance was given at the Aeolian Hall, London, on 12 June 1923. On both occasions, the author recited the verse and the composer conducted the ensemble.

The Sitwells and William Walton: left to right Osbert, Edith, Sacheverell, Walton, and, with the Façade megaphone, Neil Porter of the Old Vic

Walton made changes to the instrumentation for the entertainment between its premiere and the publication of the first printed score nearly thirty years later, but in both 1922–23 and 1951 he scored for six players. The published score specifies flute (doubling piccolo), clarinet (doubling bass clarinet), alto saxophone, trumpet, percussion, and cello. Walton quotes a range of earlier composers in his score, from Rossini (the William Tell overture appears in the Swiss Jodelling Song) to George Grossmith (whose comic song, "See me dance the polka", is present throughout Walton's Polka).

In the Sitwell–Walton Façade there are three poems, "Through Gilded Trellises", "A Man from a far Country" (from Sitwell's The Sleeping Beauty), and "Tarantella" (never formally published by Sitwell), that do not feature in her published edition of Façade. As the performing version frequently recited in public and recorded for the gramophone by Sitwell included the Tarantella, it may be assumed that she did not require the musical version to adhere strictly to the text of the published poems.

The public premiere of the entertainment was a succès de scandale. The performance consisted of Sitwell's verses, which she recited through a megaphone protruding through a decorated screen, while Walton conducted an ensemble of six players in his accompanying music. The press was generally condemnatory. One contemporary headline read: "Drivel That They Paid to Hear". The Daily Express loathed the work, but admitted that it was naggingly memorable. Manchester Guardian wrote of "relentless cacophony". The Observer condemned the verses and dismissed Walton's music as "harmless". In The Illustrated London News, Edward J. Dent was much more appreciative: "The audience was at first inclined to treat the whole thing as an absurd joke, but there is always a surprisingly serious element in Miss Sitwell's poetry and Mr Walton's music ... which soon induced the audience to listen with breathless attention." In The Sunday Times, Ernest Newman said of Walton, "as a musical joker he is a jewel of the first water". Among the audience were Evelyn Waugh, Virginia Woolf and Noël Coward. The last was so outraged by the avant-garde nature of Sitwell's verses and the staging, that he marched out ostentatiously during the performance. The players did not like the work: the clarinettist asked the composer, "Mr Walton, has a clarinet player ever done you an injury?" Nevertheless, the work soon became accepted, and within a decade Walton's music was used for the popular Façade ballet, choreographed by Frederick Ashton.

The work's American premiere, in New York, was at the Museum of Modern Art on 19 January 1949. Sitwell read all but one of her poems (David Horner recited "Tango"), and Frederick Prausnitz conducted instrumentalists from the Juilliard School. The performance took place on the museum's fourth floor; microphones and amplification brought it to the audience in the museum's auditorium.

Walton revised the music continually between its first performance and the first publication of the full score in 1951. That definitive version of the Sitwell–Walton Façade consists of:

- Fanfare (Instrumental)
- Hornpipe
- En Famille
- Mariner Man
- Long Steel Grass (Trio for Two Cats and a Trombone)
- Through Gilded Trellises [from The Sleeping Beauty]
- Tango-Pasodoble (I do like to be beside the Seaside)
- Lullaby for Jumbo
- Black Mrs Behemoth
- Tarantella
- A Man from a far Country [from The Sleeping Beauty]
- By the Lake
- Country Dance
- Polka
- Four in the Morning
- Something lies beyond the Scene
- Waltz
- Swiss Jodelling Song
- Scotch Rhapsody
- Popular Song
- Fox Trot (Old Sir Faulk)
- When Sir Beelzebub.

== Walton's later additions ==
In the 1970s, Walton released some further numbers, under the title Façade Revived, later revising, dropping and adding numbers, as Façade II.

Façade Revived comprises:

- Daphne
- Came the Great Popinjay
- The Last Gallop
- The Octogenarian
- March (Ratatatan)
- The White Owl
- Aubade – Jane, Jane
- Said King Pompey

The work was premiered at the Plaisterers' Hall, London on 25 March 1977, with Richard Baker as reciter and the English Bach Festival Ensemble conducted by Charles Mackerras.

Façade II comprises:

- Came the Great Popinjay
- Aubade – Jane, Jane
- March (Ratatatan)
- Madam Mouse Trots
- The Octogenarian
- Gardener Janus Catches a Naiad
- Water Party
- Said King Pompey

This version was premiered at the Aldeburgh Festival on 19 June 1979, with Sir Peter Pears as reciter and an ensemble conducted by Steuart Bedford.

== Complete 1922–1928 version ==
When the most comprehensive edition of the Sitwell-Walton versions was released in 1993 (on a CD featuring the voice of the Façade specialist Pamela Hunter with the Melologos ensemble) the number of poems had risen to 42. Pamela Hunter recites all these poems on the 1993 CD, including the nine (indicated by an asterisk, below) for which there are no extant musical accompaniments.

- Madame Mouse trots
- The Octogenarian
- Aubade – Jane, Jane
- The Wind's Bastinado*
- Said King Pompey
- Lullaby for Jumbo
- Small Talk I
- Small Talk II*
- Rose Castles
- Hornpipe
- Trio for Two Cats and a Trombone (Long Steel Grass)
- When Sir Beelzebub.
- Switchback*
- Bank Holiday I*
- Bank Holiday II*
- Springing Jack*
- En Famille
- Mariner Man
- Came the Great Popinjay
- Ass-Face*
- The Last Gallop
- The White Owl
- Gardener Janus
- Mazurka – God Pluto is a Kindly Man*
- Trams*
- Scotch Rhapsody
- Fox Trot
- Four in the Morning
- Popular Song
- By the Lake
- Black Mrs Behemoth
- Waltz
- Jodelling Song
- Polka
- Daphne
- A Man from a far Country
- Country Dance
- March
- Through Gilded Trellises
- "I do like to be beside the Seaside" (Tango-Pasodoble)
- Tarantella
- Something lies beyond the Scene

After this recording was made in 1993, evidence of additional numbers that were included in the June 1923 performance of Façade came to light. As noted by Stewart Craggs, a copy of the programme for this performance emerged which indicated that 28 poems by Sitwell were set by Walton, including four that were previously unknown, having been lost and forgotten in the intervening years: Clown Argheb's Song, Dark Song, Gone Dry and Serenade. A detailed chronology of the various versions of Façade has been given by Stephen Lloyd, who notes that Serenade may have been a recited poem or a purely instrumental piece.

== Three Songs ==
Walton set three selections from Façade as art-songs for soprano and piano (1932), to be sung with full voice rather than spoken rhythmically. These are:

1. Daphne
2. Through Gilded Trellises
3. Old Sir Faulk

== Façade Suites ==
The first of Walton's two Façade suites for full orchestra was published in 1926. Walton conducted the first performance. The suite consists of:

1. Polka
2. Waltz
3. Swiss Jodelling Song
4. Tango-Pasodoble
5. Tarantella Sevillana

The second suite was premiered in 1938, with John Barbirolli conducting the New York Philharmonic. It consists of:

1. Fanfare
2. Scotch Rhapsody
3. Country Dance
4. Noche Espagnole
5. Popular Song
6. Old Sir Faulk – Foxtrot

The orchestra for both comprises 2 flutes, piccolo, 2 oboes, cor anglais, 2 clarinets, 2 bassoons, 4 horns, 2 trumpets, trombone, tuba, timpani, 3 percussionists (side drum, cymbals, xylophone, tambourine, bass drum, triangle, glockenspiel, castanets, rattle), and strings. Constant Lambert made an arrangement of both suites for piano duet.

A third suite, arranged by Christopher Palmer, was published in 1992, consisting of:

1. Hornpipe
2. Daphne (Song)
3. March
4. Through Gilded Trellises
5. Water Party Waltz
6. The Wind's Tambourine

The orchestra comprises: 2 flutes (both doubling piccolo), 2 oboes (2nd doubling cor anglais), 2 clarinets (2nd doubling bass clarinet), alto saxophone, 2 bassoons, 2 horns, 2 trumpets, trombone, tuba, timpani, 4 percussionists (side drum, large ide drum, field drum, bass drum, bass drum with cymbal, drum kit, wood block, castanets, maracas, tambourine, triangle, cymbals, suspended cymbal, tam-tam, glockenspiel, xylophone), piano (doubling celesta), and strings

== Façade ballets ==
Façade was first made into a ballet by Günter Hess for the German Chamber Dance Theatre in 1929. In 1931 Frederick Ashton created another ballet version. Both used the First Façade Suite. For Ashton's version the Scotch Rhapsody and Popular Song were added to the First Suite. Ashton later expanded the ballet to include the Country Dance, Noche Espagnole and the Foxtrot, Old Sir Faulk.

In 1972, to mark Walton's seventieth birthday, Ashton created a new ballet using the score of the "entertainment". It was premiered at the Aldeburgh Festival, with Peter Pears as the reciter.

== Selected discography ==
Façade – An Entertainment

- Sitwell-Walton version: Edith Sitwell, Peter Pears (reciters), English Opera Group Ensemble, Anthony Collins. Decca LXT2977 (1954)
- Expanded Sitwell-Walton version: Pamela Hunter (reciter), Melologos Ensemble, Silveer van den Broeck. Discover DICD 920125 (1993)

Façade Suites

- Orchestra of the Royal Opera House, Covent Garden, Anatole Fistoulari. RCA SB2039 (1959)
- Bournemouth Symphony Orchestra, Andrew Litton. Decca 470 508-2DC4 (2002)
- Andrew West and Ronald Woodley (piano duet, arr. Lambert). SOMM CD 0614 (2020)

Three Songs from Façade

- Kiri Te Kanawa, soprano, Richard Amner, accompanist, on the album A Portrait of Kiri Te Kanawa. CBS 74116 (1984)
