= I Live Under a Black Sun =

1937 book by Edith Sitwell

First edition

I Live Under a Black Sun is a novelized biography of Jonathan Swift by poet Edith Sitwell. Her debut novel, it is a modernist work, and was published in 1937, straddling her productive period of poetry in the 1920s and the 1940s. Though primarily biographical fiction, it includes thematic treatments on mourning and melancholia, and political allegory.

The novel was the first to be published with Victor Gollancz, after leaving her former publisher Duckworth. At the time of its publication, the novel did not receive much critical acclaim. However, contemporary writers, including Evelyn Waugh and Edwin Muir found the novel successful.
