= David Stuart Horner =

English crime fiction novelist (1900–1983)

David Stuart Horner (29 July 1900 – 1983) was an English crime fiction novelist and the longtime partner of Osbert Sitwell.

== Early life ==
David Stuart Horner was born on 29 July 1900, the son of John Stuart Horner (b. 1855) and Emily Green, the daughter of Col. James Francis Birch, of the 3rd West India Regiment. He was a member of the Horner family of Mells Manor, Somerset. According to Horner himself, "I am directly descended from Little Jack Horner (Henry VIII) who was lampooned in the nursery rhyme – the 'Plum' being the property of Mells bought by my ancestor when the monks were kicked out of Glastonbury Abbey – his enemies said that he had stolen the title deeds: Mells, which now belongs to my first cousin Katharine [Horner] Asquith, is once again in the hands of a Catholic." According to Osbert Sitwell, Horner's future companion, "The Horners are probably one of the few Saxon families still extant. [...] I am rather bored with the Normans and consider them nouveaux riches."

Horner attended Eton College and then Trinity Hall, Cambridge, and obtained a BA degree in History and Modern Languages. According to Sarah Bradford, Sacheverell Sitwell's biographer, "At Cambridge, a male admirer addressed Horner as 'Beauteous Adonis': he was pale, willowy and elegant, with a finely drawn profile and blond."

== Career ==
According to John Pearson, the Sitwells' biographer, "David dressed superbly, had an amusing line of gossip about all the best people, which he recounted in an engagingly basso profundo voice, and after leaving Cambridge was soon floating, as unattached, good-looking, upper-class young Englishmen could float in those more gentle, far-off days, through a rarely failing world of dinner-parties, long weekends and holidays abroad. He was the perfect guest, the ideal ornament for any party, charming to women and agreeable to men, better connected and far better read than the usual run of gilded social butterflies, and equally at home in the best society in Paris or in London."

Before World War II, Horner published two books based on his life in France: Through French Windows (1938) and Was It Yesterday? (1939).

During World War II he served as a Squadron-Leader in the Royal Air Force.

In 1959 David Stuart Horner published a crime novel, The Devil's Quill, inspired by the killing of Horner's elder brother, Maurice Stuart Horner (1893–1943), a murder which remains unsolved today. Maurice Horner is buried in St Andrew's Churchyard, Mells.

Adrian Wright, the biographer of L. P. Hartley (Hartley was a good friend of Horner; they met through Sitwell in 1933), said that, despite the downplay of many Sitwells' biographies, Horner was a "man of taste and literary ability".

== Personal life ==
Horner was the longtime companion of Sir Osbert Sitwell (1892–1969). They met at a London party in 1923, when Horner was an undergraduate at Cambridge. During their relationship, both of them had other affairs, Sitwell with art critic Adrian Stokes and Horner with Vicomte Bernard d'Hendecourt, with whom Horner lived for several years in Paris and from whom he received an inheritance. Horner and Sitwell lived together at Renishaw Hall, but they also had a flat in London, and wintered at Castello di Montegufoni in Italy, which was Horner's favorite residence. Edith Sitwell, who was living with them, disliked Horner. Somewhere around the 1950s the relationship deteriorated and by the 1960s they were estranged.

David Stuart Horner died in 1983; his obituary appeared in The Times on 7 January 1984. His manuscript collection was donated at the Eton College Library. The largest single collection of Sitwell papers is in the Harry Ransom Humanities Research Center at the University of Texas at Austin. It includes 951 letters from Osbert Sitwell to David Horner and it has been said that Horner sold them to the University of Texas out of spite for having been denied the inheritance of Montegufoni on Sitwell's death: Sitwell had removed Horner's name from his will, leaving his London flat to his male nurse, Frank Magro, and Montegufoni to his nephew.
