= William Sitwell =

British writer (born 1969)

William Sitwell DL
- Born: William Ronald Sacheverell Sitwell; 2 October 1969 (age 56); London, England
- Education: Eton College
- Alma mater: University of Kent
- Occupations: Editor, columnist
- Employer: The Daily Telegraph
- Relatives: Sir Sacheverell Sitwell, 6th Baronet (grandfather); Sir George Sitwell, 8th Baronet (brother)

William Ronald Sacheverell Sitwell DL (born 2 October 1969) is a British editor, writer, broadcaster, and restaurant critic for The Daily Telegraph. A member of the Sitwell family, he is the brother of George Reresby Sacheverell Sitwell and is heir presumptive to the family title. Sitwell served as editor of Waitrose Food from 2007 to 2016, during which time he became a prominent voice in British culinary culture. Sitwell has written extensively on food, travel, and lifestyle, and has frequently appeared as a broadcaster and commentator on gastronomy and hospitality.

== Early life and education ==
Sitwell is the younger son of Francis Trajan Sacheverell Sitwell (1935–2004) and the grandson of writer and critic Sir Sacheverell Sitwell, 6th Baronet. He is the great-nephew of writer Sir Osbert Sitwell, 5th Baronet and of poet and critic Dame Edith Sitwell. He is the heir presumptive to the Sitwell baronetcy currently held by his elder brother Sir George Sitwell, 8th Baronet.

He was educated at Eton College and the University of Kent, where he 'wrote a stupid kind of gossip column in the student newspaper.'

== Career ==
Sitwell is a regular on the British television series MasterChef UK and MasterChef: The Professionals as a judge.

In 2018 freelance journalist Selene Nelson emailed Sitwell, suggesting features on vegan-friendly recipes. Sitwell replied "How about a series on killing vegans, one by one. Ways to trap them? How to interrogate them properly? Expose their hypocrisy? Force-feed them meat?" After Nelson made Sitwell's response public, Sitwell resigned as editor of Waitrose Food, the in-house magazine for the Waitrose supermarket. The row caused much controversy over free speech and whether making an offensive joke was a sackable offence. Sitwell later met Nelson in person to apologise.

Sitwell later joined The Daily Telegraph as a restaurant critic, and hosts a dining programme with the paper called William Sitwell's Supper Club. In April 2020 he appeared as a guest in an episode of MasterChef, challenging contestants to produce "a plant-based dish".

In September 2019, he was appointed as a Deputy Lieutenant (DL) of Northamptonshire.

== Political views ==
In March 2024, Sitwell described himself as "a long-term Conservative supporter". Writing ahead of the 2024 general election, he stated that Chancellor Jeremy Hunt should "go out in a blaze of Conservative economic glory." Sitwell added that Hunt "could slash taxes, hand power to the regions (giving Councils real power to make a difference), roll out actual, working broadband (in rural areas and on trains), cancel HS2, stop the self-diagnosed as mentally oppressed from getting sick notes from their pliant GPs, champion our cities as places for the super-wealthy to invest and unlock the barriers to building development."

== Personal life ==
Sitwell has been married twice and has four children. He was married firstly to Laura McCorquodale on 4 September 2000. They had two children. After a divorce in 2017, Sitwell was married secondly on 1 December 2017 to the Hon Emily Lopes, daughter of Henry Massey Lopes, 3rd Baron Roborough. They have two sons. Sitwell is godfather to Mary, daughter of former Conservative MP Sir Jacob Rees-Mogg.

== Publications ==
- Eggs or Anarchy: The Remarkable Story of the Man Tasked with the Impossible: to Feed a Nation at War (2016)
- A History of Food in 100 Recipes (2017)
- The Really Quite Good British Cookbook (2017)
- The Restaurant: A 2,000-Year History of Dining Out (2020)
