= Lawson-Tancred baronets =

Title in the Baronetage of England

The Tancred, later Lawson-Tancred Baronetcy, of Boroughbridge in the County of York, is a title in the Baronetage of England. It was created on 17 November 1662 for Thomas Tancred. He was a descendant of Richard Tankard, who shortly after the Norman Conquest owned lands at Boroughbridge in Yorkshire, where the family remains.

== Tancred, later Lawson-Tancred baronets, of Boroughbridge (1662) ==
- Sir Thomas Tancred, 1st Baronet (died 1663)
- Sir William Tancred, 2nd Baronet (1625–1703)
- Sir Thomas Tancred, 3rd Baronet (1665–1744)
- Sir Thomas Tancred, 4th Baronet (died 1759)
- Sir Thomas Tancred, 5th Baronet (1755–1784)
- Sir Thomas Tancred, 6th Baronet (1780–1844)
- Sir Thomas Tancred, 7th Baronet (1808–1880)
- Sir Thomas Selby Tancred, 8th Baronet (1840–1910)
- Sir Thomas Selby Lawson-Tancred, 9th Baronet (1870–1945)
- Sir Henry Lawson-Tancred, 10th Baronet (1924–2010)
- Sir Andrew Peter Lawson-Tancred, 11th Baronet (born 1952)

== Sir Thomas Selby Lawson-Tancred, 9th Baronet ==
Lawson-Tancred married (later Dame) Margery Ellinor, eldest daughter and co-heir of Andrew Sherlock Lawson, younger brother of Sir John Grant Lawson, 1st Baronet (see Lawson baronets). In 1914 he assumed by deed poll the additional surname of Lawson. He died before her but his free-to-distribute assets were probated at £21,777 (equivalent to about £1,100,000 in 2023), rounded, in 1946.
