= Sitwell baronets =

Baronetcy in the Baronetage of the United Kingdom

Escutcheon of the Sitwell baronets

The Sitwell Baronetcy, of Renishaw in the County of Derby, is a title in the Baronetage of the United Kingdom. It was created on 3 October 1808 for Sitwell Sitwell, Member of Parliament for West Looe. The Sitwell family had been ironmasters and landowners in Eckington, Derbyshire, for many centuries.

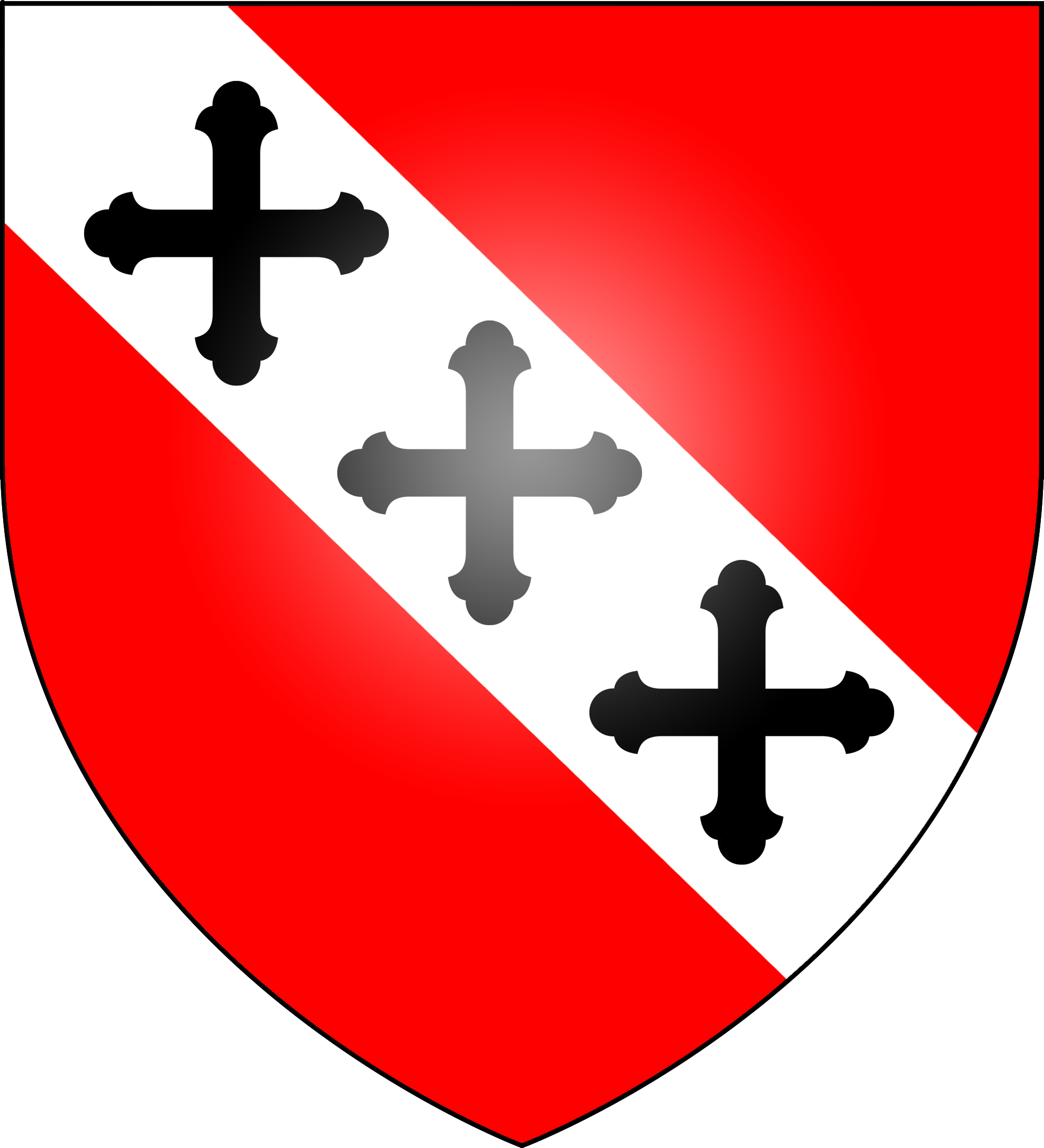
The coat of arms of Reresby, whose estates were inherited by the Sitwell baronets.

In 1625, George Sitwell (1600–1667), High Sheriff of Derbyshire in 1653, built Renishaw Hall, which remains the family seat. The family were to inherit the estates of two other families; Sacheverell, which died out in 1726, and Reresby, whose heiress married George Sitwell's grandson. George Sitwell's great-great-grandson Francis Hurt Sitwell (1728–1793), father of the first baronet, inherited Barmoor Castle, Northumberland. He was born Francis Hurt, the son of Jonathan Hurt and his wife Katherine Sitwell, heiress of the Sitwell family, and assumed the surname of Sitwell in lieu of his patronymic. The fourth baronet sat as Conservative Member of Parliament for Scarborough. His sons, the fifth and sixth baronets, were both noted poets and authors. Dame Edith Sitwell, his only daughter, was a poet and critic. The seventh Baronet was High Sheriff of Derbyshire in 1983 and a Deputy Lieutenant of the county.

The family seat was originally Renishaw Hall, near Eckington, Derbyshire. The present Baronet until recently resided at Weston Hall near Towcester, Northamptonshire which was sold in 2021.

== Coat of arms ==
Arms: Barry of eight Or and Vert, charged with three Lions rampant Sable; Crest: A Demi-Lion rampant erased Sable, holding between the paws an Escutcheon per pale Or and Vert; Motto: Ne cede malis (Latin: Yield not to misfortune).

== Sitwell baronets, of Renishaw (1808) ==
- Sir Sitwell Sitwell, 1st Baronet (1769–1811). He was made a Baronet in 1808, and was responsible for developing Renishaw. Sitwell married firstly Alice Parke (died 3 May 1797), sister of James Parke, 1st Baron Wensleydale, in 1791. He married secondly Caroline Stovin, in 1798. He had several children, all by his first wife. He was succeeded by his son.
- Sir George Sitwell, 2nd Baronet (1797–1853). He married in 1818 Susan Tait, sister of Archbishop Archibald Campbell Tait. They leased Balmoral Castle before it became a royal residence. They had several children. He was succeeded by his son.
- Sir Sitwell Reresby Sitwell, 3rd Baronet (1820–1862). Sitwell served in the 1st Life Guards. He married in 1857 Louisa Hely-Hutchinson, daughter of Colonel Henry Hely-Hutchinson, a veteran of the Battle of Waterloo, and niece of the 3rd Earl of Donoughmore. He was succeeded by his son.
- Sir George Reresby Sitwell, 4th Baronet (1860–1943). Sitwell succeeded as a minor. He served as Member of Parliament for Scarborough in 1885–6, and was Sheriff of Derbyshire in 1898. In 1909 he bought Montegufoni Castle in Italy. He married Lady Ida Emily Augusta Denison, daughter of William Denison, 1st Earl of Londesborough in 1886. Their three children were the famous literary trio. He was succeeded by his elder son.
- Sir (Francis) Osbert Sacheverell Sitwell, 5th Baronet (1892–1969). Sitwell fought as a captain in the First World War, in the Grenadier Guards. He became a notable writer and poet afterwards. He never married, and was succeeded by his brother.
- Sir Sacheverell Reresby Sitwell, 6th Baronet (1897–1988). He also served with the Grenadier Guards in the First World War, and became a notable writer and poet later on. In 1925 he married Georgia Doble, the daughter of a Canadian banker. He was succeeded by his elder son.
- Sir (Sacheverell) Reresby Sitwell, 7th Baronet (1927–2009). He married Penelope Forbes, the niece of Bernard Forbes, 8th Earl of Granard, in 1952. They had no sons, and he was succeeded by his nephew.
- Sir George Reresby Sacheverell Sitwell, 8th Baronet (b. 1967). The elder son of Francis Trajan Sacheverell Sitwell (1935–2004), younger son of the 6th Baronet. He married Martha de Blank and divorced without issue.

The heir presumptive is the present holder's brother William Ronald Sacheverell Sitwell (b. 1969), a food journalist.

The heir presumptive's heir apparent is his eldest son Albert Norman Francis Sacheverell Sitwell (born 2004).

== See also ==
- The Sitwells
- George Swinton, Lord Lyon King of Arms, maternal grandson of the 2nd Baronet

Baronetage of the United Kingdom
Preceded by Graham baronets	Sitwell baronets of Renishaw; 3 October 1808	Succeeded by Medlycott baronets
