= Sacheverell Sitwell =

English writer

Sir Sacheverell Sitwell Bt CH
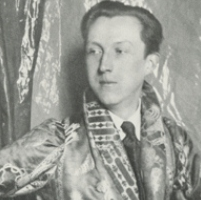
- Sitwell in 1927
- Born: Sacheverell Reresby Sitwell; 15 November 1897; Scarborough, North Yorkshire, England
- Died: 1 October 1988 (aged 90); Towcester, Northamptonshire, England
- Education: Balliol College, Oxford
- Occupation: Writer
- Spouse: Georgia Doble (m. 1925; died 1980)
- Children: 2, including Sir Reresby Sitwell, 7th Baronet
- Parent: Sir George Sitwell, 4th Baronet
- Relatives: Edith Sitwell (sister); Osbert Sitwell (brother); George Sitwell (grandson); William Sitwell (grandson)
- Writing career
- Period: 1918–1986

Sir Sacheverell Reresby Sitwell, 6th Baronet, CH (/sæˈʃɛvərəl/ sash-EV-ər-əl; 15 November 1897 – 1 October 1988) was an English writer, particularly on baroque architecture, and an art and music critic. Sitwell produced some 50 volumes of poetry and some 50 works on art, music, architecture, and travel.

== Early life ==
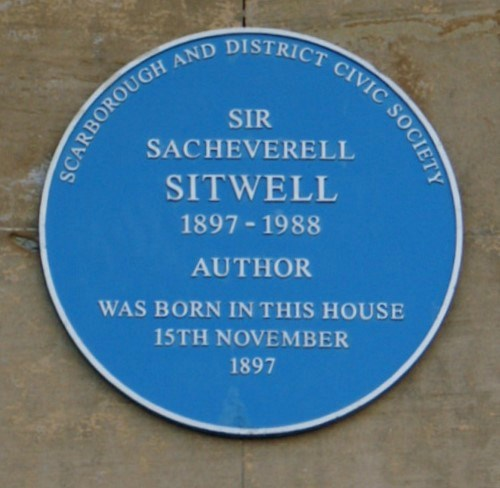
Blue plaque on Wood End, the house in Scarborough where Sacheverell Sitwell was born

Sitwell was born in Scarborough, North Yorkshire on 15 November 1897 and brought up in Derbyshire. He was the youngest child of Sir George Sitwell, 4th Baronet, of Renishaw Hall, and the former Lady Ida Emily Augusta Denison. Dame Edith Sitwell and Sir Osbert Sitwell were his older siblings.

His paternal grandparents were Sir Sitwell Sitwell, 3rd Baronet and his wife Louisa Lucy Hutchinson (daughter of the Hon. Henry Hely Hutchinson). His maternal grandparents were William Denison, 1st Earl of Londesborough and Lady Edith Somerset (a daughter of the 7th Duke of Beaufort), who claimed descent through female lines from the Plantagenets.

Sitwell was educated at Eton College. In World War I he served from 1916 in the British Army, in the Grenadier Guards. After the war he went to Balliol College, Oxford but did not complete a degree, and was heavily involved in Osbert and Edith's projects.

== Career ==
Sitwell's poetry collection A Hundred and One Harlequins attracted some attention in 1922, but the first works to gain more widespread notice and acclaim were three prose studies of painting, architecture and music: Southern Baroque Art (1924), German Baroque Art (1927) and Spanish Baroque Art (1931). Cyril Connolly called Southern Baroque Art "a milestone in the development of our modern sensibility". A series of books on music and musicians - including Mozart (1932), Liszt (1934) and shorter essays on Scarlatti, Offenbach and Tchaikovsky (Valse des Fleurs, 1941) - were also highly influential.

The Dance of the Quick and the Dead (1936) established a new strand of his work, evoking "outcast and vagabond societies; their music, their dress, their customs and rituals". This was the first of a series of lengthy autobiographical, travel and art-based "fantasias" that are among his most original works. Later examples include The Hunters and the Hunted (1947) and For Want of the Golden City (1973). Although most often associated with exotic art, culture and foreign travel, Sitwell also established himself as a connoisseur of English art and architecture, with the publication of British Architects and Craftsmen (1945, issued as a Pan paperback, 1960), concluded by his final publication, the anthology Sacheverell Sitwell's England (1986).

Poltergeists (1940) reviewed poltergeist cases over the centuries. Sitwell concluded that many, though not all, cases could be explained by human trickery (conscious or unconscious) and hysteria. Journey to the Ends of Time (1959), was "a kaleidoscopic series of meditations on death and the possibility of survival".

As his poetry was so severely criticised, particularly by those who disliked the Sitwells in general, and although Canons of Giant Art (1933, including the highly praised poem 'Agamemnon's Tomb') was a work of considerable impact, he refused to publish any of his poems for many years. Constant Lambert's setting of his early poem The Rio Grande for chorus and orchestra (taken from The Thirteenth Caesar, and other Poems, 1924) was first performed and broadcast in 1928 and has retained its popularity. In 1967 Derek Parker published a selection of his poems in the summer edition of Poetry Review, including 'Serenade to a Sister', an elegy for his sister Edith. An Indian Summer (1982), with a preface by Peter Quennell, collecting together 100 of his best most recent poems, was his final volume of poetry.

=== Later life ===
Sitwell was an early member of the New Party, a group established in 1931 by Oswald Mosley and containing former members of the major British political parties.

In his later life he withdrew from the publicity that attached to the Sitwells collectively, instead preferring to travel and concentrate on writing. He succeeded to the baronetcy on the death of his elder brother Osbert in 1969. He was made a Member of the Order of the Companions of Honour (CH) in 1984. His main residence was Weston Hall, Northamptonshire, the family home and he served as High Sheriff of Northamptonshire for 1948.

== Personal life ==
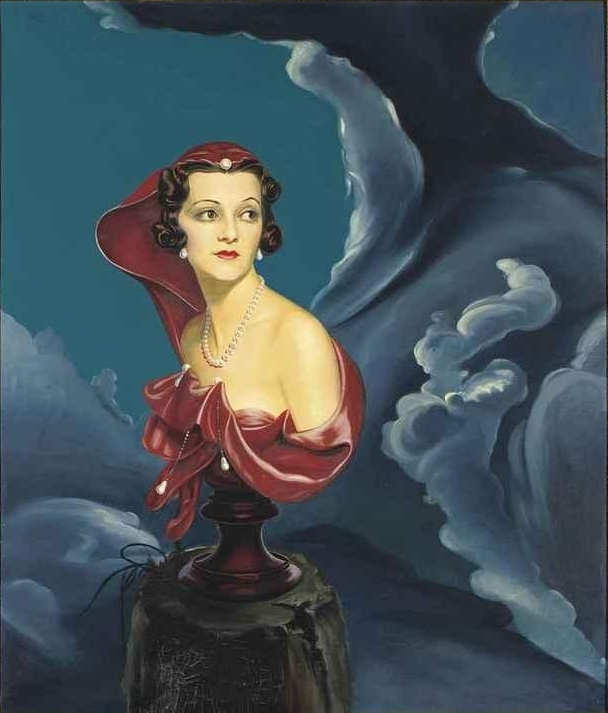
Georgia Doble Sitwell by William Acton (1906–1945)

On 12 October 1925 Sitwell married Georgia Doble, the daughter of Arthur Richard Doble, a wealthy Canadian banker. They had two sons:

- Sir Sacheverell Reresby Sitwell, 7th Baronet (1927–2009), who married Penelope Forbes, the daughter of Col. Hon. Donald Alexander Forbes (brother of the 8th Earl of Granard) and Mary Doreen Lawson (a daughter of Andrew Sherlock Lawson and granddaughter of the 14th Viscount Mountgarret), in 1952.
- Francis Trajan Sacheverell Sitwell (1935–2004), father of Sir George Sitwell, 8th Baronet. He was also a member of White's and St James's clubs.

Georgia Doble had difficulty adapting to married existence and missed the social life in London. Despite affairs on both sides, they remained deeply attached to each other until the end and never officially separated. The personal correspondence of Doble, preserved at the Harry Ransom Center at the University of Texas, include letters with David Stuart Horner and Frank Magro, Osbert Sitwell's partners, and friends like Lawrence Audrain, John Lehmann, Loelia Lindsay, René Massigli, Evelyn Waugh, and Mae West.

Sitwell died in October 1988 at the age of 90. He was succeeded in the baronetcy by his elder son Reresby.

== Works ==
- The People's Palace (1918; poems)
- The Hundred and One Harlequins (1922; poems)
- Southern Baroque Art: a Study of Painting, Architecture and Music in Italy and Spain of the 17th & 18th Centuries (1924)
- The Thirteenth Caesar (1924; poems; contains The Rio Grande, the basis of Constant Lambert's The Rio Grande)
- German Baroque Art (1927)
- The Cyder Feast (1927; poems)
- All at Sea: A Social Tragedy in Three Acts for First-Class Passengers Only (1927) with Osbert Sitwell
- The Gothick North: A Study of Mediaeval Life, Art, and Thought (1929)
- Dr. Donne and Gargantua (1930; poems)
- Spanish Baroque Art, with Buildings in Portugal, Mexico, and Other Colonies (1931)
- Mozart (1932)
- Canons of Giant Art: Twenty Torsos in Heroic Landscapes (1933; poems), containing "Agamemnon's Tomb"
- Liszt (1934)
- Conversation Pieces: a Survey of English Domestic Portraits and their Painters (1936)
- Dance of the Quick and the Dead (1936)
- Selected Poems (1936)
- La Vie Parisienne, a Tribute to Offenbach (1937)
- Narrative Pictures: a Survey of English Genre and its Painters (1938)
- German Baroque Sculpture (1938)
- Roumanian Journey (1938)
- The Romantic Ballet (1938; with C. W. Beaumont)
- Old Fashioned Flowers (1939)
- Poltergeists: An Introduction and Examination Followed By Chosen Instances (1940)
- Sacred and Profane Love (1940)
- Valse des Fleurs (1941; new limited edition (400 copies, 20 of which signed and accompanied by a Henry Moore lithograph) published by The Fairfax Press in 1980; new edition published by Eland in 2008)
- The Homing of the Winds: and other passages in prose. Faber & Faber, London (1942)
- Primitive Scenes and Festivals Faber & Faber, London (1942)
- Splendours and Miseries (1944)
- British Architects & Craftsmen: survey taste, design, styles 1600-1830 (1945)
- The Hunters and the Hunted (1948)
- Selected Poems (1948)
- The Netherlands; A Study of Some Aspects of Art, Costume and Social Life (1948, revised 1952)
- Tropical Birds (1948)
- Spain (1950)
- Cupid and the Jacaranda (1952)
- Fine Bird Books (1953) with Handasyde Buchanan and James Fisher
- Truffle Hunt with Sacheverell Sitwell (1953)
- Portugal and Madeira (1954)
- Denmark (1956)
- Arabesque & Honeycomb (1957)
- Journey to the Ends of Time, etc. (1959)
- The Bridge of the Brocade Sash: Travels and Observations in Japan (1959)
- Golden Wall and Mirador: Travels and Observations in Peru (1961)
- The Red Chapels of Banteai Srei:And Temples in Cambodia, India, Siam and Nepal (1962)
- Great Houses of Europe (1964)
- Monks, Nuns and Monasteries (1965)
- Southern Baroque Revisited (1967)
- Gothic Europe (1969)
- A Background for Domenico Scarlatti, 1685-1757: Written for His Two Hundred and Fiftieth Anniversary (1970)
- Tropicalia (1971; poems)
- For Want of the Golden City (1973)
- Battles of the Centaurs (1973)
- Les Troyens (1973)
- Look at Sowerby's English Mushrooms and Fungi (1974)
- A Notebook on My New Poems (1974)
- All Summer in a Day : An Autobiographical Fantasia (1976)
- Placebo (1977)
- An Indian Summer: 100 recent poems (1982; poems)
- Hortus Sitwellianus (1984) with Meriel Edmunds and George Reresby Sitwell
- Sacheverell Sitwell's England (1986) edited by Michael Raeburn

== Sources ==
- Sarah Bradford, Sacheverell Sitwell: Splendours and Miseries (1993)
- Derek Parker (ed.) Sacheverell Sitwell: A Symposium (1975)
- Thomas Balston, Sitwelliana 1915-1927 (1928)
- John Lehmann, A Nest of Tigers: The Sitwells in Their Times (1968)
- John Pearson, Facades: Edith, Osbert and Sacheverell Sitwell (1978)

Baronetage of the United Kingdom
Preceded by Osbert Sitwell	Baronet (of Renishaw, Derbyshire); 1969–1988	Succeeded by Reresby Sitwell
