= George Sitwell =

British antiquarian writer and Conservative politician

Sir George Reresby Sitwell, Bt
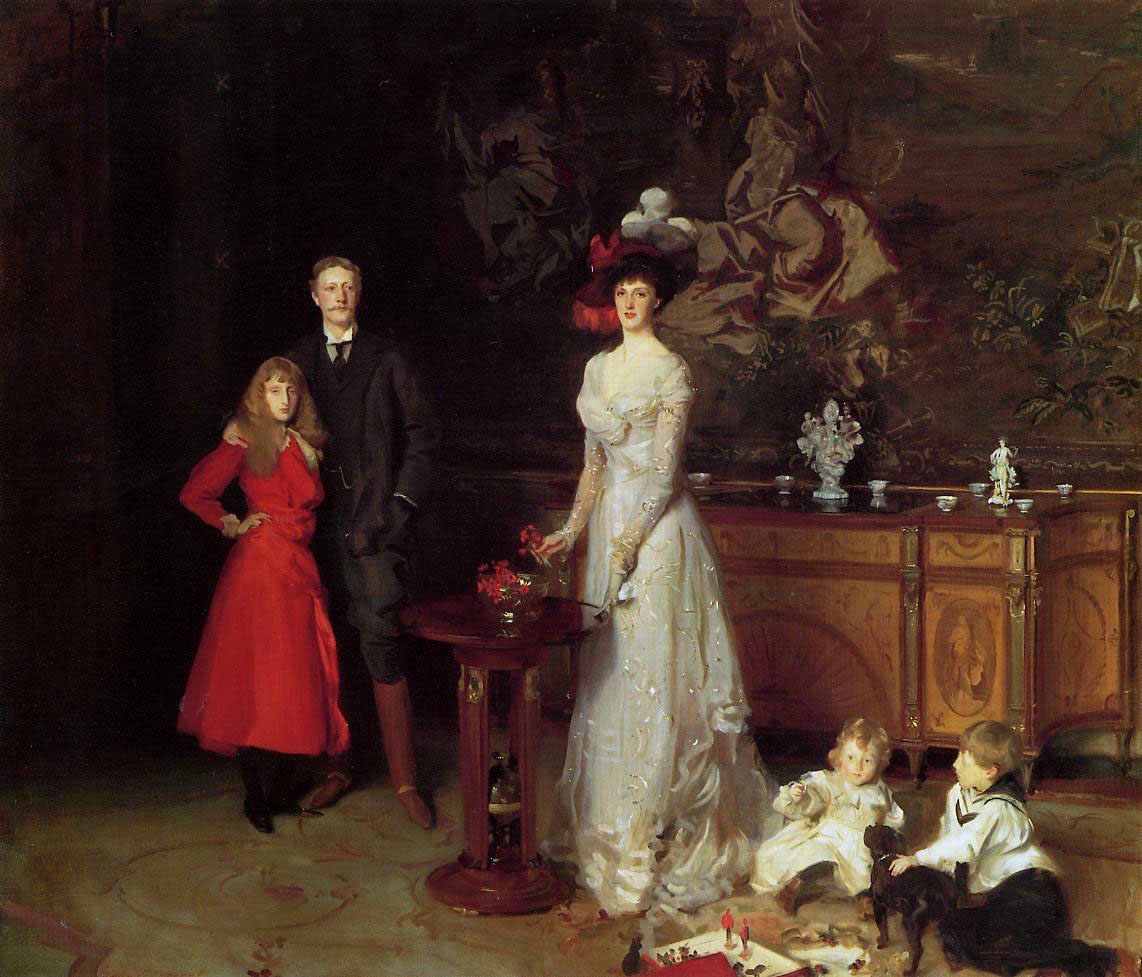
- The Sitwell Family by John Singer Sargent, 1900. From left: Edith Sitwell (1887–1964), Sir George Sitwell, Lady Ida, Sacheverell Sitwell (1897–1988), and Osbert Sitwell (1892–1969). Private Collection

Member of Parliament for Scarborough
- In office 1892–1895
- Preceded by: Joshua Rowntree
- Succeeded by: Joseph Compton-Rickett
- In office 1885–1886
- Preceded by: Richard Steble; William Sproston Caine
- Succeeded by: Joshua Rowntree

Personal details
- Born: George Reresby Sitwell; 27 January 1860 London, England
- Died: 9 July 1943 (aged 83) Locarno, Switzerland
- Spouse: Lady Ida Denison (m. 1886; died 1937)
- Children: Edith Sitwell; Osbert Sitwell; Sacheverell Sitwell
- Occupation: Writer, politician

Sir George Reresby Sitwell, 4th Baronet (27 January 1860 – 9 July 1943) was a British antiquarian writer and Conservative politician who sat in the House of Commons between 1885 and 1895.

== Early life ==
Sitwell was born in London, the son of Sir Sitwell Reresby Sitwell, 3rd Baronet and his wife Louisa Lucy Hutchinson, daughter of the Hon. Henry Hely Hutchinson. His father died in 1862 and he succeeded to the baronetcy at the age of two.

He was educated at Eton and Christ Church, Oxford.

== Career ==
Sitwell contested Scarborough seven times, losing twice in 1884. He was elected Member of Parliament for the constituency in 1885, but lost it in the following year. After regaining the seat at the 1892 general election, he lost it again in 1895.

Sitwell was a lieutenant in the West Yorkshire Yeoman Cavalry.

A keen antiquarian, Sitwell worked on the Sacheverell papers, and wrote a biography of his ancestor, William Sacheverell and published The Letters of the Sitwells and Sacheverells. His collection of books and papers is said to have filled seven sitting-rooms at the family house, Renishaw Hall, in Derbyshire. He researched genealogy and heraldry, and was a keen designer of gardens (he studied garden design in Italy).

In 1909 he purchased the Castle of Montegufoni, in Montespertoli near Florence, then a wreck inhabited by three hundred peasants. Over the next three decades he restored it to its original design, commissioned the Italian painter Gino Severini to paint the murals, and took up permanent residence there in 1925, writing to the Archbishop of Canterbury and the Chancellor of the Exchequer to explain that taxes had forced him to settle in Italy.

Sitwell was known for his eccentric behaviour. He banned electricity in his household well into the 1940s and made his guests use candles. He deliberately mislabelled his self-medication to stop anyone else using it. Sitwell lived on an exclusive diet of roasted chicken.

== Personal life ==
In 1886 Sitwell married Lady Ida Emily Augusta Denison, daughter of William Denison, 1st Earl of Londesborough and his wife Lady Edith Frances Wilhelmina Somerset (a daughter of 7th Duke of Beaufort). In 1915 he refused to pay off her many creditors and saw her prosecuted and imprisoned at Holloway for three months. She died in 1937. Together, they had three children:

- Dame Edith Louisa Sitwell DBE (1887–1964), who never married, but seems to have fallen in love with a number of unavailable men over the course of her life.
- Sir Francis Osbert Sacheverell Sitwell, 5th Baronet (1892–1969), who never married; he met David Stuart Horner in 1923, who was his lover and companion for most of his life.
- Sir Sacheverell Reresby Sitwell, 6th Baronet (1897–1988), who married Georgia Doble, the daughter of a wealthy Canadian banker, in 1925.

Sitwell remained in Italy at the outbreak of the Second World War, but moved to Switzerland in 1942. He died at Locarno in 1943 at the age of 83. He held his baronetcy for 81 years 89 days, longer than all his three predecessors, and one of the longest times anyone has held a baronetcy in England. He was succeeded in the baronetcy by his elder son Osbert, who described him vividly in his five-volume autobiography.

== In popular culture ==
John Gielgud portrayed George Sitwell in Tales My Father Taught Me, a 1990 radio adaptation of Osbert Sitwell's various memoirs, broadcast on BBC Radio 4 in 1990 and in January 2023 on BBC Radio 4 Extra.

Parliament of the United Kingdom
Preceded by Richard Steble and William Sproston Caine	Member of Parliament for Scarborough; 1885–1886	Succeeded by Joshua Rowntree
Preceded by Joshua Rowntree	Member of Parliament for Scarborough; 1892–1895	Succeeded by Joseph Compton-Rickett
Baronetage of the United Kingdom
Preceded by Sitwell Sitwell	Baronet (of Renishaw, Derbyshire); 1862–1943	Succeeded by Osbert Sitwell
