= Renishaw Hall =

Grade I listed historic house museum in North East Derbyshire, United Kingdom

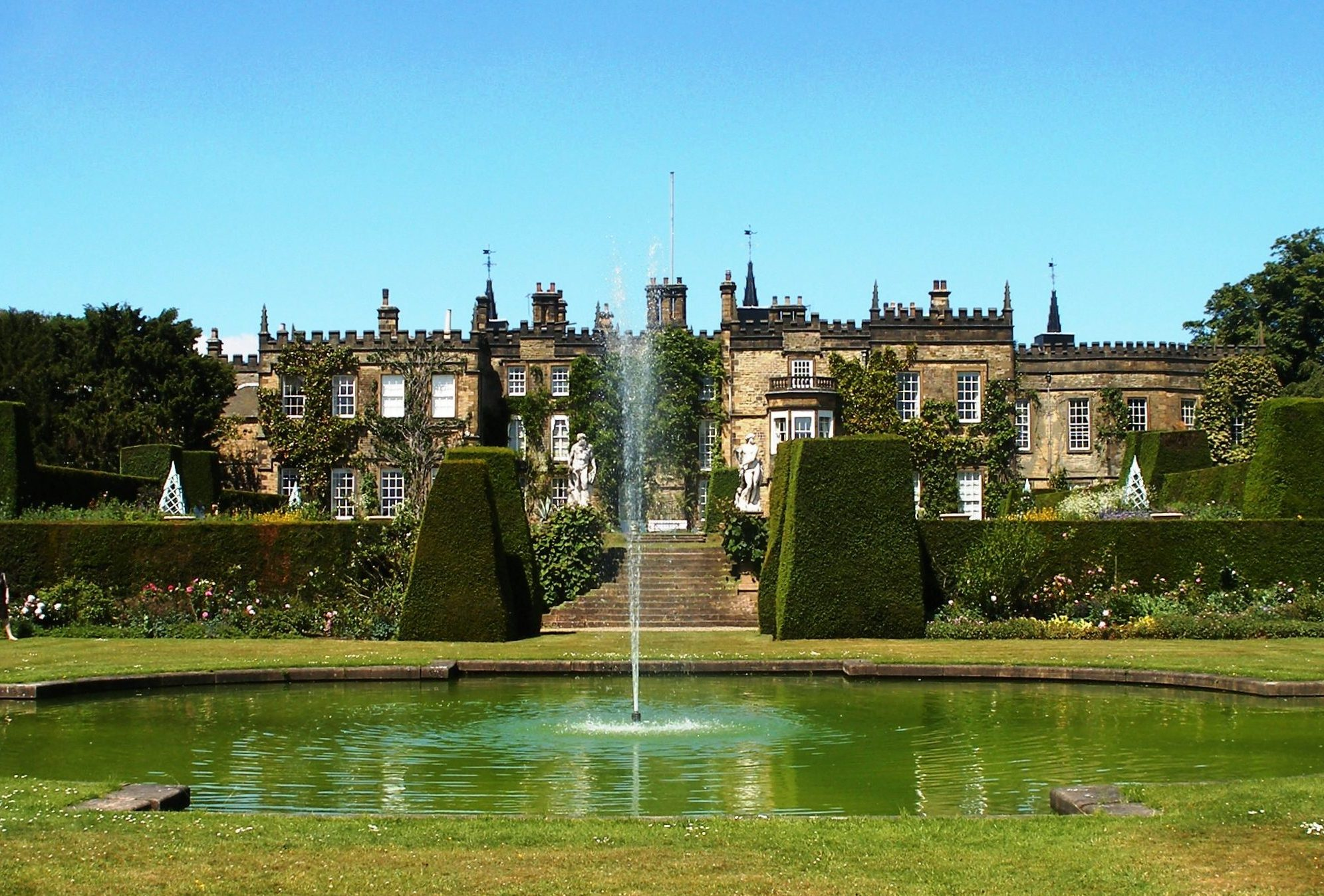
- Renishaw Hall and fountain

- Location within Derbyshire

General information
- Location: Renishaw, Derbyshire, England
- Coordinates: 53.30256°N 1.34722°W
- Completed: 1625
- Client: George Sitwell

Listed Building – Grade I
- Official name: Renishaw Hall
- Designated: 25 October 1951
- Reference no.: 1054857

National Register of Historic Parks and Gardens
- Official name: Renishaw Hall
- Designated: 4 August 1984
- Reference no.: 1000683

Renishaw Hall is a country house in Renishaw in the parish of Eckington in Derbyshire, England. It is a Grade I listed building and has been the home of the Sitwell family for nearly 400 years. The hall is southeast of Sheffield, and north of Renishaw village, which is northeast of Chesterfield.

== History ==
The house was built in 1625 by George Sitwell (1601–1667) who, in 1653, was High Sheriff of Derbyshire. The Sitwell fortune was made as colliery owners and ironmasters from the 17th to the 20th centuries.

Substantial alterations and the addition of the west and east ranges were made to the building for Sir Sitwell Sitwell by Joseph Badger of Sheffield between 1793 and 1808 and further alterations were made in 1908 by Sir Edwin Lutyens. Renishaw had two owners between 1862 (when Sir George Sitwell succeeded in his infancy) and 1965, when Sir Osbert Sitwell (brother of Edith) gave the house to his nephew, Sir Reresby Sitwell, 7th Baronet. The 7th Baronet was the eldest son of Sir Sacheverell Sitwell and owned the hall from 1965 until 2009 when he bequeathed it to his daughter, Alexandra Hayward.

== Architecture ==
The house was built in stages and has an irregular plan. It is constructed in ashlar and coursed rubble coal measures sandstone with crenellated parapets with pinnacles. It has pitched slate roofs.

== Gardens ==
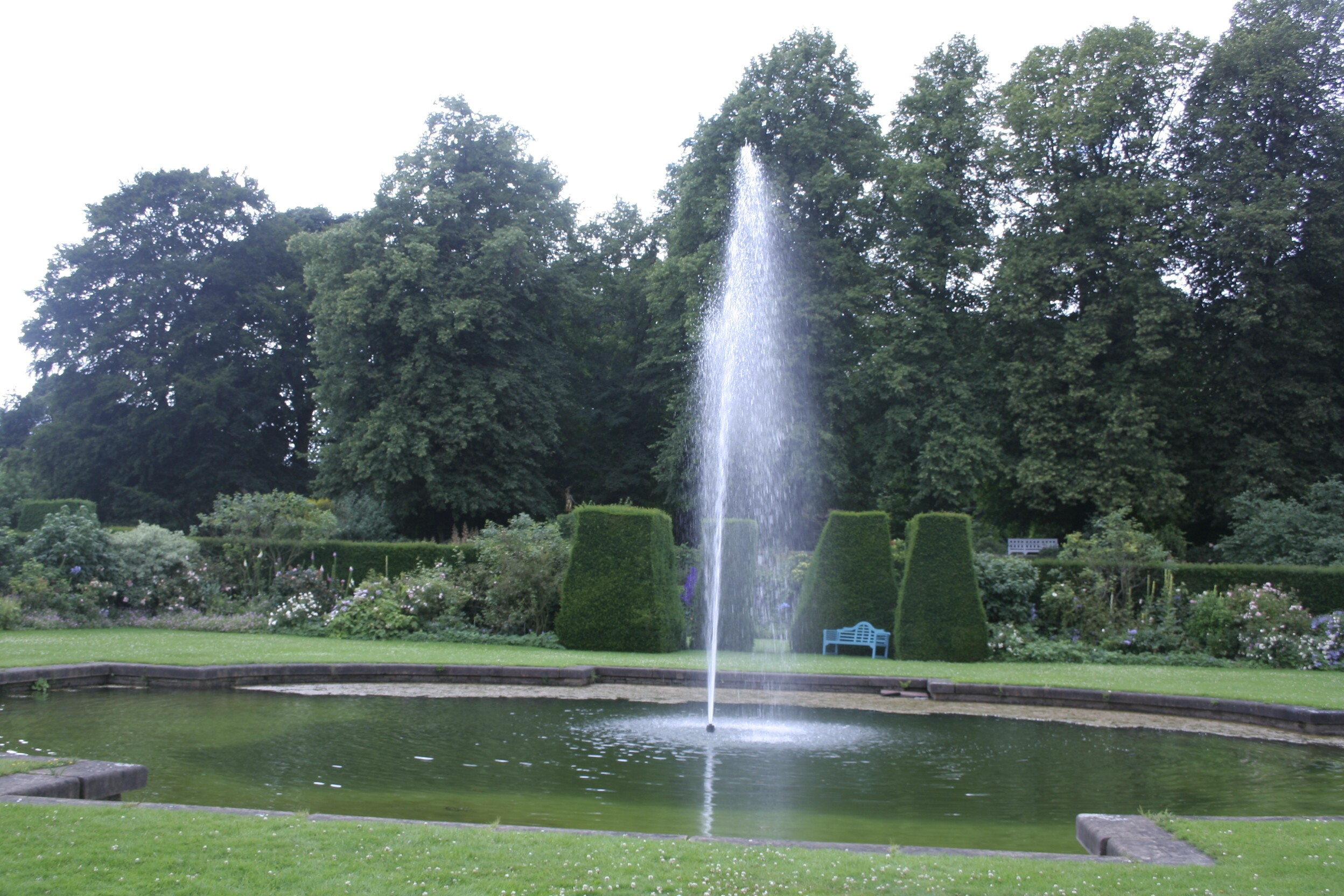

The gardens, including an Italianate garden laid out by Sir George Sitwell (1860–1943), are open to the public. The hall is open for groups by private arrangement. The park is listed in the Register of Parks and Gardens of Special Historic Interest in England as Grade II*.

== See also ==
- Grade I listed buildings in Derbyshire
- Listed buildings in Eckington, Derbyshire
