= Osbert Sitwell =

English writer (1892–1969)

Sir Osbert Sitwell Bt CH CBE
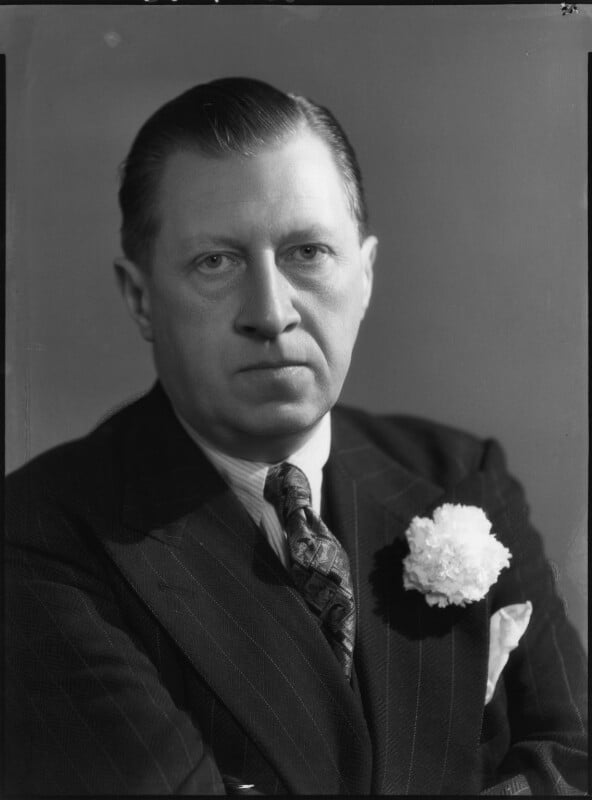
- Sitwell in 1939
- Born: Francis Osbert Sacheverell Sitwell; 6 December 1892; London, England
- Died: 4 May 1969 (aged 76) near Florence, Italy
- Education: Eton College
- Occupation: Writer
- Partner: David Stuart Horner
- Parent(s): Sir George Sitwell; Lady Ida Denison
- Relatives: Edith Sitwell (sister); Sacheverell Sitwell (brother)
- Writing career
- Period: 1919–1962

Sir Francis Osbert Sacheverell Sitwell, 5th Baronet CH CBE (6 December 1892 – 4 May 1969) was an English writer. His elder sister was Edith Sitwell and his younger brother was Sacheverell Sitwell. Like them, he devoted his life to art and literature.

== Early life ==
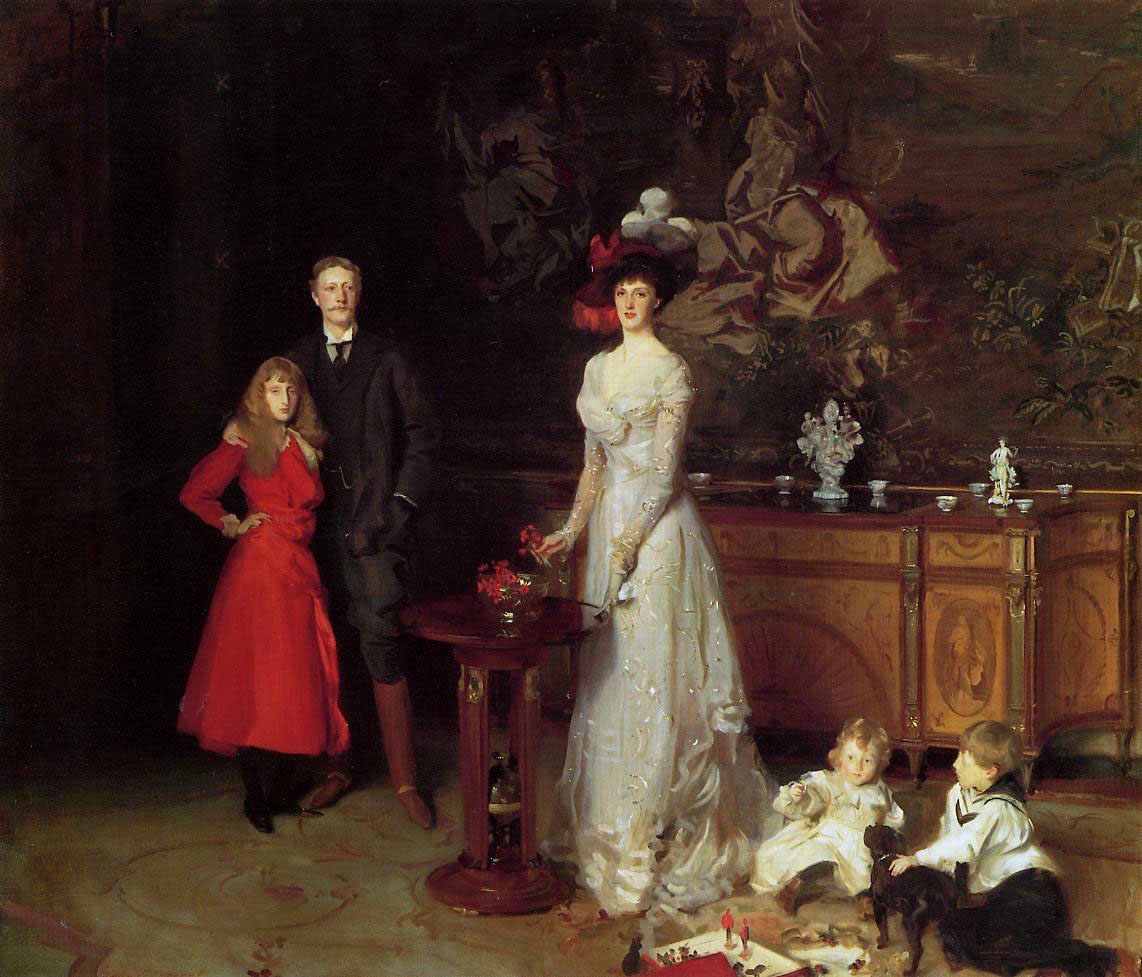
John Singer Sargent, The Sitwell Family, 1900. Private collection. From left: Edith Sitwell (1887–1964), Sir George Sitwell, Lady Ida, Sacheverell Sitwell (1897–1988), and Osbert Sitwell (1892–1969)

Sitwell was born on 6 December 1892 at 3 Arlington Street, St James's, London. His parents were Sir George Reresby Sitwell, fourth baronet, genealogist and antiquarian, and Lady Ida Emily Augusta (née Denison). He grew up in the family seat at Renishaw Hall, Derbyshire, and at family mansions in the region of Scarborough, and went to Ludgrove School, then Eton College from 1906 to 1909. For many years his entry in Who's Who contained the phrase "Educ[ated]: during the holidays from Eton."

In 1911 he joined the Sherwood Rangers Yeomanry but, not cut out to be a cavalry officer, transferred to the Grenadier Guards at the Tower of London from where, in his off-duty time, he could frequent theatres and art galleries.

=== Army ===
Late in 1914 Sitwell's civilised life was exchanged for the trenches of France near Ypres in Belgium. It was here that he wrote his first poetry, describing it as "Some instinct, and a combination of feelings not hitherto experienced united to drive me to paper". "Babel" was published in The Times on 11 May 1916. In the same year, he began literary collaborations and anthologies with his brother and sister, the trio being usually referred to simply as the Sitwells.

== Political and other activity ==
He acted as best man at the wedding of Alexander, 1st Marquess of Carisbrooke, son of Prince Henry of Battenberg and Princess Beatrice of the United Kingdom, on 19 July 1917 at the Chapel Royal, St. James's Palace, London.

In 1918 Sitwell left the Army with the rank of Captain, and contested the 1918 general election as the Liberal Party candidate for Scarborough and Whitby, finishing second.

General election 1918: Scarborough & Whitby
Party		Candidate	Votes	%	±%
C	Unionist	Gervase Beckett	11,764	56.6	n/a
	Liberal	Osbert Sitwell	7,994	38.5	n/a
	Labour	John Watson Rowntree	1,025	4.9	n/a
Majority			3,770	18.1	n/a
Turnout				60.1	n/a
	Unionist win				
C indicates candidate endorsed by the coalition government.

Sitwell was opposed to British intervention in the Russian Civil War. Sitwell wrote a 1919 poem ("A Certain Statesman"), satirizing Winston Churchill for his advocacy of British involvement in the conflict. Sitwell also wrote the poem "Shaking Hands With Murder" which was published in the Daily Herald newspaper in 1920; this poem derided Brigadier-General Reginald Dyer for ordering the Amritsar massacre.

Later he moved towards the political right, though politics were very seldom explicit in his writings. In Who's Who he ultimately declared of his political views: "Advocates compulsory Freedom everywhere, the suppression of Public Opinion in the interest of Free Speech, and the rationing of brains without which innovation there can be no true democracy."

Sitwell campaigned for the preservation of Georgian buildings and was responsible for saving Sutton Scarsdale Hall, now owned by English Heritage. He was an early and active member of the Georgian Group.

He also had an interest in the paranormal and joined the Ghost Club, which at the time was being relaunched as a dinner society dedicated to discussing paranormal occurrences and topics.

== Writing career ==
Sitwell devoted himself to poetry, art criticism and controversial journalism. Together with his brother, he sponsored a controversial exhibition of works by Matisse, Utrillo, Picasso and Modigliani. The composer William Walton also greatly benefited from his largesse (though the two men afterwards fell out) and Walton's cantata Belshazzar's Feast was written to Sitwell's libretto. He published three books of poems: Argonaut and Juggernaut (1919); At the House of Mrs Kinfoot (1921); and Out Of The Flame (1923).

=== Works ===
Sitwell's first work of fiction, Triple Fugue, was published in 1924, and visits to Italy and Germany produced Discursions on Travel, Art and Life (1925). His first novel, Before the Bombardment (1926), set in an out-of-season hotel, was well reviewed – Ralph Straus writing for Bystander magazine called it 'a nearly flawless piece of satirical writing', and Beverley Nichols praised 'the richness of its beauty and wit'. His subsequent novel The Man Who Lost Himself (1929) did not receive the same critical acclaim. However, for Osbert Sitwell it was an attempt to take further the techniques that he had experimented with in his début, and he ventured to explain this in one challenging sentence in his Preface when he said: "Convinced that movement is not in itself enough, that no particular action or sequence of actions is in itself of sufficient concern to dare lay claim to the intelligent attention of the reader, that adventures of the mind and soul are more interesting, because more mysterious, than those of the body, and yet that, on the other hand, the essence does not reside to any much greater degree in the tangle of reason, unreason, and previous history, in which each action, event and thought is founded, but is to be discovered, rather, in that balance, so difficult to achieve, which lies between them, he has attempted to write a book which might best be described as a Novel of Reasoned Action". Re-edited over three quarters of a century after its initial publication, The Man Who Lost Himself has found new popularity as an idiosyncratic mystery novel.

Sitwell went on to write several further novels, including Miracle on Sinai (1934) and Those Were the Days (1937) neither of which received the same glowing reviews as his first. A collection of short stories Open the Door (1940), his fifth novel A Place of One's Own (1940), his Selected Poems (1943) and a book of essays Sing High, Sing Low (1944) were reasonably well received. His "The Four Continents" (1951) is a book of travel, reminiscence and observation.

=== Rat Week ===
Sitwell was a close friend of the Duke and Duchess of York, future King George VI and Queen Elizabeth. In December 1936, when the abdication of King Edward VIII was announced, he wrote a poem, Rat Week, attacking principally the former king and Wallis Simpson but also those friends of Edward who deserted him when his alliance with Simpson became common knowledge in England. Because of its libellous content it was not published but Sitwell ensured that it was circulated privately. In February 1937, a version appeared in Cavalcade, which Sitwell described as a "paper, which confounded liveliness with mischief". The Cavalcade version omitted the "offensive" references to Edward and Wallis. This resulted in the poem's gaining an unwarranted reputation as being sympathetic to the Windsors over the way some of their friends had treated them. Cavalcade also missed out a verse in which a number of the "rats" were named explicitly, as to publish this would have been libellous.

Sitwell sued Cavalcade for breach of copyright. He obtained an interim injunction preventing further publication in Cavalcade, which ensured further surreptitious circulation of the poem. When the full case came to court, Cavalcade tried to get Sitwell to produce the missing verse. Sitwell resisted on the grounds that he could not be forced to make a criminally libellous statement. The case ended up in the Appeal Court, where Sitwell won and obtained damages and costs.

Sitwell knew that, because of the libel issue, the poem could not be published in his lifetime; he decided that publication should wait even longer than that to avoid "pain to those still living". The poem was first published posthumously in 1986, the year the Duchess of Windsor (as Wallis had become) died, in a book entitled Rat Week: An Essay on the Abdication. Sitwell then explained the background to the poem in some detail because he recognised that the long delay in publication would result in many readers being unfamiliar with the characters. The book also contains a foreword by John Pearson, explaining some of the background to the publication of the book.

=== Autobiography ===
In 1943 he started an autobiography that ran to four volumes: Left Hand, Right Hand! (1943), The Scarlet Tree (1946), Great Morning (1947) and Laughter in the Next Room (1949). The first volume includes a chapter on "The Sargent Group" a humorous account of John Singer Sargent's group portrait of the Sitwells (Sitwell family), and the adjustments that Sargent made to Edith's and her father's noses.

Writing in The Adelphi, George Orwell declared that, "although the range they cover is narrow, [they] must be among the best autobiographies of our time." Sitwell's autobiography was followed by a collection of essays about various people he had known, Noble Essences: A Book of Characters (1950), and a postscript, Tales my Father Taught Me (1962).

The sometimes acidic diarist James Agate commented on Sitwell after a drinking session on 3 June 1932, in Ego, volume 1, "There is something self-satisfied and having-to-do-with-the-Bourbons about him which is annoying, though there is also something of the crowned-head consciousness which is disarming."

In Who's Who, he summed up his career: "For the past 30 years has conducted, in conjunction with his brother and sister, a series of skirmishes and hand-to-hand battles against the Philistine. Though outnumbered, has occasionally succeeded in denting the line, though not without damage to himself."

== Baronetcy and honours ==
After Sitwell's father died, in 1943, Osbert succeeded to the baronetcy.

Sitwell was made a Commander of the Order of the British Empire (CBE) in 1956 and a Member of the Order of the Companions of Honour (CH) in 1958.

== Personal life ==
In 1923, Sitwell met David Stuart Horner (1900 – 1983) who was his lover and companion for most of his life.

== Death ==
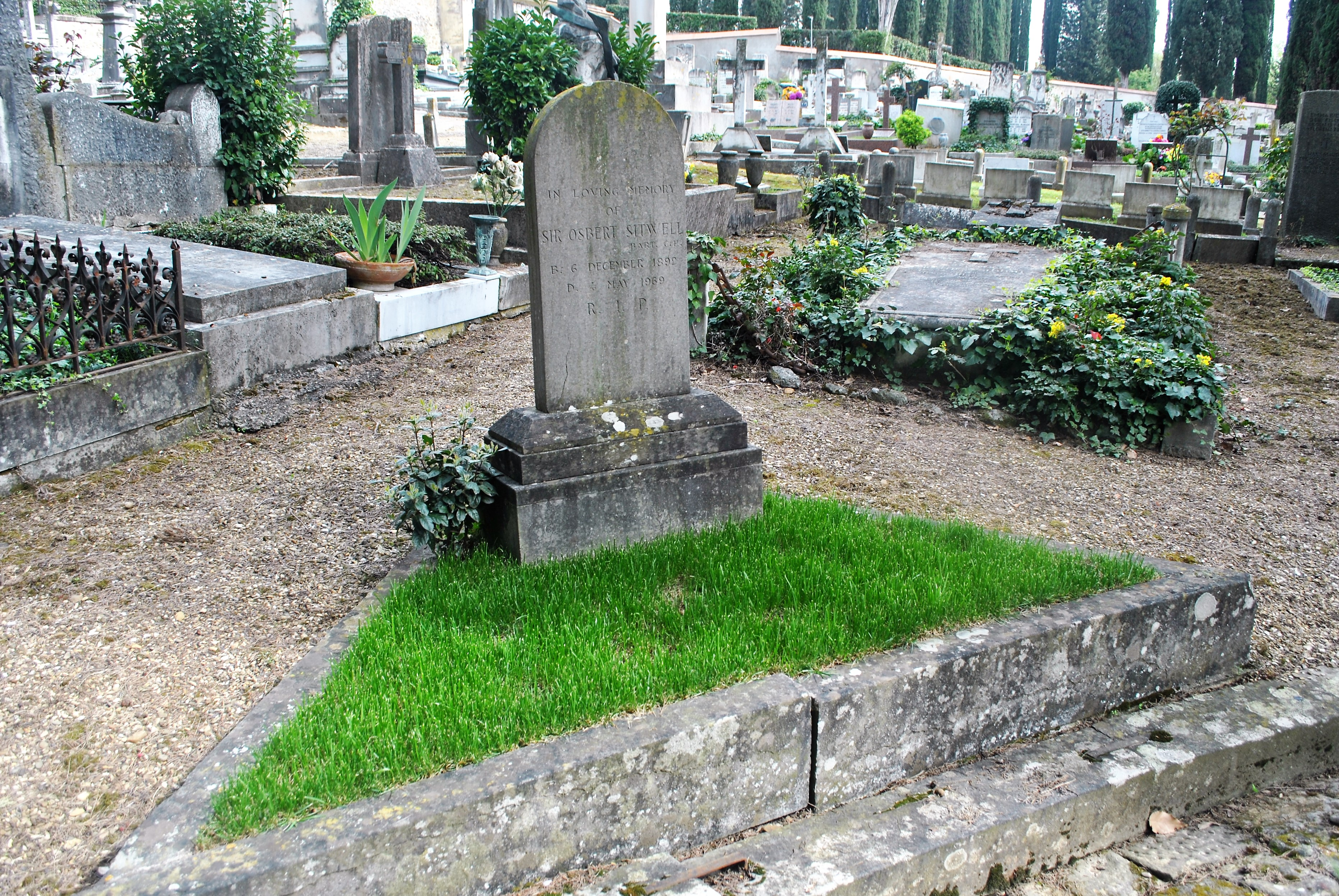
Sitwell's headstone in the Cimitero degli Allori, Firenze, Italy

Sitwell suffered from Parkinson's disease from 1950; by the mid-1960s his condition had become so severe that he had to abandon writing. He spent his last years in Italy, at the Castle of Montegufoni, in Montespertoli near Florence, which his father had bought derelict and restored as his personal residence; he died there on 4 May 1969.

The castle was left to his nephew, Reresby; his money was left to his brother Sacheverell. Sitwell was cremated and his ashes buried in the Cimitero Evangelico degli Allori in Florence, together with a copy of his first novel, Before the Bombardment.

== Select bibliography ==
- Triple Fugue (stories) (1924)
- Discursions on Travel, Art and Life (essays) (1925)
- Before the Bombardment (novel) (1926)
- The Man Who Lost Himself (novel) (1929)
- Dumb-Animal and Other Stories (1930)
- Collected Poems and Satires (1931)
- Winters of Content, More Discursions on Travel, Art and Life (1932)
- Dickens (1932)
- Miracles on Sinaï (novel) (1934)
- Penny Foolish: A Book of Tirades and Panegyrics (1935)
- Those Were the Days (novel) (1937)
- Escape With Me! An Oriental Sketch-Book (travels, China) (1939)
- A Place of One's Own (novel) (1940)
- Two Generations (1940)
- Selected Poems (1943)
- Left Hand! Right Hand! (autobiography, vol. 1) (1944)
- Sing High, Sing Low (essays) (1944)
- The Scarlet Tree (autobiography, vol. 2) (1946)
- Great Morning (autobiography, vol. 3) (1947)
- Laughter in the Next Room (autobiography, vol. 4) (1948)
- Four Songs of the Italian Earth (1948)
- The Death of a God and Other Stories (1949)
- Noble Essences (autobiography, vol. 5) (1950)
- Wrack at Tidesend (poetry) (1954)
- Tales My Father Taught Me (1962) (adapted for radio in 1990)
- Pound Wise (final complete work) (1963)
- Rat Week: An Essay on the Abdication (posthumously published) (1986)

Baronetage of the United Kingdom
Preceded by George Sitwell	Baronet (of Renishaw, Derbyshire); 1943–1969	Succeeded by Sacheverell Sitwell
