= Edith Sitwell =

British poet and critic (1887–1964)

Dame Edith Sitwell DBE
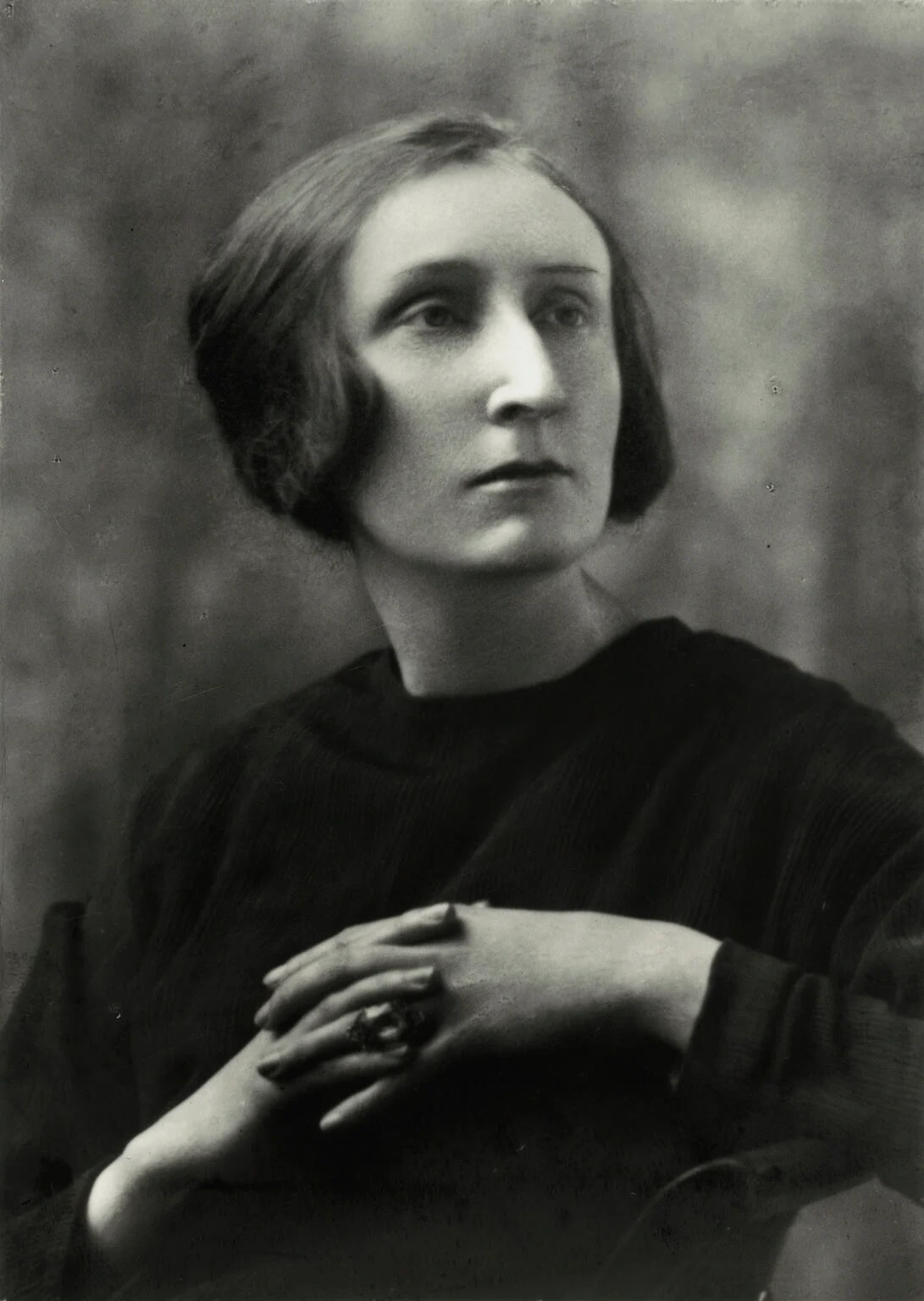
- Sitwell in 1929, by Elliott & Fry
- Born: Edith Louisa Sitwell; 7 September 1887; Scarborough, North Riding of Yorkshire, England
- Died: 9 December 1964 (aged 77); London, England
- Occupation: Poet
- Parent(s): George Sitwell; Lady Ida Denison
- Relatives: Osbert Sitwell and Sacheverell Sitwell (brothers)

Dame Edith Louisa Sitwell (7 September 1887 – 9 December 1964) was a British poet and critic and the eldest of the three literary Sitwells. She reacted badly to her eccentric, unloving parents and lived much of her life with her governess. She never married but became passionately attached to Russian painter Pavel Tchelitchew, and her home was always open to London's poetic circle, to whom she was generous and helpful.

Sitwell published poetry continuously from 1913, some of it abstract and set to music. With her dramatic style and exotic costumes, she was sometimes labelled a poseur, but her work was praised for its solid technique and painstaking craftsmanship. She was a recipient of the Benson Medal of the Royal Society of Literature.

== Early life ==
Edith Louisa Sitwell was born in Scarborough, North Riding of Yorkshire, the oldest child and only daughter of Sir George Sitwell, 4th Baronet, of Renishaw Hall; he was an expert on genealogy and landscaping. Her mother was Lady Ida Emily Augusta (née Denison), a daughter of William Denison, 1st Earl of Londesborough and a granddaughter of Henry Somerset, 7th Duke of Beaufort through whom she was descended from the Plantagenets in the female line.

Sitwell had two younger brothers, Osbert (1892–1969) and Sacheverell (1897–1988), both distinguished authors, well-known literary figures in their own right, and long-term collaborators. She described her childhood as "extremely unhappy" and said her mother had "terrible rages" while she rarely saw her father. Her relationship with her parents was stormy at best, not least because her father made her undertake a "cure" for her supposed spinal deformation, involving locking her into an iron frame. She wrote in her autobiography that her parents had always been strangers to her.

Whilst in Scarborough the Sitwell family lived in Wood End, a marine villa bought by Lady Louisa Sitwell in 1879 to which she added a double height conservatory filled with tropical plants and birds which Edith mentioned in her autobiography. Although Edith's relationship with Scarborough was not always a happy one, references to the seaside environment often occur in her work, particularly Facade.

== Adult life ==
In 1914, 26-year-old Sitwell moved to a small, shabby flat in Pembridge Mansions, Bayswater, which she shared with Helen Rootham (1875–1938), her governess since 1903.

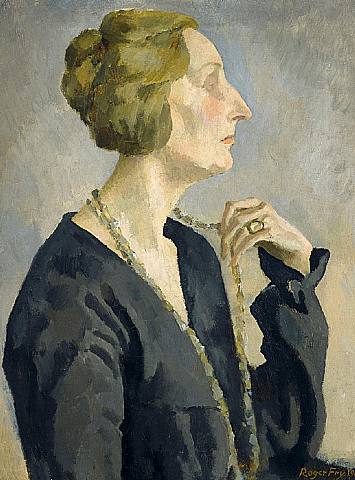
Portrait of Edith Sitwell, by Roger Fry, 1918

Sitwell never married, but seems to have fallen in love with a number of unavailable men over the course of her life. Around 1914, she developed a passion for the Chilean artist and boxer Álvaro de Guevara, whom her biographer Richard Greene describes as "thuggish". Violent, unstable and addicted to opium, Guevara eventually became involved with the poet and socialite Nancy Cunard, whom Sitwell subsequently "never lost an opportunity to speak ill of".

She met the poet Siegfried Sassoon in 1918 and the two became close friends. Sassoon, who was homosexual, cared deeply for Sitwell, but Greene asserts that she fell in love with him, becoming jealous of his lover Stephen Tennant in the late 1920s. Sassoon and Sitwell were often seen out in each other's company, leading Sassoon's friend and mentor, the critic Edmund Gosse, to suggest that they marry. According to Sassoon's biographer, Max Egremont, Sassoon quickly replied: "I don't think poets should marry one another." Throughout the 1920s and '30s, Sitwell relied on Sassoon for criticism of her work, both privately and publicly. In 1922, he wrote a glowing review of Façade in the Daily Herald entitled "Too Fantastic for Fat-Heads", in which he compared Sitwell to the artist Aubrey Beardsley and declared: "Aubrey Beardsley has triumphed over all the fat-heads of his day. Miss Sitwell will do the same." Writing to him in 1933, Sitwell told him: "you are the only person who has ever done anything at all for my poetry."

In 1927, Sitwell fell in love with the gay Russian painter Pavel Tchelitchew. They developed a close friendship, with Sitwell regularly helping him financially and publicising his work. However, she was often hurt by his unpredictable temper and seeming lack of appreciation for her efforts on his behalf, and Greene suggests that Tchelitchew "toyed with her expectations" of romance when he wanted something from her, growing more distant again when he got what he wanted. Nevertheless, the relationship lasted until his death 30 years later. In 1928, Helen Rootham had surgery for cancer; she eventually became an invalid. In 1932, Rootham and Sitwell moved to Paris, where they lived with Rootham's younger sister, Evelyn Wiel.

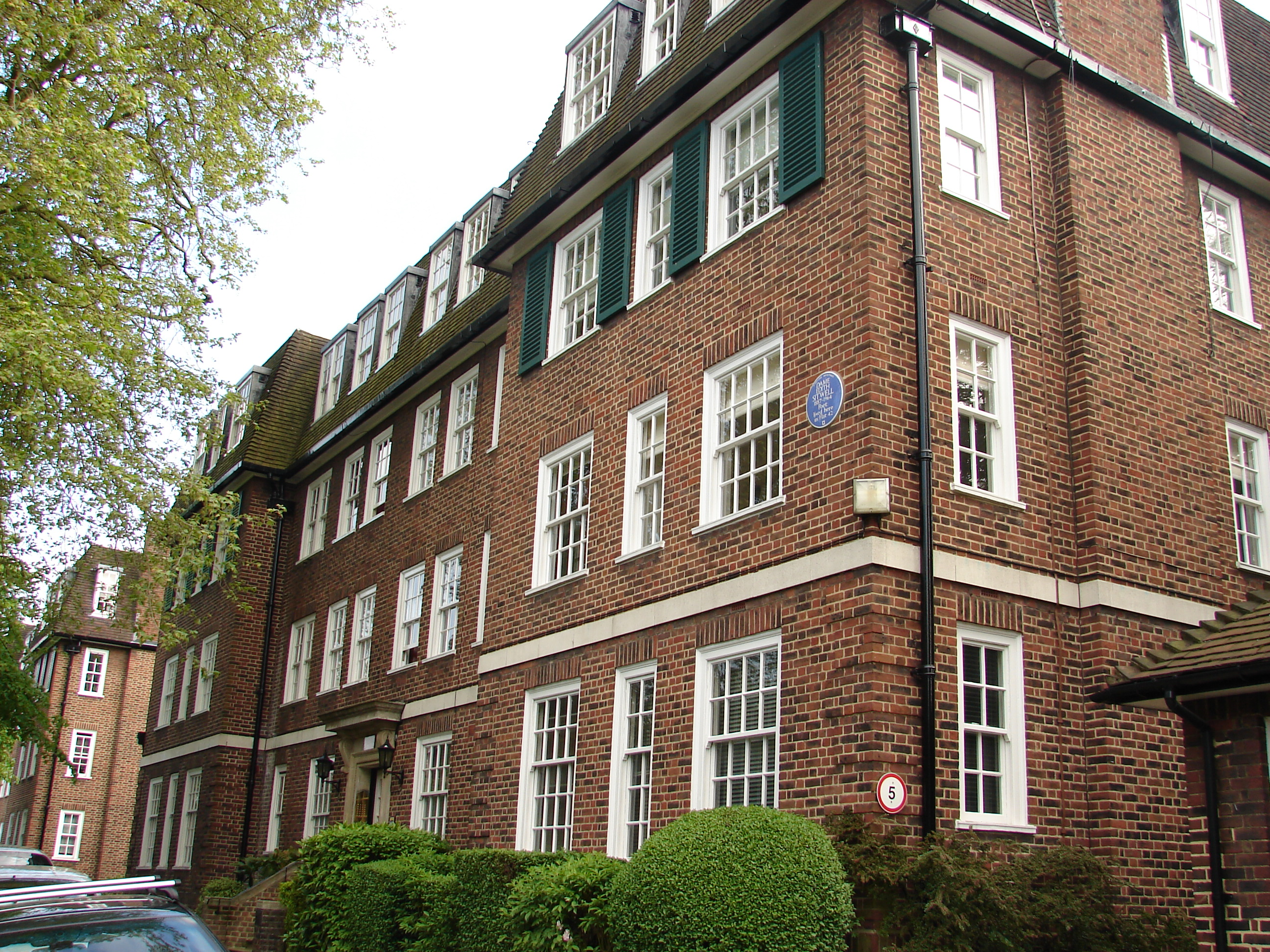
Greenhill, Hampstead. Sitwell lived here at flat 42 1961–64

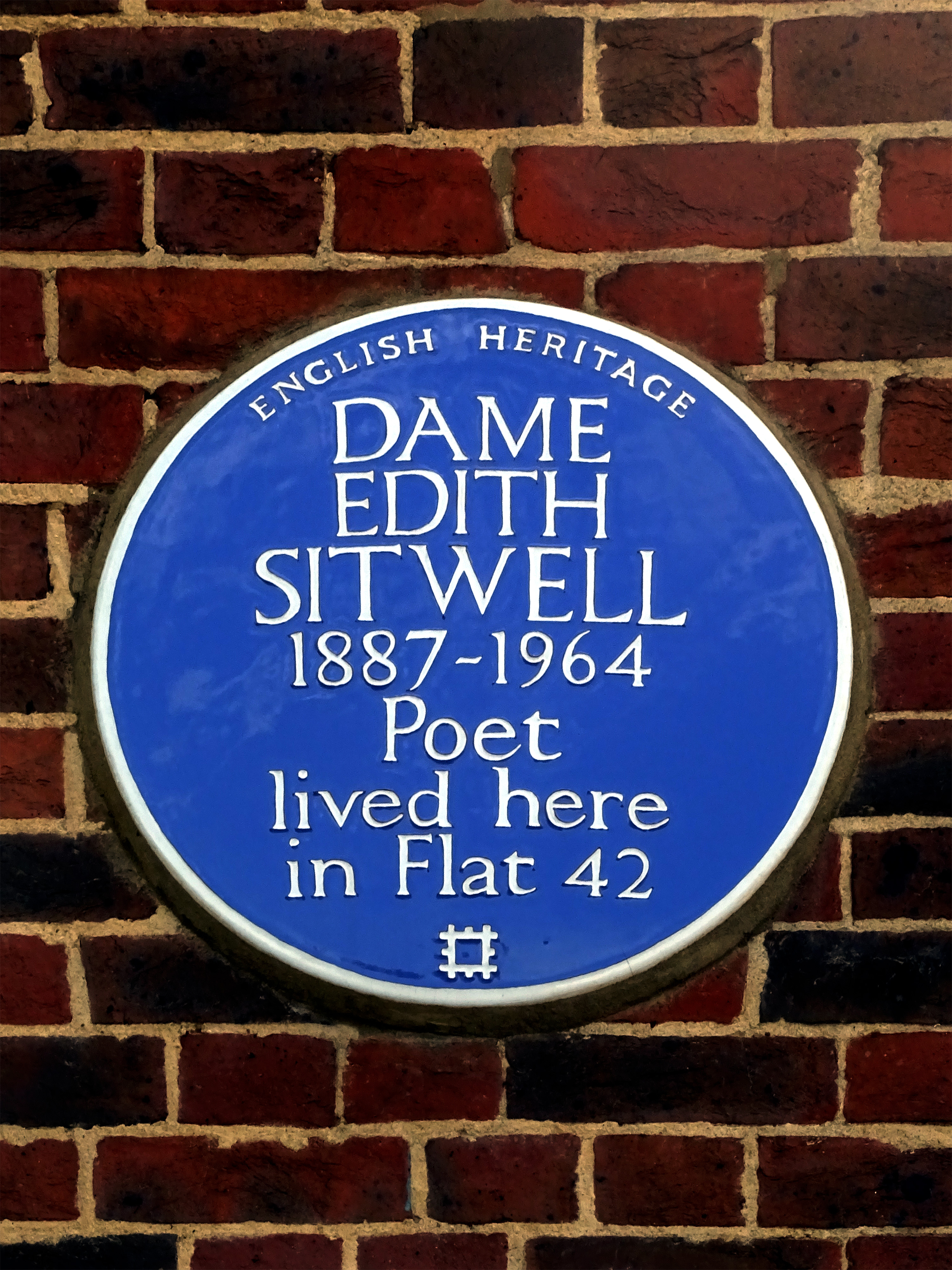
Blue plaque, Greenhill flats, Hampstead

In 1930, Sitwell published a study of the poet Alexander Pope, in which she argued for Pope's greatness and identified him as a precursor of Romanticism. George Orwell, reviewing the book in the New Adelphi, noted Sitwell's fixation on the "texture" of Pope's work, which he argued distracted her from his sometimes hackneyed sentiments, but praised "her warm-hearted defence of the poet against all his detractors".

Sitwell's mother died in 1937. Sitwell did not attend the funeral because of her displeasure with her parents during her childhood. Helen Rootham died of spinal cancer in 1938. During the Second World War, Sitwell returned from France and retired to the family home at Renishaw Hall with her brother Osbert and his lover, David Horner. She wrote under the light of oil lamps as the house had no electricity. She knitted clothes for their friends who served in the army. One of the beneficiaries was Alec Guinness, who received a pair of seaboot stockings.

The poems she wrote during the war brought her back before the public. They include Street Songs (1942), The Song of the Cold (1945), and The Shadow of Cain (1947), all of which were much praised. "Still Falls the Rain", about the London Blitz, remains perhaps her best-known poem; it was set to music by Benjamin Britten as Canticle III: Still Falls the Rain. Her poem The Bee-Keeper was set to music by Priaulx Rainier, as The Bee Oracles (1970), a setting for tenor, flute, oboe, violin, cello, and harpsichord. It was premiered by Peter Pears in 1970. Poems from The Canticle of the Rose were set by composer Joseph Phibbs in a song-cycle for high soprano with string quartet premiered in 2005.

In 1943, her father died in Switzerland, his wealth depleted. In 1948, a reunion with Tchelitchew, whom she had not seen since before the war, went badly. In 1948 Sitwell toured the United States with her brothers, reciting her poetry and, notoriously, giving a reading of Lady Macbeth's sleepwalking scene. Her poetry recitals always were occasions; she made recordings of her poems, including two recordings of Façade, the first with Constant Lambert as co-narrator, and the second with Peter Pears.

Tchelitchew died in July 1957. Her brother Osbert died in 1969, of Parkinson's disease, diagnosed in 1950. Sitwell became a Dame Commander of the Order of the British Empire (DBE) in 1954. In August 1955, she converted to Roman Catholicism and asked author Evelyn Waugh to serve as her godfather.

Sitwell wrote two books about Queen Elizabeth I of England: Fanfare for Elizabeth (1946) and The Queens and the Hive (1962). She always claimed that she wrote prose simply for money and both these books were extremely successful, as were her English Eccentrics (1933) and Victoria of England (1936).

Sitwell was the subject of This Is Your Life in November 1962, when she was surprised by Eamonn Andrews on the stage of the BBC Television Theatre in London.

From 1961 until shortly before her death, Sitwell lived in a flat in Hampstead in London, which is now marked with an English Heritage blue plaque.

== Last years and death ==
In about 1957, Sitwell began using a wheelchair, after lifelong joint problems. In 1959, Sitwell was interviewed by John Freeman, about her life and work, on the BBC television series Face to Face. Sitwell was one of only two women to be interviewed during this first iteration of the series, the other being French actress Simone Signoret.

Her last poetry reading was in 1962. In the following year she was awarded the title of Companion of Literature by the Royal Society of Literature (the first woman to be so honoured). She died at St Thomas' Hospital, Lambeth, London, on 9 December 1964 at the age of 77. She is buried in the churchyard of the parish church of Saints Mary and Peter in Weedon Lois, Northamptonshire.

Sitwell's papers are held at the Harry Ransom Center at The University of Texas at Austin.

== Poetry ==
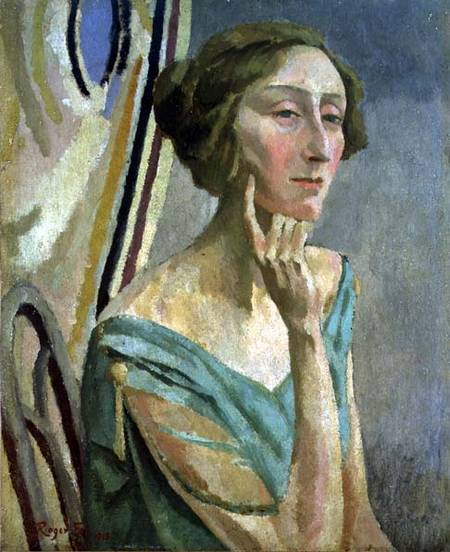
Portrait of Sitwell by Roger Fry, 1915

Sitwell published her first poem The Drowned Suns in the Daily Mirror in 1913, and between 1916 and 1921 she edited Wheels, an annual poetic anthology compiled with her brothers—a literary collaboration generally called "the Sitwells".

In 1929, she published Gold Coast Customs, a poem about the artificiality of human behaviour and the barbarism that lies beneath the surface. The poem was written in the rhythms of the tom-tom and of jazz, and shows considerable technical skill. Her early work reflects the strong influence of the French symbolists.

She became a proponent and supporter of innovative trends in English poetry and opposed what she considered the conventionality of many contemporary backward-looking poets. Her flat became a meeting place for young writers whom she wished to befriend and help: these later included Dylan Thomas and Denton Welch. One of her editors at Duckworth Books was Anthony Powell, who dedicated his novel What's Become of Waring to her. She also helped to publish the poetry of Wilfred Owen after his death.

Sitwell's only novel, I Live Under a Black Sun, based on the life of Jonathan Swift, was published in 1937.

== Publicity and controversy ==
Sitwell had angular features, and stood six feet tall. She often dressed in gowns of brocade or velvet, wearing gold turbans and many rings; her jewellery is now in the jewellery galleries of the Victoria and Albert Museum in London. Her unusual appearance provoked critics almost as much as her verse, and she was the subject of virulent personal attacks from Geoffrey Grigson, F. R. Leavis, and others. Grigson, in his magazine New Verse, repeatedly ridiculed Sitwell, calling her "the Old Jane." She gave as good as she got, describing Leavis as "a tiresome, whining, pettyfogging little pipsqueak".

Sitwell treated her enemies with scorn. Noël Coward wrote a skit on her and her two brothers as "the Swiss Family Whittlebot" for his 1923 revue London Calling!, and although she wrote accepting an apology from him in 1926, she refused to speak to him until they were reconciled after her 70th birthday party at London's Royal Festival Hall. Sitwell participated in the UGH.... correspondence featured in the Times Literary Supplement in 1963, an ongoing debate on the value of the work of William S. Burroughs and the nature of literary criticism, initiated by critic John Willard. Sitwell stated that she was delighted by Willard's wholly negative review of Burroughs' work, despite claiming not to know who Burroughs was. In the same letter, she described Lady Chatterley's Lover as an "insignificant, dirty little book", and rounded out her letter with the statement that she preferred Chanel No. 5 to having her nose "nailed to other people's lavatories".

Sitwell explored the distinction between poetry and music in Façade (1922), a series of abstract poems set to music by William Walton. Façade was performed behind a curtain with a hole in the mouth of a face painted by John Piper; the words were recited through the hole with the aid of a megaphone. The public received the first performance with bemusement. Critic Julian Symons attacked Sitwell in The London Magazine of November 1964, accusing her of "wearing other people's bleeding hearts on her own safe sleeve."

== Publications ==
=== Poetry collections ===
Sitwell's poetry collections are:

- Mother and Other Poems (1915)
- Clowns' Houses (1918)
- The Wooden Pegasus (1920)
- Façade (1922)
- Bucolic Comedies (1923)
- The Sleeping Beauty (1924)
- Troy Park (1925)
- Rustic Elegies (1927)
- Gold Coast Customs (1929)
- Collected Poems (1930)
- Five Variations on a Theme (1933)
- Poems New and Old (London: Faber & Faber, 1940)
- Street Songs (1942)
- Green Song and Other Poems (1944)
- The Song of the Cold (1945)
- The Shadow of Cain (1947)
- The Canticle of the Rose: Selected Poems 1920–1947 (1949)
- Façade, and Other Poems 1920–1935 (1950)
- Gardeners and Astronomers: New Poems (1953)
- Collected Poems (1954)
- The Outcasts (1962)

=== Other books ===
- Alexander Pope (1930)
- Bath (1932), a profile of the city under Beau Nash.
- The English Eccentrics (1933)
- Aspects of Modern Poetry (1934)
- Victoria of England (1936)
- I Live Under a Black Sun (1937)
- English Women (1942)
- A Poet's Notebook (1943)
- Fanfare for Elizabeth (1946), a biography of Elizabeth I.
- A Book of the Winter (1950) An anthology compiled by Edith Sitwell. It includes some works by her and her brothers.
- A Book of Flowers (1952) compiled by Edith Sitwell.
- The Queens and the Hive (1962), a biography of Elizabeth I.
- Taken Care Of (1965), autobiography.
