= Council for Educational Technology =

Former educational administration

The Council for Educational Technology (originally called the National Council for Educational Technology (NCET) but reformed as the Council for Educational Technology (CET) in 1972) was set up in 1967 by the Department of Education and Science in the UK. Initially it consisted of a large council of experts with a small administrative team whose purpose was to "advise educational services and industrial training organisations on the use of audio visual aids and media" but it quickly became more than this, developing projects, producing an academic journal BJET and advising government on setting up major computer aided learning programmes (NDPCAL and MEP). It was amalgamated with the Microelectronics Education Support Unit (MESU) in 1989 to form the National Council for Educational Technology (NCET which later was renamed the British Educational and Communication Technology Agency (Becta) in 1997).

== Formation ==
The original Council (NCET) consisted of a chairman appointed by the Secretary of State for Education and Science after consultation with the Secretary of State for Scotland, 31 members appointed by the former and 4 members appointed by the latter. In addition, assessors from eight government departments and educational bodies attended meetings. In 1973, as a result of the recommendations of the Hudson Working Party the council was a representative body, consisting of 59 people.

== Directors ==
=== Professor Tony Becher 1967–1969 ===
Tony Becher was the first Director appointed from the Nuffield Foundation

=== Geoffrey Hubbard 1969–1986 ===
Geoffrey Hubbard was appointed as Director in June 1969. He was previously an engineer and then a civil servant at the Ministry of Technology. He successfully steered the Council through its sometimes difficult relationship with government. He retired in 1986 but continued his role as Chairman of the National Extension College.

=== Richard Fothergill 1987–1988 ===
Richard Fothergill was appointed Director following his role as Director of the Microelectronics Education Programme.

== The British Journal of Educational Technology ==
The British Journal of Educational Technology (BJET) was sponsored and funded by the council. It published its first issue in January 1970 and Professor Norman Mackenzie was its first editor and the prime mover behind its creation. Although sponsored by the Council it always kept a strong, peer-reviewed, academic approach to its work – as it said in its "Auspices" at the front of each volume.

Whilst the British Journal of Educational Technology is supported by the Council for Educational Technology for the United Kingdom, it nevertheless reflects an independent, and not official view, of developments or opinions on educational technology.

BJET continued through the decades and is now published by Blackwell and continues to publish academic articles on educational technology. Importantly its back numbers chronicle much of the history of educational technology in the UK and elsewhere.

== Developing NDPCAL ==
During the late 1960s computers were beginning to make an impact on education and John Duke, the council's newly appointed assistant Director proposed a major initiative in computer-based learning. The Council set up a Working Party to investigate the potential role of the computer and to outline a programme of research and development. Following a feasibility study the Council set out the case for a 5-year programme in 'computer-based learning' in 1969. The Government, following much discussion amongst the interested departments and an intervening general election, announced the approval of Mrs Thatcher, Secretary of State for Education and Science to a 'National Development Programme in Computer Aided Learning' in a DES press release dated 23 May 1972.

== Developing MEP ==
During the late 1970s, with the rapid rise in the use of microelectronics, the Prime Minister Jim Callaghan, is reported to have asked each government department to draw up an action plan to meet the challenge of new technologies and the DES asked CET to create plans for a new programme – the Microelectronics Education Programme. The Programme was aimed at primary and secondary schools in England, Northern Ireland and Wales. Although it was delayed by the change of government in 1979, Keith Joseph as Education Secretary finally approved it in 1980 and in March a four-year programme for schools, costing £9 million.

== Publications ==
As well as BJET CET published a range of publications, many the result of projects it set up and funded. The following is a selection of these publications to give a flavour of the breadth and range of the council's activity:

- 1972 Educational Technology: The Development, Application and Evaluation of Systems, Techniques and Aids to Improve the Process of Human Learning
- 1974 Copyright and education: a guide to the use of copyright material in educational institutions
- 1978 Deciding to Individualize Learning: A Study of the Process, Malcolm L. MacKenzie
- 1980 How to write a distance learning course, Roger Lewis and Glyn Jones
- 1981 The Kingdom of Sand: Essays to Salute a World in Process of Being Born, William Gosling
- 1984 Open Learning in Action: Case Studies, Roger Lewis
- 1986 The Magic of the Micro: a resource for children with learning difficulties, Mary Hope
