= London Grid for Learning =

British educational technology company

- Formation: 2001
- Founders: Paul Robinson, Brian Durrant, John Jackson
- Type: Charitable trust
- Registration no.: 1090412
- Headquarters: 9th Floor, 10 Exchange Square, EC2A 2BR
- Services: Broadband, Filtering, Safeguarding, Cybersecurity
- CEO: John Jackson
- Chairman: Paul Robinson
- Revenue: £35,599,000
- Staff: 41
- Website: www.lgfl.net

The London Grid for Learning commonly referred to as LGfL is a British not for profit technology company with headquarters in central London. The charity founded in 2001 procures, develops and delivers technology and educational content including broadband connections, filtering and safeguarding services, devices and software and licences. LGfL started in London but is now a nationwide organisation winning multiple awards such as ERA Education Supplier of the Year (not for profit).

In 2023 LGfL acquired 14,000 kilometres of fibre and in 2024 joined the London Internet Exchange (LINX) to become a fully fledged internet service provider.

== Objectives ==
LGfL was founded in 2001 to advance education in particular by providing and assisting in the provision of information and communications to London schools for the benefit of the children attending those schools. LGfL's remit has been extended following approval by the Charity Commission for England and Wales in August 2022:

1. to advance education, in particular, by providing and assisting in the provision of information and communications technology (including broadband) for the benefit of children attending schools; and
2. to advance health by assisting in the provision of broadband and other communications technology to encourage the better integration of services between local authorities and the national health service in the provision of adult social and other care; and
3. to advance community development by assisting local authorities to integrate services through broadband and other communications technology to provide services more efficiently and at lower cost to the recipients of services particularly the elderly, vulnerable individuals and the disabled.

The Trust aims to realise these objectives by:

- energising teaching and learning through LGfL's content portfolio
- keeping schools and children safe online
- tackling educational inequality through its resources for children with disabilities and special educational needs
- promoting well-being
- protecting and securing schools
- saving schools money

Today around 1.3 million children and 250,000 teachers across thousands of UK schools and public sector bodies are served by the Trust.

== History ==
LGfL's origins can be traced to the late 1990s when local authorities in London combined to access government grants to provide broadband and digital services for schools.

LGfL's initial purpose was to leverage purchasing power in the provision of broadband and related digital services for all member schools. By aggregating the procurement of infrastructure, e-learning platforms and educational content, London education authorities had by 2010 accrued savings in excess of £390m, compared to the cost of securing those services individually.

LGfL was one of 8 local authority led consortiums formed across the country in the late 1990s to access government grants with the aim of providing every school with broadband as part of the National Grid for Learning. It was part of the government's Broadband in Schools Programme, a five-year project with the aim of providing every school with broadband by 2006.

The London consortium was driven by the Association of London Chief Education Officers (subsequently the Association of London Directors of Children's Services) with both Havering and Hackney councils playing a part in the early planning. Paul Robinson, the then Director of Education for the Wandsworth Borough Council became Chairman of the LGfL Consortium. Brian Durrant was appointed as CEO. John Jackson was seconded from Camden Council to lead on Technology Strategy.

Though a local authority led approach proved useful in the early planning stages by 2000 it became clear that a corporate body in the form of a charitable trust would better serve the children and schools in London and in particular the roll out of the broadband and digital services. The Trust was therefore created in 2001 with the appointment to the Board of Trustees mainly with a mix of local authority, educational and technological experience.

In April 2001, LGfL created a special purpose entity named the London Grid for Learning Trust with the purpose of enabling LEAs to act jointly in the procurement of services and letting of contracts.

A ten-year contract to supply broadband connection to all schools worth £40m was awarded to Equinox Converged Solutions. To fund the project, Chief Executive Brian Durrant announced that surplus bandwidth would be sold off to other organisations, including non-educational ones.

The project combining broadband and content for London schools was officially unveiled in an event hosted by Digitalbrain PLC, LGFL's portal partner, at London's IMAX cinema in June 2001, and the network went live for the first 350 schools on 1 September 2001. At the time it was the fourth largest metropolitan area network in the world.

Dennis Stevenson, who had outlined a vision the use of IT in schools in his 1997 report 'Connecting the Learning Society', described the launch of the LGfL as a 'defining moment' in realising that dream.

The initial strategic goal of LGfL of connecting every member school was achieved in 2005, thus fully meeting Tony Blair's challenge of 'every school on broadband' a year early.

=== London Schools Admissions Service ===
In July 2006, the computerised Pan London Co-ordinated Schools Admissions Scheme, which helped thousands of parents and pupils find the secondary school of their choice, was merged with the online London e-Admissions Project to form the new London Schools Admissions Service within the London Grid for Learning. The new online admissions service for both secondary and primary school pupils allowed parents to apply online, increasing peace of mind as an instant email confirmation was sent upon receiving an application, and minimising the possibility of an error as information provided was quickly validated.

The London Admissions service has subsequently expanded to include reception age children and several Home Counties.

=== London Grid Limited ===
In 2007 LGfL set up a trading company (London Grid Limited) to provide connectivity and services to Local Authorities including the provision of internet connectivity for Councils across London.

== Services ==
=== LGfL 1.0 Network ===
Location of three main cores in Greater London

The original network laid in 2000 across the 2,600 schools, colleges and libraries was designed and delivered by Equinox Converged Solutions.

Instead of a distributed 'star' system of connections, Equinox proposed the use of two central 'core' locations and a series of nodal loops – running across a combination of 100 Mbit/s and 1 Gbit/s devices – providing broadband access at every connection point. It used dual 9.6 Gbit/s Ethernet fibre connections between hubs in Park Royal and Earl's Court.

A third 'core' was set up in London's Docklands area to provide a local switching point for the eastern LEAs. Ten million metres of fibreoptic cable were laid to create the core rings of the network.

=== Transition to LGfL 2.0 ===
In 2011, the contract with Equinox ended and LGfL agreed a deal with Virgin Media. Virgin replaced the old legacy network with a new 40 Gbit/s network known as LGfL 2.0. The new deal reduced the cost of a 100 Mbit/s connection to just a third of the former price tag.

On 31 March 2011, after the ten-year contract with the 2,600 schools ended, institutions were free to negotiate IT contracts individually. It was reported that over 1,000 schools signed up to LGfL 2.0 shortly afterwards. By 2014 over 2,000 schools across London had been connected to LGfL 2.0

=== Trustnet ===
In January 2011, following the end of the ten-year broadband deal with Equinox, LGfL signed a contract with Virgin Media. In 2014, LGfL extended its deal with Virgin for £1 billion, with the new contract expected to run until 2028.

As part of the new contract with Virgin Media LGfL launched a national service for schools and Multi Academy Trusts called Trustnet.

=== Free School Meals Eligibility Checker ===
In 2014 LGfL commissioned the development of a Free School Meals Checker to enable parents and carers to claim free school meals for their children, and schools to confirm eligibility for Pupil Premiums.

The service proved popular and potential claims exceeded £40M a year by 2023 providing additional resources for schools, particularly in areas of social and economic deprivation. Peak claims came during the COVID pandemic at over £50M per annum reflecting the hardship and difficulties families were facing during the pandemic.

However, controversy erupted in October 2015 after it emerged that LGfL's spam filtering system had blocked marketing emails from a competitor. LGfL advised that these emails had been automatically flagged as junk mail, however this was disputed by the competing firm.

The competitor also stated that they believed unfair pressure had been applied to encourage schools to remain with LGfL. LGfL subsequently wrote to schools apologising for having conveyed this impression.

== Strategy changes ==
In 2016 John Jackson was appointed as CEO and focused on intensifying LGfL's "value-added" approach, bundling a wide range of additional services, product licences and content alongside Internet access. By contrast, many other service providers focus on connectivity and compete primarily on price for this core service.

=== Transition to the National Grid for Learning (NGfL) ===
LGfL acquired the National Grid for Learning (NGfL) trademark in 2017 to reflect the expansion of its services across England, and support its long-term ambition to have more schools connecting from outside of London than its historical base in the capital trademarked SuperCloud to underpin its future service offering to schools and MATs.

=== SuperCloud ===
LGfL trademarked SuperCloud to reflect its changing technology strategy to schools and MATs which was to focus on deploying cloud native platforms and Software as Service (SaaS) solutions that were capable of servicing any of its connected schools in the UK and, in future, potentially around the world.

=== LGfL and COVID 19 ===
LGfL launched a national procurement for laptops during COVID-19 as part of an initiative called BridgeTheDivide which resulted in over 200,000 new and refurbished laptops being delivered to schools during the pandemic.

During COVID-19, the Department for Education (DfE) awarded a contract to train and support teachers across England to harness remote learning and make use of cloud platforms from Google and Microsoft. An estimated 100,000 teachers and educators benefitted from the initiative.

To enable the move to remote learning and cloud platforms LGfL, working in partnership with Virgin Media, more than doubled the bandwidth available to schools and offered a free filtering solution to schools (HomeProtect) which at its peak was protecting an estimated 250,000 children working remotely.

== Recent developments (2023-) ==
=== Ownership of a National Fibre Network ===
In 2023 LGfL purchased 14,000 kilometres of fibre from Virgin Media O2 to enable delivery of very high speed connectivity to schools over the following 15 years to meet rising demand for bandwidth driven by the migration to cloud services and the increased consumption of media rich content. By owning its own fibre LGfL was also in a position to control costs and therefore shield schools from volatile pricing and rental movements in the broadband market and its supply chain.

LGfL's acquisition of a national fibre network was approved through a Statutory Instrument by Parliament following approval by the Department for Levelling Up, Housing and Communities. The subsequent addition of LGfL, as a charitable body, to the Central Register was the first of its kind.

=== Resilient Broadband ===
In the same year LGfL awarded a contract worth up to £30M to Community Fibre to enable the delivery of resilient fibre connections to schools as copper was deemed inadequate for modern school networks.

=== Satellite Network ===
LGfL has trademarked LGfL SkyNet to support the rollout of satellite connections to schools which has proven cost effective for rural areas and coastal towns poorly served by broadband in England.

=== Cybersecurity ===
In response to increasing cyberattacks in Education, LGfL expanded its cybersecurity services and partnered with the National Cyber Security Centre to undertake a UK wide audit of the state of security in schools in 2019 and 2022. The research findings indicated that many schools lacked Disaster Recovery Plans and were ill-prepared to respond to security breaches.

To assist Schools, LGfL developed the Elevate toolkit which provides template policies, response plans and risk registers free of charge to schools as part of its charitable mission.

=== Safeguarding ===
LGfL has worked closely with a range of agencies including the Department for Education, Local Authorities and charitable organisations to tackle extremism and support multi agency co-ordination to protect children. LGfL and the DfE jointly developed a Prevent Duty Self-Assessment Tool for schools.

LGfL contributed to the development of DfE Guidance on Keeping Children Safe in Education (KCSIE) and on Tackling Extremism. The implementation of the guidance places new requirements for safeguarding on schools and this has driven technology innovation in schools and fundamental changes in school approaches to safeguarding. To meet the needs of schools LGfL now processes more than 13 billion web access requests a day to ensure schools comply with DfE requirements.

LGfL has conducted research with schools and other agencies on the challenges presented by on line safety. LGfL's research indicated that there were serious risks to children on line and that abuse on social media was widespread. LGfL's research also found that there was significant risk of criminals recruiting young and vulnerable children by buying them food and gifts in local burger bars and take aways, known as Chicken Shop Grooming.

== Governance ==
The Trust is a charitable company limited by guarantee, and all 33 London Councils collectively own and share in its governance. The executive board of trustees is composed of representative directors of children's services and local authority officers responsible for the implementation of ICT in schools.

Local authorities are closely engaged in the work of the LGfL through regular meetings attended by representatives from all member authorities. The various decisions and activities undertaken by the Trust are guided by the work of nine groups made up of representatives from the LEAs, most notably the executive, editorial and E-safety board, and the technical steering group.

The day-to-day operation of the company is the responsibility of the Chief Executive who is accountable to the executive board and other boards.

The inaugural Chief Executive of LGfL was Brian Durrant, who in July 2015 announced he would retire the following year and was succeeded as CEO by John Jackson.

== See also ==
- Regional Broadband Consortium
- East of England Broadband Consortium
- WMnet
- National Grid for Learning
- C2k
- East of England Broadband Network
- Glow (Scottish Schools National Intranet)
- Hwb (Digital Learning for Wales)
