= Minnis =

Minnis may refer to:

- Ewell Minnis, a village and civil parish
- Rhodes Minnis, a village and civil parish
- Stelling Minnis, a village and civil parish

One of several people with the surname Minnis:

- Alastair Minnis (b. 1948), British academic
- Arnold Minnis (1891–1972) English cricketer and military officer
- Chelsey Minnis (b. 1970), American poet
- Helen Minnis, Scottish psychiatrist
- Hubert Minnis (b. 1954), Bahamian politician
- Jack Minnis (footballer) (1922–1975), Australian rules footballer
- Jack Minnis (1926–2005), American civil rights activist
- John Minnis (b. 1953), American politician
- Joseph Minnis (1904–1977), American bishop
- Karen Minnis (b. 1954), American politician
- Michael Minnis, American writer
- Snoop Minnis (b. 1977), American football player
- Tony Minnis, American tennis coach
- William Minnis (b. 1902), Irish chess master
