= Ralph Tabberer =

British educationalist

Ralph Edwin Tabberer CB (born 5 August 1954 in Romford) was the Director General of Schools in the UK government department, the Department for Children, Schools and Families. He held the position from March 2006 until March 2009.

== Early life ==
He attended Plymouth College and then Gonville and Caius College, Cambridge University, gaining a MA in Economics, Social and Political Science in 1976. He gained a PGCE from Brunel University in 1977.

== Career ==
Tabberer worked as a teacher in Hillingdon LEA, then in research and in government IT programmes, including MEP and MESU, before moving into education administration in 1989.

He worked for almost 10 years at the National Foundation for Educational Research. He first joined the Department for Education and Skills (DfES, later renamed the DCSF) in 1997 where he worked with Professor Sir Michael Barber in the School Effectiveness Unit. He was Head of the National Grid for Learning from 1999 to 2000. From February 2000 – March 2006, he was Chief Executive of the TTA (Teacher Training Agency), which became the TDA (Training and Development Agency for Schools) in March 2005. His leadership coincided with a very successful period in teacher recruitment and teacher training, as the government turned round historically low performance.

Tabberer left his position as Director General of Schools at the DCSF some months after the death of his wife, Helen. To nurse her, he had partly left in May 2008, being replaced by Jon Coles. He became Chief Schools Officer and Chief Operating Officer at GEMS Education, the worldwide education conglomerate headquartered in Dubai, in March 2009. In January 2012, he left to set up his own series of businesses, under the collective name of BBD Education. He sold BBD Education in 2022, but has retained his UK businesses and continues in a full-time role in International Education.

== Recognition ==
In the 2009 New Years Honours, he was honoured by The Queen with the award of a Companion of the Most Honourable Order of the Bath (CB).

He was awarded an Honorary Degree from the University of East London in 2000 and he is a visiting professor at both the University of London Institute of Education and the University of Warwick.

== Personal life ==
He has a daughter, named Holly, and a son, Joseph. He has three stepsons and two stepdaughters by his previous marriage. When in England, he has lived in Farnham, Southwell and now in Royal Leamington Spa.
