= HWB =

HWB may refer to:

- Hwb, a Welsh education website
- HWB color model, a representation of points in an RGB color model
- Hardware write block device, a type of computer hard disk controller
- Hawaii Winter Baseball, a defunct professional baseball league
- Health and wellbeing board, various statutory bodies in England
- Heavy Water Board, of India's Department of Atomic Energy
- Helmert–Wolf blocking, a statistical algorithm
- Hochwohlgeboren, an honorific in Europe
- Homeopaths Without Borders, a pseudoscientific nonprofit organization
- Hybrid wing body, a type of fixed-wing aircraft
- Herbert Walker Bush
