= Regional Broadband Consortium =

The Regional Broadband Consortia was created in the United Kingdom in 2000 to secure lower prices for broadband connection services for schools by aggregating demand across a region and entering into region wide contracts. They were established under the auspices of what was then known as the Department for Education and Skills (DfES) National Grid for Learning (NGfL) programme.

== 2 Mbit/s ==
The Regional Broadband Consortia collectively subscribed to a 2 Mbit/s standard for broadband, for which the origins in the 1990s are unclear. It is not the case, as has been often alleged, that the RBCs created or imposed this standard on English schools, though they were active in reinforcing and publicizing the standard. Though it did not appear clearly stated in the NGfL funding guidance until 2003, this standard had been inherited from various fore-running projects including the People's Library Network. 2 Mbit/s was possibly selected with a view to encouraging the use of optical fiber to the site.

Despite frequent challenges, particularly from the telecommunications industry and the dominant national carrier, which held a monopoly outside the urban areas, the RBCs managed to defend the 2 Mbit/s standard against much cheaper emerging ADSL alternatives. Some providers were describing offerings as low as 150 kbit/s as broadband. When the lower relative costs of these highly contended products were taken into account, e.g. £360 per annum rather than £3,600, it was extremely difficult to persuade many educationalists and even many in the IT industry of the advantages of constantly available uncontended high-bandwidth.

== History of the RBCs ==
In 1999, around one hundred and fifty upper tier English councils responsible for providing a schools' education service were provided with small sums of money (about £150,000 per region) to submit bids to create regional consortia in order to implement a schools broadband connectivity programme. In the first wave, local authorities in eight regions were deemed to have submitted successful bids and granted a share of a total of £35 million of funding in 2000. There were two successful submissions in the North West, one from Cumbria and Lancashire and another from the majority of unitary authorities in the south of that region. Bids from the North-East, from Yorkshire and the Humber, from the East Midlands, East of England, South-East and South Western regions were also accepted. Unsuccessful bids were submitted by the West Midlands local authorities, by councils in the London area and those in the Bristol area.

By a process for which the responsibility is unclear, seven councils that were not participants in successful bids were also funded. Thus was born a principle of 'opting out'. There were three of these in the North West, three in Yorkshire and Humber and one, Oxfordshire, in the South. Had the fourteen in the West Midlands, the thirty-three in London and the half-dozen in the Bristol area been made aware of this back door procedure for obtaining funding there is little doubt that they too would have opted out of the DfES official process.

In the following year (2001), this funding approach was abandoned and all council education services received broadband grants as an element of their NGfL earmarked grant for ICT. So in 2001 new RBCs came into being in the West Midlands WMnet and London (LGfL), while the Bristol area councils joined South Western Grid. Participation in RBCs was strongly encouraged by the stipulation of the funding arrangements that the council's right to retain and spend the funds for broadband connectivity was conditional upon their participation in an RBC. Councils which did not participate in an RBC were required to devolve the funds to schools, though there was a lack of clarity on what that meant and even less clarity on whether anything like it actually happened.

The funding level had now (2001) risen to an aggregate £44 million pa. At a meeting on 27 September 2001, the leading NGfL officer, Doug Brown, formally requested the ten RBC managers to produce a plan for connecting up their networks. At least one of the RBCs, WMnet, had no network to connect, but the policy remained. After some discussion, the RBC managers agreed to interconnect their regional networks by peering with the universities' JANET network. Councils were required to connect either through membership of an RBC or through their own peering arrangements, though once again there were no mechanisms for monitoring compliance with these requirements and no penalties for those councils which refused to comply. These regional networks connected through the SuperJanet backbone form the communications infrastructure of the nationwide collaboration which came to be known as the National Education Network (NEN)

== The 10 English RBCs ==
Cumbria and Lancashire Education Online	CLEO
East of England Broadband Consortium	E2BN
East Midlands Broadband Consortium	embc
London Grid for Learning	LGfL
Northern Grid for Learning	NGfL
North Western Grid for Learning	NWGfL
South East Grid for Learning	SEGfL
South West Grid for Learning	SWGfL
West Midlands Regional Broadband Consortium	WMnet
Yorks & Humber Grid for Learning	YHGfL

The RBCs have worked collaboratively since 2001 and have since been actively joined in their partnership by equivalent organizations in Northern Ireland (C2KN), Scotland (Glow) and Wales (NGfL Cymru). Key partners in RBC activities have been Becta and JANET.
