= National Council for Educational Technology =

- Abbreviation: NCET
- Formation: 1988
- Dissolved: renamed and restructured as Becta 1998
- Merger of: MESU and CET
- Purpose: Promotion and integration of ICT in education
- Location: Millburn Hill Road, Canley, Coventry, England, in the University of Warwick Science Park
- Region served: England, Wales, Northern Ireland
- Chief Executives: Noel Thompson, Graham Walters (acting), Margaret Bell, Mike Littlewood(acting), Owen Lynch

The National Council for Educational Technology provided advice and support for schools and colleges in England, Wales, and Northern Ireland on educational technology, in particular the use of computers for teaching and learning.

The Department for Education and Science merged the Council for Educational Technology and the MESU in 1989. The civil servant Noel Thompson, who promoted this change, became its first chief executive. It carried out evaluations of new technologies such as CD-ROMs, laptop computers and researched the effectiveness of different methods and techniques. It promoted the use of educational technology through publications, events, TV programmes.

== Structure and Governance ==
NCET was a charitable trust funded by government and formally a Non-Departmental Public Body. It had a Council (acting as the organisation's board of directors), whose chairman and chief executive were responsible to the Secretaries of State of the Education Departments in England, Northern Ireland and Wales. Its work was outlined in an annual priorities letter from the Department and a senior civil servant and HMI sat on its Board.

Margaret Parkes was the founding chair of the design and technology working group for the national curriculum in 1988 by Kenneth Baker. Their report in June 1989 rolled together the subjects of craft, art, design, business studies, and information technology to create a new subject of "Design and Technology". The new subject aspired to re-energise the teaching of practical subjects in Britain with the objective of doing the same to the economy. The new compulsory subject was introduced the following year. Parkes served until 1999.

== People ==
=== Chief executives ===
The chief executive was employed by the NCET Council to run the organisation and deliver its programme of work.

- Noel Thompson 1989-91
- Graham Walters (acting) 1991
- Margaret Bell 1992-1997
- Mike Littlewood (acting) 1997
- Owen Lynch 1997

=== Chairmen ===
The Chairmen were unpaid, except for their expenses, they chaired the Council and met with Ministers to agree the work of the organisation.

- Don Gratton 1989-90 - was a BBC Executive
- Margaret Parkes 1990-92 - Lady Parkes chaired the original Technology National Curriculum Working Party from 1988 to 1999.
- John Richards 1992-95
- Heather Du Quesnay 1995-97 was Director of Education for Lambeth

== Evaluations ==
With the increased resource being provided to schools for educational technology the NCET took on a role of piloting and evaluating new technologies. NCET's role was to provide appropriate evaluative evidence to them to ensure that this money was well spent. It also looked to help grow viable and appropriate commercial markets for IT products and through a number of NCET managed pilots and procurements it stimulated specific areas, for example, the introduction of CD-ROMs into schools. Similar initiatives of varying scales and technologies including portable computers for teachers, communications technologies, multimedia desktop computers, satellite technologies and integrated learning systems all contributed to keeping UK schools up to date with the changing pace of the technology during the 1990s.

== Research ==
As well as providing equipment and materials it was also part of NCET's brief to collate and disseminate research and case study evidence on the impact of IT on learning and educational institutions and to produce support materials for them. This included support for the Education Department's Superhighways Initiative from 1995-7 which ran 22 projects-supported by £12 million from commercial sponsors-that focus on the application of electronic communications in schools and colleges.

== Publications ==
Managing IT Inspecting IT

== NCET-TV ==
NCET-TV was a series of educational TV programmes aimed at helping the UK's teachers gain relevant IT skills. As part of BBC 2's The Learning Zone, the programmes will be transmitted on the first Wednesday of each month at 4.00am.

== Renaming to form Becta ==
Dennis Stevenson was asked by Tony Blair in 1996 to look at the use of computers in schools. He set up an independent enquiry, a panel of experts who took evidence from a wide range of bodies and individuals and published his report in March 1997, just in time for the forthcoming election. Following the election Dennis Stevenson advised the UK Government that NCET could be a useful organisation, but it needed to be more closely aligned to government and should be restructured. The organisation was renamed the British Educational Communications Technology Agency (Becta), restructured and given the task of developing "The National Grid for Learning" (NGfL).
