= The West Sussex Grid for Learning =

The West Sussex Grid for Learning (WSGfL) was launched by West Sussex County Council (WSCC), as part of the National Grid for Learning initiative. The National Grid for Learning (NGfL) was a United Kingdom Government-funded gateway to educational resources on the Internet. It featured many individually selected links to resources and materials deemed to be of high quality.

At the time of the launch, the WSGfL website was dedicated to the learning community of West Sussex - which included teachers, pupils, non-teaching staff, and parents. However, WSGfL is now much more. The WSGfL provides a filtered broadband connection, network services, online content and communities for all schools across West Sussex.

In 2010 the stand-alone WSGfL site was merged into the main WSCC website and was accessed through a portal there, this was done due to the reduced funding levels for grids for learning from the national government and it was no longer possible to maintain a dedicated resource to manage the site. In 2016 the WSGfL was decommissioned and some of t's functionality was merged onto the main council website whilst others were placed onto the SLA Online portal that may other authorities were using.

== South East Grid for Learning (SEGfL) ==
The South East Grid for Learning (SEGfL) covers a large geographical area. It is a populous consortium with over eight million residents and seventeen very different Local Authorities. SEGfL has 3,121 schools with 56,800 teachers and over 1,000,000 pupils.

SEGfL includes Bracknell Forest Borough Council, Brighton & Hove City Council, Buckinghamshire County Council, East Sussex County Council, Hampshire County Council, Isle of Wight Council, Kent County Council, Medway Council, Portsmouth City Council, Reading Borough Council, Royal Borough of Windsor and Maidenhead, Slough Borough Council, Southampton City Council, Surrey County Council, West Berkshire Council, West Sussex County Council, and Wokingham District Council.

== Contact ==
The WSGfL was initially managed and developed by the ICT Strategy & Initiatives team who are part of the Children & Young People's Services at WSCC.
