= Swarthmore Lecture =

Lecture at the Quaker Britain Yearly Meeting

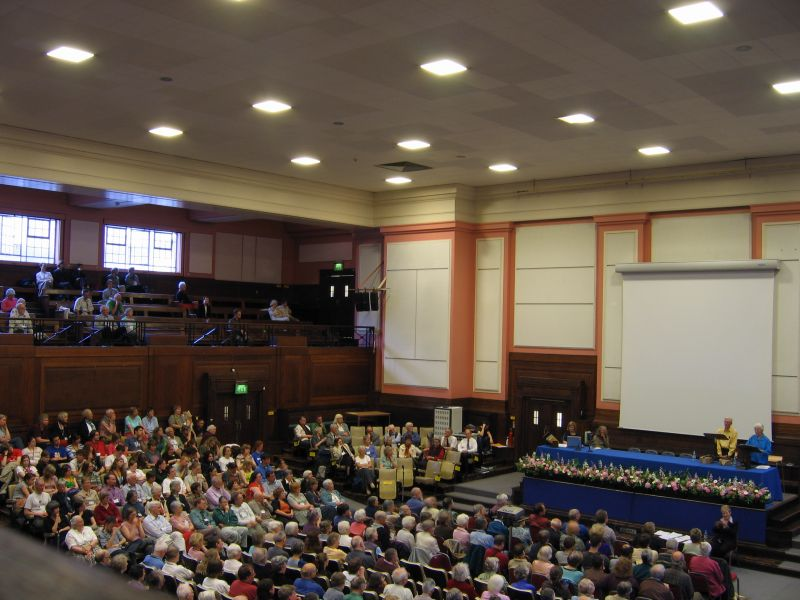
2006 Swarthmore Lecture at Friends House, London

The Swarthmore Lecture is one of a series of lectures, started in 1908, addressed to Britain Yearly Meeting of the Religious Society of Friends (Quakers).

The preface to the very first lecture explains the purpose of the series.

This book is the first of a series of public addresses to be known as the Swarthmore Lectures. The Lectureship was established by the Woodbrooke Extension Committee, at a meeting held December 9th, 1907. The Minute of the Committee provides for "an annual lecture on some subject relating to the Message and Work of the Society of Friends." The name "Swarthmore" was chosen in memory of the home of Margaret Fox, which was always open to the earnest seeker after Truth, and from which loving words of sympathy and substantial material help were sent to fellow-workers.

The Woodbrooke Extension Committee requested Rufus M. Jones, M.A., D.Litt., of Haverford College, Pennsylvania, to give the first lecture on the evening preceding the holding of the Friends’ Yearly Meeting of 1908. In accordance with this decision, the lecture was delivered in the Central Hall, Birmingham, on May 19th.

The Swarthmore Lectureship has been founded with a two-fold purpose: firstly, to interpret further to the members of the Society of Friends their Message and Mission; and secondly, to bring before the public the spirit, the aims and the fundamental principles of the Friends. This first lecture presents Quakerism as a religion of experience and first-hand reality—a dynamic, practical religion of life.

Transcripts and recording of some of the lectures are available from the Woodbrooke Quaker Study Centre website.

== List of Swarthmore Lectures ==
| Year | Author | Title | Notes |
|---|---|---|---|
| 1908 | Rufus M. Jones | Quakerism: a Religion of life | |
| 1909 | William Charles Braithwaite | Spiritual Guidance in the experience of the Society of Friends | |
| 1910 | Joan Mary Fry | The Communion of Life | |
| 1911 | Thomas Hodgkin | Human Progress and the Inward Light | |
| 1912 | Terrot Reaveley Glover | The Nature and Purpose of a Christian Society | For biographical information on the lecturer, see the Oxford Dictionary of National Biography article. |
| 1913 | Joshua Rowntree | Social Service - its place in the Society of Friends | |
| 1914 | Edward Grubb | The Historic and Inward Christ: a study in Quaker thought | For biographical information on the lecturer, see the Oxford Dictionary of National Biography article. |
| 1915 | Silvanus P. Thompson | The Quest For Truth | |
| 1916 | Henry T. Hodgkin | The Missionary Spirit and the Present Opportunity | |
| 1917 | William Littleboy | The Day of Our Visitation | |
| 1918 | Lucy Fryer Morland | The New Social Outlook | |
| 1919 | Lucy Violet Hodgkin | Silent Worship: The way of wonder | |
| May 1920 | Herbert G. Wood | Quakerism and the Future of the Church | For biographical information on the lecturer, see the Oxford Dictionary of National Biography article. |
| August 1920 | Rufus M. Jones | The Nature and Authority of Conscience | In August 1920 there was an All Friends Conference held. Rufus M. Jones gave the second 1920 Swarthmore Lecture on the eve of this event. |
| 1921 | T. Edmund Harvey | The Long Pilgrimage: human progress in the light of the Christian hope | |
| 1922 | Carl Heath | Religion and Public Life | |
| 1923 | Helen Maria Sturge | Personal Religion and the Service of Humanity | |
| 1924 | Gerald Kenway Hibbert | The Inner Light and Modern Thought | |
| 1925 | John William Graham | The Quaker ministry | |
| 1926 | A. Neave Brayshaw | The Things that Are Before Us | |
| 1927 | Henry Thomas Silcock | Christ and the World's Unrest | |
| 1928 | John S. Hoyland | Light of Christ | |
| 1929 | Arthur Stanley Eddington | Science and the Unseen world | U.S. Macmillan, UK Allen & Unwin.: 1980 Reprint Arden Library ISBN 0-8495-1426-6.; 2004 U.S. reprint - Whitefish, Montana: Kessinger Publications: ISBN 1-4179-1728-8.; 2007 UK reprint by Quaker Books, BYM, with a new foreword by George Ellis, Allen & Unwin ISBN 978-0-901689-81-8 |
| 1930 | Gerhart von Schulze-Gaevernitz | Democracy and Religion: a study in Quakerism | |
| 1931 | Howard Brinton | Creative Worship | |
| 1932 | Francis E. Pollard | Education and the Spirit of Man | |
| 1933 | Shipley N. Brayshaw | Unemployment and Plenty | |
| 1934 | George Barker Jeffery | Christ, Yesterday And Today | |
| 1935 | William Ernest Wilson | Our Response To God | |
| 1936 | Howard E. Collier | Towards a New Manner of Living | |
| 1937 | Caroline Cassandra Graveson | Religion and Culture | |
| 1938 | A. Barratt Brown | Democratic Leadership | |
| 1939 | David Elton Trueblood | The Trustworthiness of Religious Experience | |
| 1940 | John Armstrong Hughes | The Light of Christ in a Pagan World | |
| 1941 | Edgar Bradshaw Castle | The Undivided Mind | |
| 1942 | Margaret M. Harvey | The Law of Liberty | |
| 1943 | Leyton Richards | Planning for Freedom | |
| 1944 | W. Russell Brain | Man, Society and Religion | |
| 1945 | Wilfrid Allott | Worship And Social Progress | |
| 1946 | Joseph Edward Hoare | The Warrant For Youth's Search | |
| 1947 | John W. Harvey | The Salt and the Leaven | |
| 1948 | There was no lecture this year | | |
| 1949 | Roger C.Wilson | Authority, Leadership and Concern. A study in motive and administration in Quaker relief work | ISBN 0-85245-021-4 |
| 1950 | Konrad Braun | Justice & the Law of Love | |
| 1951 | Richard Duncan Fairn | Quakerism — a faith for ordinary men | |
| 1952 | Thomas Farrimond Green | Preparation for Worship | ISBN 0-85245-046-X |
| 1953 | Kathleen Lonsdale | Removing the Causes of War | |
| 1954 | Wilhelm Aarek | From Loneliness To Fellowship: A study in psychology and Quakerism | Article on Wilhelm Aarek at Norwegian Wikipedia. |
| 1955 | Douglas V. Steere | Where Words Come From - an interpretation of the ground & practise of Quaker worship & ministry | ISBN 0-85245-067-2 |
| 1956 | Edgar Grieve Dunstan | Quakers & the Religious Quest | |
| 1957 | Henry J. Cadbury | Quakerism & Early Christianity | |
| 1958 | Margaret B. Hobling | The Concrete & the Universal | |
| 1959 | Harold Loukes | The Castle and the Field | |
| 1960 | Kenneth C. Barnes | The Creative Imagination | |
| 1961 | Richard Karl Ullmann | Tolerance and the Intolerable | Biographical article in German Wikipedia |
| 1962 | J. Duncan Wood | Building the Institutions of Peace | |
| 1963 | L. Hugh Doncaster | God in Every Man | |
| 1964 | Richenda C. Scott | Tradition and Experience | |
| 1965 | John Macmurray | Search for Reality in Religion | ISBN 0-85245-001-X |
| 1966 | William E. Barton | The Moral Challenge of Communism: Some Ethical aspects of Marxist/Leninist Society | |
| 1967 | Kathleen M. Slack | Constancy and Change in the Society of Friends | |
| 1968 | William Homan Thorpe | Quakers and Humanists | |
| 1969 | Maurice A. Creasey | Bearings, or, Friends and the new reformation | |
| 1970 | Kenneth E. Boulding | Prospering of Truth | |
| 1971 | Charles Frederick Carter | On having a sense of all conditions | For biographical information on the lecturer, see the Oxford Dictionary of National Biography. |
| 1972 | Richard S. Peters | Reason, Morality and Religion | ISBN 0-7100-7651-7 |
| 1973 | George H. Gorman | Amazing Fact of Quaker Worship | ISBN 0-85245-100-8 |
| 1974 | Wolf Mendl | Prophets and Reconcilers, Reflections on the Quaker Peace Testimony | ISBN 0-85245-115-6 |
| 1975 | Ralph Hetherington | The Sense of Glory - A psychological study of peak-experiences | ISBN 0-85245-117-2 |
| 1976 | W. Grigor McClelland | And a new earth: Making tomorrow's society better than today's | ISBN 0-85245-122-9 |
| 1977 | Damaris Parker-Rhodes | Truth - a Path & not a Possession: A Quaker woman's journey | ISBN 0-85245-124-5 |
| 1978 | John Ormerod Greenwood | Signs of Life: Art and Religious Experience | ISBN 0-85245-131-8 |
| 1979 | John Reader | Of Schools and Schoolmasters. Some thoughts on the Quaker contribution to Education | ISBN 0-85245-140-7 |
| 1980 | Janet Scott | What Canst Thou Say? Towards a Quaker theology | ISBN 0-85245-151-2 |
| 1981 | Adam Curle | True Justice, Quaker peace makers and peace making | ISBN 0-85245-156-3 |
| 1982 | Gerald Priestland | Reasonable Uncertainty: a Quaker approach to doctrine | ISBN 0-85245-161-X |
| 1983 | Michael Rutter | A Measure of Our Values: goals & dilemmas in the upbringing of children | ISBN 0-85245-170-9 |
| 1984 | Laurence Lerner | Two Cinnas: Quakerism, Revolution and Poetry. A dialogue | ISBN 0-85245-182-2 |
| 1985 | Christopher Holdsworth | Steps in a Large Room: a Quaker explores the monastic tradition | ISBN 0-85245-188-1 |
| 1986 | Quaker Women's Group | Bringing the Invisible into the Light. Some Quaker Feminists speak of their experience | ISBN 0-85245-199-7 (Lecture performed at the University of Exeter) |
| 1987 | John Lampen | Mending Hurts | ISBN 0-85245-206-3 |
| 1988 | Harvey Gillman | A Minority of One | ISBN 0-85245-207-1 |
| 1989 | S. Jocelyn Burnell | Broken for Life | ISBN 0-85245-222-5, given at the University of Aberdeen 2010/2011 reprint is planned by Quaker Books, BYM. |
| 1990 | John Punshon | Testimony and Tradition: some aspects of Quaker spirituality | ISBN 0-85245-231-4 |
| 1991 | Geoffrey Hubbard | Patterns and Examples. Quaker Attitudes and European Opportunities | ISBN 0-85245-236-5 |
| 1992 | Brenda Clifft Heales & Chris Cook | Images and Silence: Future of Quaker Ministry | ISBN 0-85245-242-X |
| 1993 | Sydney D. Bailey | Peace is a Process | ISBN 0-85245-249-7 |
| 1994 | Margaret Heathfield | Being together: our corporate life in the Religious Society of Friends | ISBN 0-85245-254-3 |
| 1995 | Anne Thomas | Only Fellow-Voyagers. Creation stories as guides for the journey | ISBN 0-85245-272-1 |
| 1996 | Jonathan Dale | Beyond the Spirit of the Age | ISBN 0-85245-282-9 |
| 1997 | Christine Trevett | Previous Convictions and end of the millennium Quakerism | ISBN 0-85245-290-X |
| 1998 | Young Friends General Meeting | Who do we think we are? Young Friends' Commitment and Belonging | ISBN 0-85245-299-3 |
| 1999 | Alex Wildwood | A faith to call our own. Quaker tradition in the light of contemporary movements of the Spirit | ISBN 0-85245-312-4 |
| 2000 | Tim Newell | Forgiving Justice. A Quaker vision for criminal justice | Original: ISBN 0-85245-321-3; 2007 reprint: ISBN 978-0-901689-51-1 |
| 2001 | Tony Stoller | Wrestling with the Angel | ISBN 0-85245-326-4 |
| 2002 | Jackie Leach Scully | Playing in the Presence: genetics, ethics and spirituality | ISBN 0-85245-337-X |
| 2003 | Eleanor Nesbitt | Interfaith Pilgrims: living truths and truthful living | ISBN 0-85245-347-7 |
| 2004 | Simon Fisher | Spirited living: waging conflict, building peace | ISBN 0-85245-357-4 |
| 2005 | Helen Steven | No Extraordinary Power: Prayer, Stillness and Activism | ISBN 0-85245-379-5 |
| 2006 | Roger and Susan Sawtell | Reflections from a Long Marriage | ISBN 0-85245-394-9 |
| 2007 | Beth Allen | Ground and Spring: the foundation of Quaker Discipleship | ISBN 978-0-901689-67-2, BYM Press Release |
| 2008 | Christine A. M. Davis | Minding the Future | ISBN 0-901689-88-2; ISBN 978-0-901689-88-7 |
| 2009 | Peter Eccles | The presence in the midst: reflections on discernment | ISBN 978-1-907123-03-0, the 2009 Swarthmore Lecture was given during Yearly Meeting Gathering at University of York on Tuesday 28 July. |
| 2010 | Paul Lacey | The unequal world we inhabit | ISBN 978-1-907123-12-2, the 2010 Swarthmore Lecture was given during Yearly Meeting in London on Saturday 29 May 2010. |
| 2011 | Pam Lunn | Costing not less than everything: Sustainability and spirituality in challenging times | The 2011 Swarthmore Lecture was given at Yearly Meeting Gathering in Canterbury on Monday 1 August 2011. ISBN 978-1-907123-21-4 |
| 2012 | Rachel Brett | Snakes and Ladders: A personal exploration of Quaker work on human rights at the United Nations | The 2012 Swarthmore Lecture was given at Yearly Meeting in London, on 26 May 2012. It was published by Quaker Books. A free MP3 audio is available from the Woodbrooke website. |
| 2013 | Gerald Hewitson | Journey Into Life: Inheriting the story of early Friends | The 2013 Swarthmore Lecture was given at Yearly Meeting in London, on 25 May 2013. ISBN 978-1-907123-47-4. Available online as an Audio recording .MP3, Text (Word document) and Text (PDF) at the Woodbrooke website |
| 2014 | Ben Pink Dandelion | Open for Transformation: being Quaker | The 2014 Swarthmore Lecture was given during Yearly Meeting Gathering at the University of Bath on Sunday 3 August 2014. ISBN 9781907123689. An online audio recording is available. |
| 2015 | Diana Francis | Faith, power and peace | The 2015 Swarthmore Lecture was given during Britain Yearly Meeting at Friends House, London on Saturday 2 May 2015 |
| 2016 | Esther Mombo and Cécile Nyiramana | Mending broken hearts; rebuilding shattered lives - Quaker peace building in eastern Africa | The 2016 Swarthmore Lecture was given during Britain Yearly Meeting at Friends House, London, May 2016 |
| 2017 | Catherine West MP and Cllr Andy Hull | Faith in politics? | The Swarthmore Lecture 2017: Faith in politics? A testimony to equality was given by Catherine West on Monday 31 July 2017 as part of Yearly Meeting Gathering at Warwick University. ISBN 9 781999 726904 |
| 2018 | Chris Alton | Changing ourselves, changing the world | The 2018 Swarthmore Lecture was given during Britain Yearly meeting at Friends House, London on 5 May. |
| 2019 | Eden Grace | On Earth as it is in Heaven; The Kingdom of God and the yearning of Creation | The 2019 Swarthmore Lecture was given during Britain Yearly meeting at Friends House, London in May. |
| 2020 | Tom Shakespeare | Openings to the Infinite Ocean: A Friendly Offering of Hope | |
| 2021 | Thomas Penny | Kinder Ground: Creating Space for Truth | |
| 2022 | Helen Minnis | Perceiving the Temperature of the Water | |
| 2023 | Esther Loukin | How we can change society | |
| 2024 | Ben Jarman | Getting What We Deserve? Imprisonment and the Challenge of Doing Justice | |
| 2025 | Emily Provance | A Testimony of Community | |
| 2026 | Stuart Masters | Tangled Roots: Navigating the Complex Legacy of Early Quakers | The 2026 Swarthmore Lecture was given during Britain Yearly Meeting at Friends House, London on 2 May. |

For further details see the list of lectures at the Woodbrooke Centre.

== See also ==
- Backhouse Lecture: Friends lecture series in Australia
