= Raoul Franklin =

British physicist (1935–2021)

Raoul Norman Franklin CBE FREng (3 June 1935 – 7 October 2021), was a physicist, working in the field of plasma physics, who was Vice-Chancellor of the City University in London for 20 years.

== Life ==
Franklin was educated at Howick District High School and Auckland Grammar School (both in New Zealand). He then studied at the University of New Zealand (obtaining a BE and a BSc in 1956), then at the University of Auckland (obtaining an ME and MSc in mathematics in 1957). He then moved to the University of Oxford, obtaining his doctorate as a member of Christ Church, Oxford. After working as a senior research fellow at the Royal Military College of Science in Shrivenham, Oxfordshire, from 1961 to 1963, he was a Fellow of Keble College, Oxford, from 1963 to 1978, and a university lecturer in Engineering Science from 1966 to 1978. He was then appointed Vice-Chancellor of City University, London, holding the post from 1978 to 1998; he held the position of professor of Plasma Physics and Technology in addition from 1986 to 1998. Whilst at City University, he worked in collaboration with industry and business, raising additional income for the university. His work also resulted in the university winning four Queen's Awards for Enterprise (for technology, in 1982 and 1985, and for export, in 1988 and 1991).

In 1998, he was appointed a visiting professor by the Open University. His publications in the field of plasma physics include Plasma Phenomena in Gas Discharges (1976) and various scientific papers. He has been described as "one of the world's leading researchers in plasma physics", writing "many papers of international significance".

He was appointed an honorary fellow of Keble College in 1980, and appointed Commander of the Order of the British Empire (CBE) in 1995. He served as chairman of the Assessment and Qualifications Alliance (AQA) from 1998 to 2003, having served as chairman of Associated Examining Board, one of AQA's predecessor institutions, from 1994 to 1998. He was also elected a Fellow of the Royal Academy of Engineering. Franklin died on 7 October 2021.

Academic offices
Preceded by Edward Parkes	Vice-Chancellor, City University, London; 1978–1998	Succeeded by David Rhind
