= Laurence Lerner =

Literary critic

Laurence Lerner (12 December 1925 – 19 January 2016), often called Larry, was a South African-born British literary critic, poet, novelist, and lecturer, recognized for his achievement with his election to The Royal Society of Literature.

== Biography ==
Laurence Lerner was born in Cape Town, South Africa; his Jewish father Israel was from Zhitomir, Ukraine and his mother May from Abinger Hammer, England. He was educated at St George's Grammar School, Cape Town, the University of Cape Town and Pembroke College, Cambridge.

He was lecturer in English, from 1949 to 1953 at the University College of the Gold Coast in West Africa, from 1953 to 1962 tutor then lecturer in English at Queen's University Belfast (where one of his students was Seamus Heaney), lecturer then reader then professor of English at the University of Sussex (1962–84), and Edwin Mims Professor of English at Vanderbilt University, Nashville, Tennessee (1985–95). He won the 1991 Harvie Branscomb Distinguished Professor Award.

Lerner taught in many universities around the world in addition to those where he held positions, including Munich, Dijon, various places in the US and Canada, Kashmir, Wurzburg, and Vienna. On British Council lecture tours he traveled to France, Germany, Spain, South America, Turkey and India. These experiences led to his most personal book, Wandering Professor.

Although he described himself as a follower who was surprised to be accepted, Lerner was an active member of the Society of Friends (Quakers), attending Brighton, Nashville and then Lewes meetings. For many years, he taught a Shakespeare summer school at the Woodbrooke Quaker Study Centre. He gave the Swarthmore Lecture in 1984 (The Two Cinnas – Quakerism, Revolution and Poetry). He was Clerk to the Lewes meeting for several years. He was also a Governor of Leighton Park School, a Quaker school in England.

He published nine collections of poetry, three novels, ten books of literary criticism, reflections on English language usage and life as a professor, and lectures, essays and poems. He edited two anthologies of modern literary criticism of Shakespeare's plays for Penguin Books, which were widely used by A-level students in the UK.

== Personal life ==
He married Natalie Winch in 1948, whom he met in South Africa. Their marriage lasted until her death in 2014. They had four sons, David and Edwin, born in Accra, Ghana, and Martin and Richard, born in Belfast, Northern Ireland.

He died on 19 January 2016 at the age of 90.

== Works ==
=== Poetry ===
- Domestic Interior, Hutchinson, 1959
- The Directions of Memory, Chatto & Windus, 1964
- Selves, Routledge, 1969 ISBN 978-0710064080.
- A.R.T.H.U.R.: the life and opinions of a digital computer. University of Massachusetts Press. 1975. ISBN 978-0-87023-181-0.
- A.R.T.H.U.R & M.A.R.T.H.A. The loves of the computers, Secker & Warburg, 1980 ISBN 978-0436244407
- The Man I Killed, Secker & Warburg, 1980 ISBN 978-0-436245503
- Chapter & Verse: Bible Poems, Secker & Warburg, 1984 ISBN 0-436-24441-1
- Selected Poems, Secker & Warburg, 1984
- Rembrandt's Mirror, Secker & Warburg, 1987 ISBN 0-436-24444-6

=== Fiction ===
- The Englishman, Hamish Hamilton, 1959
- A Free Man, Chatto & Windus, 1968 ISBN 978-0701112677
- My Grandfather's Grandfather, Secker & Warburg, 1985 ISBN 0-436-24443-8

=== Criticism ===
- The Truest Poetry: An essay on the Question, What is Literature? Hamish Hamilton, 1960
- The Art of George Eliot. A selection of contemporary reviews (including Henry James, George Saintsbury, Geraldine Jewsbury and Sidney Colvin), with John Holstrom, Bodley Head, 1966
- The Truthtellers: Jane Austen, George Eliot, D H Lawrence, Chatto & Windus, 1967
- The Uses of Nostalgia: Studies in Pastoral, Chatto & Windus, 1972 ISBN 0-7011-1826-1
- An introduction to English poetry: fifteen poems discussed by Laurence Lerner, Edward Arnold, 1975 ISBN 978-0-7131-5789-5.
- The Victorians, Methuen, 1978, ISBN 978-0-416-56210-1
- Love & Marriage: Literature in its Social Context, Edward Arnold, 1979
- The Literary Imagination: Essays on Literature & Society, Harvester, 1982
- The Frontiers of Literature, Blackwell, 1988
- Angels and Absences: child deaths in the nineteenth century, Vanderbilt University Press, 1997, ISBN 978-0-8265-1287-1
- Reading Women's Poetry. Sussex Academic Press. 2009. ISBN 978-1-84519-337-9.

=== Other works ===
- Shakespeare's Tragedies; An Anthology of Modern Criticism, Penguin, 1963, ASIN B000GR3A7W
- Shakespeare's Comedies; An Anthology of Modern Criticism, Penguin, 1967, ASIN B002R84WZC
- "The History of a Poem", The Dark Horse, Summer 1997
- You Can't Say That! English Usage Today. Cambridge University Press. 2010. ISBN 978-0-521-14097-3.
- Wandering Professor, Caliban, 1999, ISBN 0-9536307-0-6.

== Poem ==
Here is a poem by Laurence Lerner (not infringing copyright, since submitted by the author, who holds the copyright!)

Kaspar Hauser

All that long time there was the place I was,
All that long same, the dark and constant same.
I came to being and it bit my eyes.

I want to be a rider like my father.
A soldier was my father was a horseman.
I want to be a rider and I want

Out of that same he carried me upstairs,
Out of that dark and then I stood to lean;
The soft ground stood and hit me where I fell.

When it was hunger time they put soft life
Into my mouth. It moved. The warm flesh tore
Under my teeth. This could be me I'm eating.

I spat and called: I loved that time, those horses,
The brittle bread, the water, the soft dark,
The stiff floor always there, the always steady

Till I was carried to the bumpy world:
The air threw needles at my eyes. I fell.
Where were my walls, my horse to push, and where –

I want my floor my bread my dark my always –
I want the same the only same the only –
I want to be a rider like my father

== Readings ==
Readings by Laurence Lerner of several of his poems appear on YouTube

== See also ==
- List of South Africans
