= John Lampen =

British Quaker writer and peace educator

John Lampen (born 1938) is a Quaker peace educator and writer. He is married to Diana Lampen. In 1987, he gave the Swarthmore Lecture, entitled Mending Hurts.

For twenty years, he worked with emotionally disturbed adolescent boys at Shotton Hall School, Shropshire. One of his students, Andrew Liddell, states, "Mr Lampen and his family helped me to develop my character and core values. I will never forget them."

Then John lived in South Africa for some months. He then moved to Derry in Northern Ireland, working in the communities with young people and seeking reconciliation.

Currently, Diana and John Lampen run a small training and consultancy agency, The Hope Project, based in Stourbridge, England, which works for peace in partnership with local organizations in Britain, Belarus, Bosnia, Croatia, Uganda and Ukraine.

== Publications ==
- Library of the Society of Friends | Quakers in BritainThoughts on aggression / with Lennhoff, F. G.; Williams, A. Hyatt; Shrewsbury : Shotton Hall - 1972
- Thinking About Conscience / with Lennhoff, F.G., Shotton Hall Publications - 1974 ISBN 0-904902-00-5
- Towards Self-Discipline / with Lennhoff F.G., Shotton Hall Publications - 1975 ISBN 0-904902-02-1
- Wait in the light : the spirituality of George Fox : a selection of the writings of George Fox and early Friends - 1981
- Will Warren : a scrapbook : a Quaker in Northern Ireland / Introduction by Barritt, Denis Quaker Home Service - 1983 ISBN 0-85245-166-0
- Twenty questions about Jesus Quaker Home Service - 1985 ISBN 0-85245-186-5 reprinted 1995
- "Sigmund Freud's attack on religion" In: The Friends' quarterly; (October 1985), p. 577-583 - 1985
- Un Quaker en Irlande du Nord : un example d'action non-violente, Introduction by Barritt, Denis P. 1914–1993; Lampen, John, b. 1938; translated by Haywood, Nelly; Benoist, Odile.Lausanne : Centre Martin Luther King - 1985
- If stones could speak: glimpses of a city over three hundred years [Londonderry] / with Speroy, A; Derry : North West Centre for Learning and Development (1985)
- "Living in a violent society" In: The Friends' quarterly; (January 1985), p. 431-435 - 1985
- Mending hurts - (Swarthmore Lecture) - 1987
- Introduction to A minority of one [sound recording] : the 1988 Swarthmore lecture by Gillman, Harvey - 1988
- "Justice and peace" In: The Friends' quarterly(April 1989), p. 266-271 - 1989
- A relaxation handbook : dealing with stress and becoming a more peaceful person/ with Lampen, Diana; Derry : Yes! Publications, - 1991
- The peace kit : everyday peace-making for young people / with Downey, Cormac. - 1992
- Findings : poets and the crisis of faith Wallingford, PA : Pendle Hill Publications,(Pendle Hill pamphlets#310) - c1993 ISBN 0-87574-310-2
- "The Ulster Quaker Peace Education Project", with Farrell, Seamus - in Countering bullying : initiatives by schools and local authorities / [edited by] Delwyn Tattum and Graham Herbert. 1993
- Conflict-busters : the young people's guide to mediation in schools Londonderry : Quaker Peace Education Project - [1994?]
- "Committed not to words but to a way" : a review of "Quaker faith & practice" (Britain Yearly Meeting, 1995) In: The Friends' quarterly (October 1995), p. 372-377 - 1995
- The gospel of peace : the Biblical basis of pacifism Fellowship of Reconciliation - 1995, OCLC 34090637
- Building the Peace: Good Practice in Community Relations Work in Northern Ireland Northern Ireland Community Relations Council 1995 ISBN 1-898276-08-0
- A guided journey / with Lampen, Diana; Philadelphia, Pa. : Wider Quaker Fellowship - 1997
- Young people handling conflict : a training course for teenagers / with Lampen, Diana; Wheeldon, Andrew / Quaker Peace Centre (Cape Town). - 1997
- Instruments of peace : unofficial peace workers in protracted social conflicts Thesis submitted to University of London, King's College Department of War Studies - 1998 (copy at The Library of the Society of Friends, London)
- No alternative? : nonviolent responses to repressive regimes York, Sessions - 2000 ISBN 1-85072-243-9
- The peace kit / with Downey, Cormac. - 2005 reprinted 2007
- Endeavours to mend : perspectives on British Quaker work in the world today / with Phillips, Brian David Quaker Books, - 2006 ISBN 0-85245-388-4
- Finding the words : Quaker experience and language Stourbridge, The Hope Project - [2007] (8 pages)
- "The intellectual background to the early Quaker message" In: The Friends' quarterly; (January 2008), p. 1-7 - 2008
- Seeing, hearing, knowing : reflections on Experiment with Light York, Sessions - 2008 ISBN 978-1-85072-372-1
- "Truth and powerlessness" In: The Friends' quarterly(July 2009), p. 3-9 - 2009
- The worship kit : a young person's guide to Quaker worship Quaker Books - 2010 ISBN 978-1-907123-14-6
- Answering the Violence: Encounters with Perpetrators, Pendle Hill pamphlet series No. 412, Wallingford, PA, Pendle Hill Quaker Center (2011) ISBN 978-0-87574-412-4
