= Geoffrey Hubbard =

Geoffrey Hubbard (22 May 1923 – June 1998) was director of the National Council for Educational Technology (now called "British Educational Communications and Technology Agency; becta) and Chair of the National Extension College's trustees from 1989 to his death in June 1998.

He was also a well-known, active Quaker. He gave the Swarthmore Lecture at London Yearly Meeting 1991, published as Patterns and Examples. Quaker Attitudes and European Opportunities. He also wrote an introduction to the Quaker faith: Quaker by Convincement(1974).
