= National Development Programme in Computer Aided Learning =

The National Development Programme in Computer Aided Learning (NDPCAL) was the earliest large-scale education programme in the United Kingdom to explore the use of computers for teaching and learning.

First proposed in 1969 to the Department of Education and Science by the National Council for Educational Technology. it ran from 1973 to 1977 spending £2.5M to support some 35 projects covering a range of subjects.

About half the money was spent on projects in universities and the rest on projects in schools, colleges, industrial and military training. Richard Hooper was appointed its Director and operated with a small central team and the programme was administered by the Council for Educational Technology.

== Origins ==
During the 1960s various projects in the US and the UK using mainframe and minicomputers began to develop the field of Computer Aided Learning and there was much debate about its value and effectiveness. The National Council for Educational Technology produced advice to government in 1969 to run a national development programme to explore the value of these approaches.

The Department for Education and Science (DES) announced in 1972 the approval by then Secretary of State Margaret Thatcher of a "national development programme in computer assisted learning." Following the announcement of the programme, the post of director was advertised and Richard Hooper was selected.

== Strategy ==
NDPCAL's strategy was to work mainly with existing projects in Computer Aided Learning but also to develop feasibility projects with those with good ideas. It required joint funding from the host establishment and stipulated effective evaluation and monitoring processes but allowed a significant degree of autonomy to the projects. The approach of the central team was active and interventionist, working alongside potential projects in their early stages to help develop their design and approach. They required four monthly accounting periods and carefully controlling expenditure.

== Governance ==
CET was asked to provide administrative services to the new programme, and the programme's central staff were CET employees but executive control was with a committee made up of civil servants from seven government departments plus a group of co-opted advisers. This programme committee was chaired by the DES and held the final say on proposals from the programme director. It also involved itself in project evaluation, setting up sub-committees of three or so of its members to look in detail at a particular proposal or project. Although each of the thirty projects had its own steering committee national linkage was maintained through a member of the national programme committee sitting on each project steering committee.

== Setting Up ==
From January 1973 to early summer 1973, there was a phase of exploration and consultation and from the summer of 1973 to the end of the year, there was the setting up of the programme's management structure and of the first generation of major projects, notably in the university sector. Hooper was supported by two assistant directors, Gillian Frewin (from ICL) and Roger Miles (from the Army School of Instructional Technology). They were supported by two other executive posts and three secretaries.

The programme formulated two main aims over its lifetime (Hooper, 1975, p17):

1. to develop and secure the assimilation of computer assisted and computer managed learning on a regular institutional basis at reasonable cost
2. to make recommendations to appropriate agencies in the public and private sector (including Government) concerning possible future levels and types of investment in computer assisted and computer managed learning in education and training.

Two evaluations were set up, one to consider the educational benefits and one to consider the financial aspects.

== Breadth of Projects ==
This first government funded programme focused on their use for learning subjects other than programming. It supported some 35 projects, seven in schools, a number in higher education but the majority were based on the British armed services’ growing interest in developing more automated and managed approaches to training. The hardware was limited; the computers were large expensive cabinets of complicated electronics accessed mainly by paper tape with Teletype printouts but already the focus was more on the way technology could be used to improve teaching and learning than as a subject in its own right.

NDPCAL funded a wide range of different projects - of different types, covering a range of subjects and age ranges sectors. Some of these, such as Chelsea College's computers in the undergraduate science curriculum, developed into the computers in the curriculum project and Hertfordshire's computer-managed mathematics helped the Advisory Unit for Computer Based Education (AUCBE) at Hatfield develop.

It classified projects into different stages

- Stage 1 - Design and Feasibility - a project that shows that a particular application of CAL or CML is feasible by developing and piloting applications.
- Stage 2 - Development and Transferability - the creation of a working system for increasing numbers of students across a number of institutions.
- Stage 3 - Model Operation - a fully operational project able to act as a model for others.
- Stage 4 - Assimilation and Dissemination - national funding is being phased out and the institution has taken ownership with other new institutions taking it up.

About half the project funds were spent on projects in universities and polytechnics, about one-sixth of the project funds was spent on schools based projects and the rest on military and industrial training. Some of the projects are listed below.

- Computer Based Learning Project on Applied Statistics for Social Science, Leeds University - Director: J.R. Hartley
- Computer Assisted Learning in Engineering Sciences Director: Dr. P.R. Smith Faculty of Engineering, Computer Assisted Teaching Unit, Queen Mary College.
- Computer Assisted Learning in Chemistry Director: Dr. P.B. Ayscough Dept. of Physical Chemistry, The University of Leeds.
- Computers in the Undergraduate Science Curriculum Director: Dr. I. McKenzie, University College London
- Hertfordshire Computer Managed Mathematics in Schools Director: Dr. W.Tagg, Advisory Unit for Computer Based Education

== Evaluation ==
NDPCAL set up two independent evaluations: an educational evaluation carried out by the University of East Anglia and a financial evaluation by Peat, Marwick, Mitchell and Co.

The Educational Evaluation, UNCAL (Understanding Computer Assisted Learning) was carried out over a period of three years evaluation project and reported findings about CAL in general. Its findings echo many of the later findings of the effectiveness of e-learning :

- It is the versatility of the computer as an aid that assures its educational future
- CAL, like most innovation, provides an add-on experience at an add-on cost
- Much of the learning seen within NDPCAL fell into the category of higher-order learning
- CAL is a demanding medium for learning - virtually guaranteeing the students engagement
- Some forms of CAL enforce a strict role of learner on the student - this may need to be complemented by other forms
- CAL offers the student uninhibited learning opportunities within a 'privacy of risk'
- Learning may be inhibited by interface problems - where the student needs to put extra effort into keyboard skills, learning new computer protocols
- Current CAL still requires more adaption of the student to the machine
- Students like working on CAL but are frustrated by technical problems
- CAL is change-oriented not efficiency-oriented
- CAL supports teacher development since it encourages a team approach
- At present CAL development requires access to high level computer expertise.

The financial evaluation reported some tentative but interesting conclusions in their study that again reflect later findings on e-learning:

- CAL will always be an extra cost
- There are no realisable cash savings or benefits from CAL
- Claims that CAL will 'save' academic staff time are oversimplified and unjustifiable
- The time taken to develop science packages varies between 200 and 400 hours
- Inter-institutional development has been a success leading to substantial savings
- Large scale applications of CAL require full-time staff and regular computer time.

They calculated the 'national or total cost per student terminal hour' in the range £4-£15 by comparison the cost of conventional teaching was in the range £0.60-£2.50 per student hour.
