= Caroline Graveson =

English teacher and author (1874–1958)

Caroline Cassandra Graveson (1874–1958) was an English teacher and author.

Graveson was born on 16^{th} June 1874, one of six children of grocer Michael Graveson and his wife Hanna. She was educated at Ackworth School, Pontefract and the Jersey College for Girls. She gained a BA from Liverpool University College in 1892–6 and studied at the University of Jena in Germany from 1896–8. In 1898–9 she gained a teaching diploma from Cambridge Training College.

Graveson was Assistant Lecturer in Education at Bangor University and Mistress of Method and Lecturer on Education at Liverpool University. She was then appointed Vice-Principal and Mistress of Method at the Greenwich Day Training College.

In 1905, she was appointed women’s Vice Principal of Goldsmiths College, University of London. She wrote the words for the College hymn and contributed to a book about the College’s history. She retired in 1958. The College now has a Caroline Graveson Building in her honour.

Graveson was one of the first women members of the British Psychological Society.

She was an author of historical novels and books on teaching scripture to young children.

In 1937, she delivered the Swarthmore Lecture on the topic ‘Religion and Culture’.

She died in 1958.
