= Lucy Fryer Morland =

English humanitarian campaigner (1864–1945)

Lucy Fryer Morland (1864–1945) was an English headmistress and humanitarian campaigner.

== Early life ==
She was born on 12 June 1864 in Croydon, the eldest of fourteen children of Charles Morland, an umbrella manufacturer, and his wife Jane, née Fryer. Educated at The Mount School, York, she won a scholarship to study Arts at Bedford College, London, gaining a BA in 1885.

She worked as a high school teacher in Croydon, where she served on the School Board from 1897–1922.

== Campaigning ==
Morland was active in the Liberal Movement, the Women’s Suffrage Union, the National Education Committee, the War and Social Order Committee, the Croydon Literary and Scientific Society and the Croydon Guild of Help, whose magazine she edited. In 1905 she and Ellen Crickmay set up a voluntary programme to provide free school meals, which formed the basis of a ‘dining room for mothers’ scheme in World War I. Her public letters address issues including suffrage, education and conscription. In 1916, she was given a role in the Croydon Mayor’s Relief Fund, but resigned it when she realised that it was involved with conscription. She joined the Independent Labour Party in protest against conscription.

In 1918 she delivered the Swarthmore Lecture titled ‘The New Social Outlook’ on the subject of service, which was published in 1919.

In 1920–1 she did humanitarian work in South Africa, Australia and New Zealand.

She died in 1945.
