= Microelectronics Education Programme =

The UK government's Microelectronics Education Programme ran from 1980 to 1986. It was conceived and planned by a Labour government and set up under a Conservative government during Mrs Thatcher's era. It aimed to explore how computers could be used in schools in the UK. This was a controversial time for Conservative school policies.

The programme was administered by the Council for Educational Technology in London, but the directorate operated, unusually, from a semi-detached house on the Coach Lane Campus of the then Newcastle Polytechnic (now Northumbria University).

== Origins ==
The Microelectronics Education Programme was developed by the Department for Education and Science when the Prime Minister at the time, Jim Callaghan asked each government department to draw up an action plan to meet the challenge of new technologies. Whilst the prior programme, the National Development Programme in Computer Aided Learning, covered schools, colleges, universities and training establishments, MEP was specifically aimed at secondary schools in England, Northern Ireland and Wales (a primary school programme was added in 1982). Following a change of government in 1979, Keith Joseph as Education Secretary finally approved the proposal in 1980 and in March a four-year programme for schools, costing £9 million. was announced by the Under Secretary of State at the Department of Education and Science, Mr Neil MacFarlane.

== Central team ==
The director of the programme was Richard Fothergill. By April 1981 he had set up a small team of people, operating from offices at Cheviot House in Newcastle Polytechnic. John Anderson was appointed Deputy, and the rest of the central team consisted of Bob Coates, Helen Hindess, Mike Bostock and Lynn Craig later supported by Mike Page for Press and Media, Bill Broderick for International, and Alan Greenwell and Ralph Tabberer for Curriculum Development. The information collection and dissemination was carried out by the information officer who used an early form of Teletext (called Prestel) and email (called Telecom Gold) to disseminate news of materials and training opportunities. Each member of staff created correspondence (see Old Computers link below) on a handheld word processor, a Microwriter, designed by Cy Endfield.

== Strategy ==
Richard Fothergill published MEP's strategy in April 1981, having been appointed in the previous November. It had a number of innovative ideas in it, including a wide definition of its work covering computer aided learning, computer studies, microelectronics and information handling and a strong emphasis on regional collaboration. The aim of the programme was to help schools to prepare children for life in a society in which devices and systems based on microelectronics are commonplace and pervasive.

== Curriculum materials ==
Educational materials were initially devised by teachers for teachers, financed by the Department of Education and Science of England, Northern Ireland and Wales. It was common to see written on various books and leaflets that the aims of the programme were to 'promote, within the school curriculum, the study of microelectronics and its effects, and to encourage the use of the technology as an aid to teaching and learning'.

== DTI Computer Scheme ==
By 1982, the Department of Trade and Industry became involved and began to introduce computers in the secondary schools, later the primary schools. Teams of teachers, programmers and publishers worked hard to develop software to run on a variety of machines. The two most popular were Acorn Computers and Research Machines computers. The ZX Spectrum was used in a variety of situations, very often for control projects, such as teaching children how traffic lights worked.

== Regional structure ==
Fourteen regional information centres were set up around the UK to demonstrate materials to local teachers. There was one information officer, one director and a number of training coordinators per region.

The focus for the training was split into four 'domains':

1. the Computer as a Device (exploring and developing Computer Science as a subject);
2. Communications and Information Systems (looking at the electronic office and developing a Business Studies theme);
3. Electronics and Control Technology (developing devices and resources to support Science and Technology subjects); and
4. Computer Based Learning (looking and developing how uses of technology could support teaching and learning right through and across the whole curriculum).

== Primary Project ==
Originally conceived as a programme to develop secondary education, it was soon perceived that many primary schools were ready to adopt new methodologies. A National Primary Project was established, which developed a substantial amount of high class resources that were the basis for significant curriculum development. The young children, and many primary school teachers, were enthusiastic and used the computer as a tool. There was often only one computer per school, and it was on a trolley which could be moved to wherever it was required. Children were then familiar with it as a tool, a resource, not as an item which they might find at home, as is the case today. Richard Fothergill predicted the computer would become pervasive in society.

== Closure ==
The programme's closure was announced in June 1985 and a successor organisation the Microelectronics Education Support Unit was announced. The programme continued until 1986 and was formally evaluated by Her Majesty's Inspectorate in that year. HMI reported "The MEP years will be remembered by those directly involved, and by most of those on its periphery, as a time of creativity and fruitful development. There was a new found and remarkable enthusiasm for IT and its potential impact on all phases and many aspects of the curriculum." Whilst the Programme was running it attracted world attention and was highly commended.
