= Diana Francis (peace activist) =

British peace activist

Diana Francis (born 1944 in Lancashire) is a British peace activist, Quaker, and author.

She is a graduate of the University of Oxford, and has a Ph.D. from the University of Bath, earned in 1998 with the thesis Respect in cross-cultural conflict resolution training. She is a former president of the International Fellowship of Reconciliation and Chair of the Committee for Conflict Transformation Support, and was the 2015 Swarthmore Lecturer.

== Books ==
Francis is the author of:

- People, Peace and Power: Conflict transformation in action, London, Pluto Press, 2002 ISBN 0-7453-1835-5 (paperback) ISBN 0-7453-1836-3 (hardback)
- Rethinking War and Peace, London and Ann Arbor, MI, Pluto Press, Pluto Press, 2004 ISBN 0-7453-2187-9 (paperback) ISBN 0-7453-2188-7 (hardback)
- From Pacification to Peacebuilding: A Call to Global Transformation London and Ann Arbor, MI, Pluto Press (20 Mar 2010) ISBN 978-07453-3027-3 (hardback).
- Faith, Power and Peace: The 2015 Swarthmore Lecture, Quaker Books, 2015.

== See also ==
- List of peace activists
