= Edward Parkes =

British academic (1926–2019)

Sir Edward Walter Parkes DL FREng (19 May 1926 – 25 September 2019) was Vice-Chancellor of City University London from 1974 to 1978 and of the University of Leeds from 1983 to 1991.

== Life ==
Parkes was born in 1926.

Parkes attended King Edward's School, Birmingham, and St John's College, Cambridge, where he obtained a first class degree in mechanical engineering.

Other posts included Head of the Department of Engineering at Leicester University in the 1960s and Chairman of the UK University Grants Committee in the early 1980s. From 1989 to 1991 he was Chairman of the Committee of Vice-Chancellors and Principals. He was also appointed a Fellow of the Royal Academy of Engineering in 1982.

Edward and Margaret Parkes commissioned Leicester based architect James Gowan to design them a holiday home on land they had bought above St David's Cathedral in Wales. The resulting Round House was listed after it was completed in 1967.

Parkes was knighted in 1983. There is a portrait in oils by Michael Noakes at City University. Parkes died in September 2019 at the age of 93.

== Private life ==
He married the educationalist Margaret Parr (1925-2007) and they had two children. Lady Parkes CBE died in 2007 having changed the UK's educational system to include Design and Technology.

Academic offices
Preceded by Sir James Sharp Tait	Vice-Chancellor, City University, London; 1974–1978	Succeeded by Professor Raoul N. Franklin
Preceded by William Walsh (acting)	Vice-Chancellor, University of Leeds; 1983–1991	Succeeded by Alan Wilson
