= WMnet =

WMnet is the tag name for the West Midlands Regional Broadband Consortium, an association of local councils in the West Midlands of England created under the aegis of the Department for Education and Skills National Grid for Learning Programme in 2001.

== Overview ==
The West Midlands in the title of WMnet refers to an English region which stretches from the Peak District in the north down to the Wye and Severn valleys in the South; its Western boundary is the Welsh border and it incorporates most of the Welsh Marches in Shropshire and Herefordshire. To the East it stretches as far as Rugby, in Warwickshire and the M1 motorway. It contains some very substantial English cities in Stoke on Trent, Wolverhampton, Coventry and Birmingham. Its population of 5.5 million is slightly in excess of that of Scotland and about one-ninth of the English total. The West Midlands region is not to be confused with the smaller, West Midlands county.

== WMnet members ==
WMnet members are:

Birmingham City Council
Coventry City Council
Metropolitan Borough of Dudley
Herefordshire Council
Metropolitan Borough of Sandwell
Shropshire Council
Metropolitan Borough of Solihull
Staffordshire County Council
Stoke City Council
Telford and Wrekin
Metropolitan Borough of Walsall
Warwickshire County Council
Wolverhampton City Council
Worcestershire County Council

(Originally the Regional Development Agency, Advantage West Midlands, played an active role in WMnet affairs, but that has ceased to be the case.)

The name WMnet was invented by Roger Blamire, because there is little else that can be done with the letters W and M. One unfortunate consequence is that even the participants have never agreed on a pronunciation. For reasons that have never been satisfactorily explained, WMnet was not funded like the most other English regions in 2000, which saw RBCs created in all the English regions bar London, the West Midlands and the Bristol area.
