= University Grants Committee (United Kingdom) =

University Grants Committee was an advisory committee of the British government, which advised on the distribution of grant funding amongst the British universities. It was in existence from 1919 until 1989. Its functions have now largely been taken over by the higher education funding councils (OfS and UKRI in England, SFC in Scotland, HEFCW in Wales, and Department for the Economy in Northern Ireland).

== History ==
The creation of the UGC was first proposed in 1904 in the report of a committee chaired by R. B. Haldane. The UGC was eventually created in 1918, to address a need for a mechanism to channel funds to universities, which had since 1889 received direct Treasury grants, but had suffered from neglect and lack of funding during the First World War. The UGC's role at this time was to examine the financial needs of the universities and to advise on grants, but it did not have a remit to plan for the development of universities. This situation changed after the Second World War, when the Barlow Report of 1946 recommended that the UGC take on a planning role for the university sector, to ensure that universities were adequate for national needs during post-war reconstruction. The Education Act 1944 had also aimed to increase the number of school leavers qualified to enter higher education, necessitating a period of expansion for the universities, that needed planning by the UGC.

During the post-war years, the UGC continued to have a strategic role in the development of the university sector, acting as a buffer between government and the interests of the universities. In 1964 responsibility for the UGC was transferred from HM Treasury to the newly constituted Department of Education and Science. The UGC had its own premises in Park Crescent, London.

In the early 1980s the chairman was Edward Parkes, who oversaw cuts in university funding. Parkes was succeeded by Peter Swinnerton-Dyer, under whose chairmanship the UGC conducted its first "Research Selectivity Exercise" in 1986. This decided the disbursement of funds for University research, and was a precursor to the Research Assessment Exercise and the Research Excellence Framework.

The UGC was wound up on 1 April 1989, with its powers transferred to a new body, the Universities Funding Council, which was directly responsible to Parliament; the UFC was then split in 1992 between three Higher Education Funding Councils.

== List of chairmen ==
- Sir William Symington McCormick (1911/1919–1930)
- Sir Walter Riddell, Bt. (1930–1934)
- Sir Walter Hamilton Moberly (1934–1949)
- Sir A. E. Trueman (1949–?)
- Sir Keith Murray (1952–?)
- Sir William Symington McCormick
- Sir John Wolfenden (1963–1968)
- Sir Kenneth Berrill (1969–1973)
- Sir Frederick Dainton (1973–1978?)
- Sir Edward Parkes
- Sir Peter Swinnerton-Dyer, Bt.
