= Self-review framework =

The Self-review Framework is an online tool that schools in the United Kingdom can use to assess and benchmark their use of technology (ICT). It enables schools to identify where they are and shows the practical steps they can take to improve their use of technology. The Self-review Framework provides a structure for reviewing a school's use of technology and its impact on school improvement. It is designed to support ALL schools. It complements the work schools currently undertake for Ofsted and can be provided as evidence for a school's Self Evaluation Framework (SEF).

It was originally developed by Becta and has now been transferred fully to Naace, who continue to provide support for the Self-review Framework and the related ICT Mark.

== Background ==
The Self-review Framework was the result of collaboration between Becta, Ofsted, the Qualifications and Curriculum Development Agency, the Training and Development Agency (TDA), the National College for School Leadership (NCSL), the National Strategies, the Specialist Schools and Academies Trust (SSAT) and Naace, with advice and guidance from a wider range of partners and stakeholders.

Following Becta's closure in April 2011, the Self-review Framework was one of the functions transferred into the Department for Education. It continues to be run by Naace, the National Association for all those who wish to advance education through the use of technology.

== Elements ==
The six parts of the self-review framework give a summary of the school's current ICT capabilities and suggest actions to improve ICT use:

- Leadership and management
- Teaching and Learning with Technology
- Assessment of Digital Capability
- Digital Safeguarding
- Professional Development
- Resources and Technology

Formulated in partnership with the National College for School Leadership, leadership and management elements supports and challenge schools to:

- develop and communicate a shared vision for ICT
- plan a sustainable ICT strategy
- develop an effective information management strategy

Formulated in partnership with the National Strategies, planning elements support and challenge schools to:

- plan for the development of pupils’ ICT capability
- plan the use of technology to support the curriculum and can respond to new technologies
- ensure pupils’ ICT experiences are progressive, coherent, balanced and consistent
- identify and evaluate the impact of technology on learning and teaching

Formulated by Becta, the learning elements support and challenge schools to:

- plan the use of technology to enhance learning and teaching.
- meet pupils’ expectations for the use of technology
- consider the impact of technology on learning

Formulated in partnership with the Qualifications and Curriculum Authority, the assessment elements support and challenge schools to:

- assess ICT capability of pupils’ to support their learning.
- use assessment evidence and data in planning learning and teaching across the whole curriculum.
- assess the learning in specific subjects when ICT has been used.

Formulated in partnership with the Training and Development Agency for Schools, the professional development elements support and challenge schools to:

- identify and address the ICT training needs of your school and individual staff
- provide quality support and training activities for all staff in the use of ICT and sharing effective practice
- review, monitor and evaluate professional development

Formulated by Becta, the resources element supports and challenges schools to:

- ensure learning and teaching environments use technology effectively and in line with strategic needs
- purchase, deploy and review appropriate use of technology resources that reflect your school improvement strategy
- manage technical support effectively for the benefit of pupils and staff

== NaaceMark ==
Formally known as the ICT Mark, the NaaceMark is a nationally recognised quality accreditation that schools can achieve once they reach a certain level of maturity and have completed the commentary sections in the online Self-review Framework tool. The NaaceMark recognises good practice in all areas of the use of technology across the school curriculum and management. The accreditation celebrates the considerable achievement of schools that have developed their use of technology to support learning to represent solid good practice.

Originally accredited by Becta, on the demise of that organisation in 2011, responsibility of the ICT Mark passed to Naace (until 2006, named the National Association of Advisers For Computers in Education).
