= Microelectronics Education Support Unit =

- Abbreviation: MESU
- Merged into: Council for Educational Technology
- Formation: c. 1985
- Dissolved: 1988
- Purpose: Information technology advising
- Region served: United Kingdom

The Microelectronics Education Support Unit (MESU) was an organization in the United Kingdom that provided professional support about educational technology. It was announced in 1985, but was merged in 1988 to form the National Council for Educational Technology.

== Origins and Purpose ==
The Microelectronic Education Support Unit (MESU) was announced in July 1985 as a follow on to the Microelectronics Education Programme however it did not become operational until January 1987.

== Staff ==
MESU was set up by its newly appointed Director John Foster at the Warwick University Science Park. He appointed Ralph Tabberer and Ann Irving as Deputy Directors and they recruited a strong team of curriculum and information specialists. It set about identifying local authority needs and linking into subject associations.

== Supporting Advisory Teachers ==
In 1988 the Department for Education and Science (DES) set up the Information Technology in Schools (ITIS) initiative to oversee this area, headed by Phillip Lewis and supported by David Noble. It funded the deployment of 600 advisory teachers and the provision of hardware in schools through the payment of Education Support Grants (ESGs) to local authorities. Grants were made conditional on each LEA producing a policy statement and a five-year plan. MESU ran separate national conferences for the different subject advisory teachers, Mathematics, English, Science, Design and Technology and others. pulling together a resource pack for each to provide each with support in their local authority work. Some of National Curriculum History

== National Curriculum ==
Following legislation in 1988 schools had become more autonomous in making their own purchasing and staffing decisions. Of substantial importance was the inclusion of IT as a key component of the national curriculum for every student aged 5 to 16. This identified for the first time a core set of IT capabilities and stressed applying them across the curriculum.

== Merger with CET to form NCET ==
In 1988 MESU was merged with the CET by the DES, who funded both bodies, to form the National Council for Educational Technology.
