= Margaret Parkes =

British educationist

- Born: 26 September 1925; Seaton
- Died: 23 August 2007 (aged 81); Oxford

Margaret Parkes CBE later Lady Parkes born Margaret Parr (26 September 1925 – 23 August 2007) was a British educationist. She led the development of the new educational subject of "Design and Technology"

== Life ==
Parkes was born in Seaton in 1925. She was the first child born to Dorothy Ann (born Roberts) and John Parkes. Her parents were both teachers. In time she would have two sisters. Her father became a headmaster in Cambridgeshire and he was then involved in developing the Impington Village College.

Parkes was a nurse during the early part of the second world war after completing her education at Perse School for Girls. She then moved to Leicester ro train as a teacher at Leicester College of Domestic Science.

Margaret Parkes and her husband commissioned Leicester based architect James Gowan to design them a holiday home on land they had bought above St David's Cathedral in Wales. The resulting Round House was, in time, listed after it was completed in 1967.

Parkes was the founding chair of the design and technology working group for the national curriculum in 1988 by Kenneth Baker. Their report in June 1989 rolled together the subjects of craft, art, design, business studies, and information technology to create a new subject of "Design and Technology". The new subject aspired to re-energise the teaching of practical subjects in Britain with the objective of doing the same to the economy.

Of all the working groups it was Parkes' working party's work that was enthusiastically received with quotes of "revolutionary" and "inspiring". The new compulsory subject was introduced the following year and the applause eased. The new adjectives included "disastrous" and "demoralising". Parkes served until 1999.

Parkes died in Oxford in 2009 having led the introduction of craft, design and technology into the National Curriculum.

== Private life ==
She married Edward Parkes and they had two children.
