= Universities Funding Council =

The Universities Funding Council (UFC) was a UK body established under the Education Reform Act 1988 replacing the University Grants Committee. It distributed funds provided by central government to universities for the provision of education and the undertaking of research.

It was wound up by the Further and Higher Education Act 1992 which replaced its function by the Higher Education Funding Council for England, the Higher Education Funding Council for Wales and the Scottish Higher Education Funding Council (now the Scottish Funding Council).

The decision of the Universities Funding Council (as it then was), published on the 17th December 1992, to place the University of London's Institute of Dental Surgery at level 2 in its assessment of the quality of institutional research, was challenged by judicial review in the case of R. v. Universities Funding Council ex parte The Institute of Dental Surgery in 1993.

== See also ==
- Department for Employment and Learning, which funds universities in Northern Ireland
