= Jack Minnis (footballer) =

Australian rules footballer

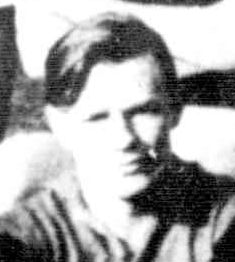

Personal information
- Full name: John Edward Minnis
- Born: 26 January 1922; South Brisbane, Queensland
- Died: 6 February 1975 (aged 53); Ringwood East, Victoria
- Original team: Xavier College

Playing career^{1}
Years	Club	Games (Goals)
1942–44	Melbourne	25 (6)
- ^{1} Playing statistics correct to the end of 1944.

John Edward Minnis (26 January 1922 – 6 February 1975) was an Australian rules footballer who played with Melbourne in the Victorian Football League (VFL).
