= Helen Minnis =

Researcher

- Education: University of Glasgow; London School of Hygiene & Tropical Medicine
- Known for: Child and Adolescent Psychiatry
- Scientific career
- Workplaces: University of Glasgow; Maudsley Hospital

Helen Minnis is a Professor of Child and Adolescent Psychiatry at the University of Glasgow. She studies reactive attachment disorder and other developmental conditions.

== Early life and education ==
Minnis earned a bachelor's degree in biochemistry at the University of Glasgow in 1985. She remained there for her medical studies and completed a bachelor of medicine, bachelor of surgery in 1988. In the 1990s Minnis worked as a doctor in an orphanage in Guatemala. Here she worked with children that had been abused and neglected. It was whilst she was in Guatemala that she became interested in attachment disorder. She noticed that children in orphanages would cling to visitors, whilst children in nearby villages hid from strangers. When she returned to Glasgow she noticed that children there were suffering from similar conditions; which she attributed to neglect. She moved to the Maudsley Hospital, where she trained in psychiatry and focussed her research on children with reactive attachment disorder. She was awarded a Wellcome Trust Clinical Fellowship to work at the Institute of Psychiatry Social, Genetic and Developmental Research Centre from 1995 to 1999. In 1996 she was award a master's degree in epidemiology at the London School of Hygiene & Tropical Medicine. She earned a PhD in child and adolescent psychiatry in 1998.

== Research and career ==
Her research today considers the clinical aspects and behavioural genetics of attachment disorder. She completed her psychiatric training in the University of the West of Scotland before joining the University of Glasgow as a lecturer in 2003. Minnis has studied the mental health of adopted children in Scotland. She found that nurturing parents were incredibly important in a child's psychological development. She has shown that children who suffer from early neglect sometimes have problems with their frontal lobe. In Glasgow she has been piloting the New Orleans Intervention Model, which provides attachment-based assessments for the caregiving relationships of children under five. The process takes a few months, including intensive trials of treatment to improve the relationships of people in their homes. She is Chief Investigator of the BeST^{?} randomised controlled trial that compared the New Orleans Intervention Model with social work services. She has been involved with the Scottish Government Scottish Attachment in Action which looks to train and support people about the importance of attachment relationships. She has investigated how reactive attachment disorder impacts other developmental disorders, including autism spectrum disorder.

Minnis is part of the Autism Innovative Medicine Studies-2-Trials that studies the biology and development of autism in an effort to inform new treatments. Minnis is a member of the United Kingdom's Black Female Professors Forum. She delivered a TEDx talk Lead by admitting you don't know where she spoke about attachment theory and family relationships. In 2011 she was elected a Fellow of the Royal College of Psychiatrists and Fellow of the Academy of Medical Sciences in 2022.

=== Selected publications ===
- Minnis, Helen (2006). "Children in foster care: Mental health, service use and costs". European Child & Adolescent Psychiatry. 15 (2): 63–70. doi:10.1007/s00787-006-0452-8. PMID 16523249. S2CID 29317644.
- Minnis, Helen (2017). Christopher Gillberg, Encyclopedia of Autism Spectrum Disorders. Springer.
- Minnis, Helen (2012). Attachment and loss in childhood and beyond. Pearson Longman. pp. 223–233. ISBN 9781408237250.
