= Hwb =

Welsh educational website

- Website type: Virtual learning environment, Educational technology
- Available in: Welsh, English
- Owner: Welsh Government
- Creator: Department for Education and Skills
- Website: hwb.gov.wales
- Commercial: No
- Launched: December 2012; 13 years ago
- Current status: Active

Hwb is a website and collection of online tools provided to all schools in Wales by the Welsh Government. It was created in response to the 'Find it, Make it, Use it, Share it' report into Digital Learning in Wales.

Hwb provides access to tools such as Microsoft Office 365, Google Classroom, J2e, and Adobe Express all free to students in Wales.

The main site contains over 88,000 bilingual resources that were transferred from NGfL Cymru. In addition teachers and learners with accounts can sign in and access a range of other online tools and resources. Included in this is a school specific Learning Platform (Hwb+).
