= Becta =

Organization

British Educational Communications Technology Agency
- Abbreviation: Becta
- Formation: 1998
- Dissolved: dissolved 2011
- Type: Non-departmental government organisation, charitable limited company
- Purpose: Promotion and integration of ICT in education
- Location: Millburn Hill Road, Canley, Coventry, UK in the University of Warwick Science Park
- Region served: UK
- Chief Executives: Owen Lynch, Stephen Crowne

Becta, originally known as the British Educational Communications and Technology Agency, was a non-departmental public body (popularly known as a Quango) funded by the Department for Education and its predecessor departments, in the United Kingdom. It was a charity and a company limited by guarantee. The abolition of Becta was announced in the May 2010 post-election spending review. Government funding was discontinued in March 2011. Becta went into liquidation in April 2011.

== Role ==
Becta was the lead agency in the United Kingdom for the promotion and integration of information and communications technology (ICT) in education. Becta was a company limited by guarantee with charitable status. It was established in 1998 through the reconstitution of the National Council for Educational Technology (NCET), which oversaw the procurement of all ICT equipment and e-learning strategy for schools.

== Policy ==
Foremost among the 2005–2008 Becta strategic objectives were "to influence strategic direction and development of national education policy to best take advantage of technology" and "to develop a national digital infrastructure and resources strategy leading to greater national coherence."

== National Grid for Learning ==
The National Grid for Learning (NGfL) was managed by Becta and was set up as a gateway to educational resources to support schools and colleges across the UK. The NGfL portal was launched in November 1998, as one of several new programmes initiated by the new Labour government which took office in May 1997 and had a linked budget of earmarked funds to be spent on schools' internet connections and ICT.

== Purchasing Frameworks ==
Becta awarded certain vendors placement on approved "purchasing frameworks":

The frameworks are awarded in accordance with EU procurement legislation... against a range of criteria based around quality of provision and service, and against the extent to which they meet the requirements of the functional and technical specifications – specifications that have been developed in conjunction with all stakeholders, including members of the open source community...

The purchasing frameworks were criticised as being outdated, and for effectively denying schools the option of benefiting from both free and open source and the value and experience of small and medium ICT companies. Participating companies had to have a net worth of at least £700,000 to qualify and had to satisfy a list of functional requirements. A concern was raised about the "over-comfortable relationship the government has with some of the bigger players."

In January 2007, Crispin Weston, who had helped Becta draw up the criteria used to select suppliers, asked the EC Competition Commission to investigate his allegation that a significant number of the successful tenders had failed to implement the mandatory functional requirements, including particular aspects of inter-operability. He also added in his letter to the Commission that they should take action on the further issue of:

[T]he insistence that many different categories of software within a particular school or Local Authority should all be supplied by a single supplier [which] has serious anti-competitive implications."

== See also ==
- Self-review framework
