= National Grid for Learning =

The National Grid for Learning (NGfL) was a UK government-funded gateway to educational resources on the Internet. It provided a curated collection of links to resources and materials of high quality. The NGfL was established to support schools in England, while separate grids were created for schools in Northern Ireland, Scotland, and Wales.

The NGfL portal was launched in November 1998 as part of the DfES National Grid for Learning strategy. This programme aimed to enhance the use of information and communications technology (ICT) by learners and educators in the United Kingdom. It was among several new programmes introduced by the Labour government, which assumed office in May 1997, and had a dedicated budget allocated for schools' internet connections and ICT. The portal was funded and managed by Becta (British Educational Communications and Technology Agency), the government's leading agency for ICT in education.

Regional Broadband Consortia (RBCs) were created in 2000 under the auspices of what was at the time the Department for Education and Skills, (DfES) to secure lower prices for broadband connections and services for schools by aggregating demand across a region and entering into region wide contracts. Since then, these consortia have expanded their remit and have taken over some of the original aims of the NGfL.

On 13 April 2006, Becta closed the National Grid for Learning portal, stating that it was "improving its offer to teachers by rationalising the number of different services it provides for schools and teaching staff". According to the agency, "this is being achieved by integrating valued components of the NGfL into its existing services".

The concept of the NGfL lives on, however. The RBCs have worked collaboratively since 2001, and have since been actively joined in their partnership by equivalent organizations in Northern Ireland (C2kNI), Scotland (Glow) and Wales (NGfL Cymru) to form the national education network (NEN), utilizing the JANET network to provide a single, secure private network available to provide shared resources amongst all UK schools.

In 2019, London Grid for Learning bought the "National Grid for Learning" trademark as part of its plan to expand broadband connectivity for schools and public authorities.

== See also ==
- London Grid for Learning
- Regional Broadband Consortium
