= Antonio Baratti =

Italian engraver, etcher and printmaker

- Portrait of St. Gerolamo Emiliani, engraved by Baratti after Giovanni Battista Piazzetta
- Born: 7 January 1724; Florence, Grand Duchy of Tuscany
- Died: 28 July 1787 (aged 63); Venice, Republic of Venice
- Education: Joseph Wagner
- Known for: Engraving

Antonio Baratti (or Baratta; 7 January 1724 – 28 July 1787) was an Italian engraver, etcher and printmaker.

== Biography ==
Antonio Baratti was born in Florence on 7 January 1724. He was educated in the workshop of Joseph Wagner in Venice, together with Fabio Berardi and Francesco Bartolozzi. In 1759, he succeeded Giuliano Giampiccoli as the head of the Remondini workshop at Bassano del Grappa. After marrying Valentina Monaco he opened his own workshop in which he was supported by his wife and his three sons, Domenico, Tommaso (or Tomaso) and Pietro and soon also by the pupils Antonio Sandi and Giuseppe Daniotto.

Gifted with considerable technical ability, Baraldi had a part in illustrating a great number of costly publications, mostly Venetian. He engraved almost one thousand plates for the Livorno edition of the Encyclopédie (1770–79), the 28-volumes of Pietro Metastasio's opera omnia (1781–82) and the 17-volume collection of Carlo Goldoni's works, (1760–64). His most famous prints are the four sheets illustrating the celebrations held in Venice in 1782 to honour the visit of the Grand Duke Paul and Grand Duchess Maria Feodorovna of Russia. He collaborated with other artists on the Via Crucis published by Wagner in 1779, engraved numerous portraits of artists and scholars and also executed about 140 religious subjects after Guido Reni, Paolo Veronese, Giovanni Battista Piazzetta and Francesco Vanni, genre subjects after Giorgio Giacoboni (1739–1777) and landscapes after Paolo Monaldi. Baratti died in Venice on 28 July 1787.

== Selected works ==
- 121 plates for the Italian edition Dizionario mitologico by André Declaustre, Venice: Domenico Ferrarin, 1755–1758, vol. 1 (1755), 2 (1755), 3 (1758)
- 4 plates after works by Paolo Veronese, Francesco Vanni, Guido Reni and Onorio Marinari for the Raccolta di ottanta stampe rappresentanti i quadri più scelti dei SS. Marchesi Gerini di Firenze, Florence, 1786
- 997 plates for the 33-volume Livorno edition of the Encyclopédie, 1770–1779
- portrait of Giambettino Cignaroli drawn by his nephew Saverio Dalla Rosa in the biography Bevilacqua, Ippolito (1771), Memorie della vita di Giambettino Cignaroli, eccellente dipintor veronese (in Italian), Illustrator: Antonio Baratti, Verona: Stamperia Moroni, OCLC 78419496, Wikidata Q54139661

Works by his son Tommaso:

- 5 plates for Orlando Furioso by Lodovico Ariosto, Venice: Antonio Zatta, 1772

== Gallery ==
Ruins in the ancient Geeek city of Paestum, engraved by Baratti after Antonio Dominici, 1784

Madonna and Child, engraved by Baratti after Onorio Marinari, 1768

Saint Joseph with the Christ Child, engraved by Baratti after Guido Reni, 1768

Knight in parade armour, engraved by Baratti after Ennemond Alexandre Petitot, 1769

Nighttime view of St. Mark's Square decorated for the 1782 visit of the Grand Duke and Grand Duchess of Russia

Nighttime view of St. Mark's Square decorated for the 1782 visit of the Grand Duke and Grand Duchess of Russia

Triumphal Arch erected in St. Mark's Square for the 1782 visit of the Grand Duke and Grand Duchess of Russia

Allegory of the Arts, titlepage for Scipione Carteromaco's Ricciardetto, engraved by Baratti after Pietro Antonio Novelli, 1738
