= Montegufoni Castle =

Castle in Montespertoli, Italy

- Castello di Montegufoni
- Montespertoli, Tuscany, Italy
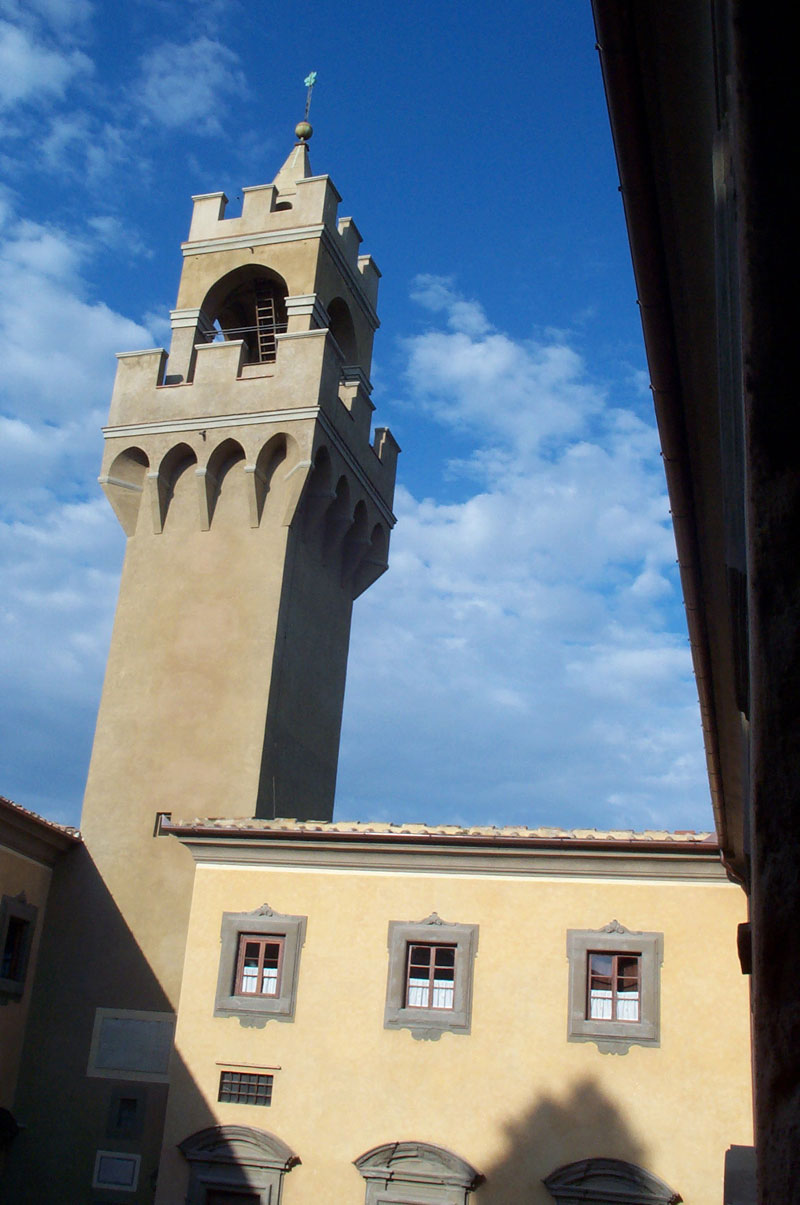
- Montegufoni Castle

Site information
- Type: Castle

Location
- Location in Italy
- Coordinates: 43°40′13.08″N 11°05′23.64″E

Site history
- Built: 13th century

Montegufoni Castle (Italian: Castello di Montegufoni) is a castle located in Montespertoli, a comune in the Metropolitan City of Florence in the Italian region Tuscany, located about 20 kilometres (12 mi) southwest of Florence. Montegufoni stands on the ancient Via Volterrana, the road taken by Charlemagne and other emperors to reach Florence or Rome and which passes through Volterra and Siena.

== History ==
The castle's exact creation date is unknown, but the first structure was probably built there during the 10th or 11th centuries. The first Lords of Montegufoni were the Ormannis, a noble family who built the first castle. In 1135, the Florentines attacked the castle, attempting to raze it to the ground.

=== Acciaioli family ===
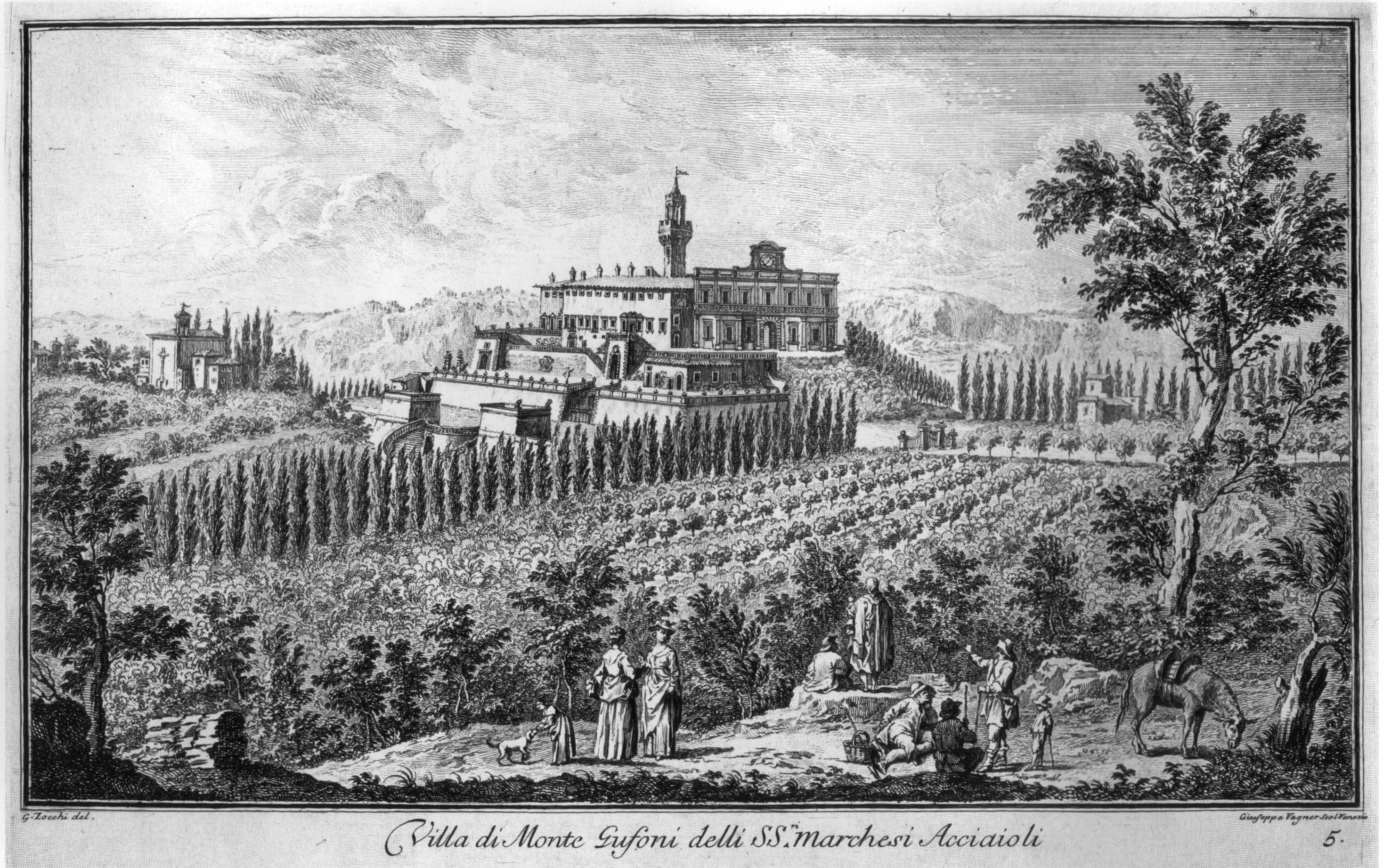
Engraving of the Villa di Monte Gufoni, home of the Marquises Acciaioli, by Giuseppe Zocchi and Joseph Wagner, 1744

The building was left in ruins until the 13th century, when it became the property of Gugliarello Acciaioli of the Acciaioli family. His descendants became enormously rich thanks to the bank they owned (Italian: Compagna di Ser Leone degli Acciaioli e de' suoi consorti) and towards the end of the 13th century, Montegufoni had been transformed into a complex comprising the central castle and seven smaller buildings, surrounded by walls: the so-called "seven old villas of the ancestral castle of Montegufoni", mentioned in an inscription in the castle.

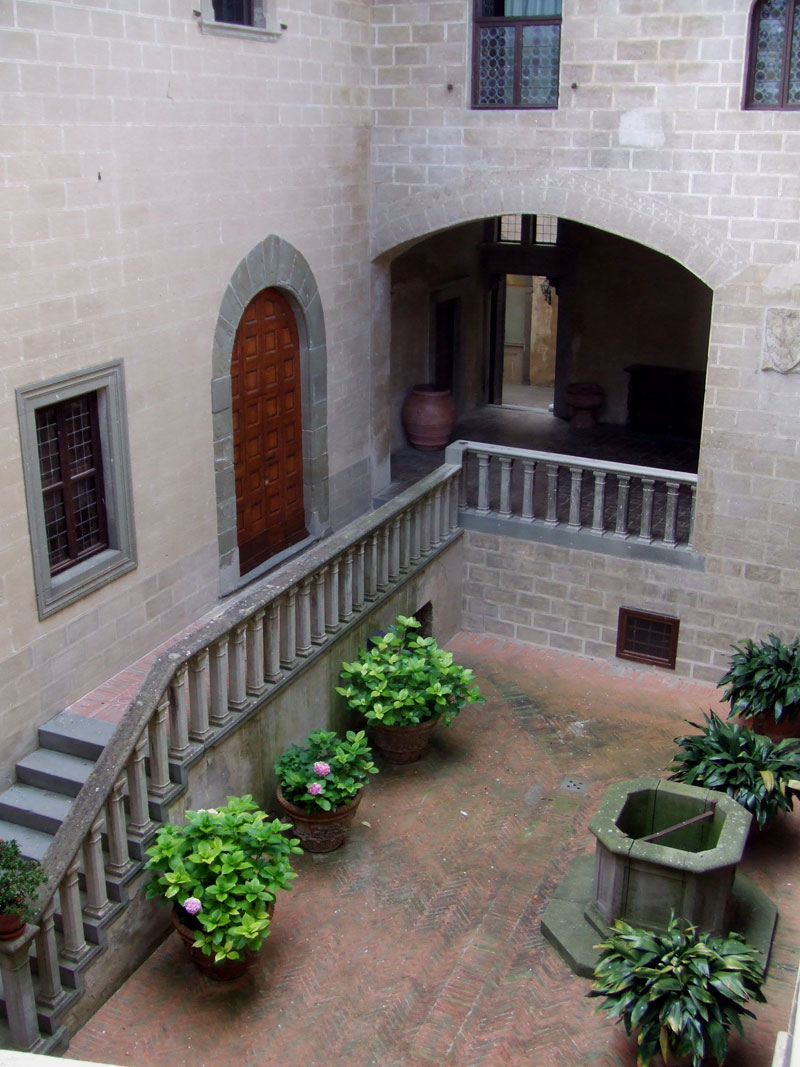
Courtyard of the Dukes, July 2005

In 1310, Niccolò Acciaiuoli was born at the castle, in a hall of the castle later transformed into a chapel. He later became Grand seneschal of the Kingdom of Naples and a dear friend of Boccaccio and Petrarch. In 1348, the King of Naples, Louis of Taranto, banished from his kingdom following the conflict with the King of Hungary, took refuge with his prime minister in Montegufoni. He used to banquet with the Bishop Angelo Acciaiuoli in the Banquet Hall (today known as "the Theatre"), which overlooks the part of the castle today called "Courtyard of the Dukes".

In 1386, Donato Acciaioli, a man who held the titles of Duke of Athens, Senator of Rome and Gonfaloniere of the Republic of Florence, built the tower that still dominates the castle today. In 1396 Donato was banished from Florence, but his assets (including Montegufoni) were saved from confiscation by his brother the cardinal. Donato's three sons resided at the Court of Athens until one of them, Agnolo di Jacopo, returned to Montegufoni with his son (Duke Francesco) and his cousin (it was probably at that time that the name "Court of the Dukes" was born).

In 1546, another Donato restored the tower on the model of Arnolfo's Tower of the Palazzo Vecchio in Florence and built the armory (today called the "La Galleria") and in this period Montegufoni became the meeting point of many Florentine artists. In 1612 Cosimo II de' Medici was invited to Montegufoni. Around 1650 Donato, with his wife Anna Maria Altoviti, restored the entire castle, giving it the appearance it still has today, connecting the seven buildings that until then had been separate. The castle continued to be one of the most famous meeting places of Florentine high society throughout the 17th century and also during the 18th, until the economic decline of the Acciaioli family, who sold it to the Baracchi family.

=== Sitwell family ===
In 1909 Sir George Sitwell, 4th Baronet, an eccentric Englishman, fell in love with the derelict castle at Montegufoni and decided to buy it in the name of his son Sir Osbert Sitwell, later the 5th Baronet. After becoming its owner, Sitwell began to enrich and embellish the castle. In 1921 he hired Italian futurist Gino Severini to decorate the castle, who created a series of masks and harlequins in one room called "La Sala delle Maschere" (The room of masks). Severini also painted an owl in other frescoes dotted around the castle, including a Commedia dell'Arte scene.

During World War II, to avoid them being stolen or damaged, 261 works of art, including the Adoration of the Magi by Domenico Ghirlandaio, the Primavera by Sandro Botticelli and the Ognissanti Madonna by Giotto were hidden in Montegufoni, as in many other places scattered throughout the Tuscan countryside, thanks to the work of people such as Giovanni Poggi, an official of the Fine Arts and director of the Uffizi, and Cesare Fasola, but also of ordinary citizens.

The Sitwell family made the castle an important cultural centre, inviting artists, especially American and English. In 1966, Sir Osbert, who had become a famous British author, settled permanently at the castle, often living there with his partner, the novelist David Stuart Horner. Struck by Parkinson's disease, he died at the castle in 1969. In 1972, Sir Osbert's nephew, Sir Reresby Sitwell, 7th Baronet, sold the castle to Sergio Posarelli.

=== Current use ===
After acquiring the castle in 1972, Posarelli again restored it, turning Montegufoni Castle into a luxurious holiday destination. After Posarelli's death in 2013, the castle passed to his three children: Cosimo, Guido and Lisa Posarelli.

The castle, like many places in Tuscany, has been transformed, divided into apartments and is today used mainly for ceremonies and conferences.

The Castle's Church of San Lorenzo contains a fresco by Giovanni Domenico Ferretti, a Rococo painter of the Florentine school; a painted crucifix by Taddeo Gaddi; the Madonna and Child (Italian: Madonna col Bambino) from the workshop of Lippo di Benivieni, dating from the Trecento, is now preserved at the Museo di Arte Sacra in Montespertoli.

=== Gallery ===
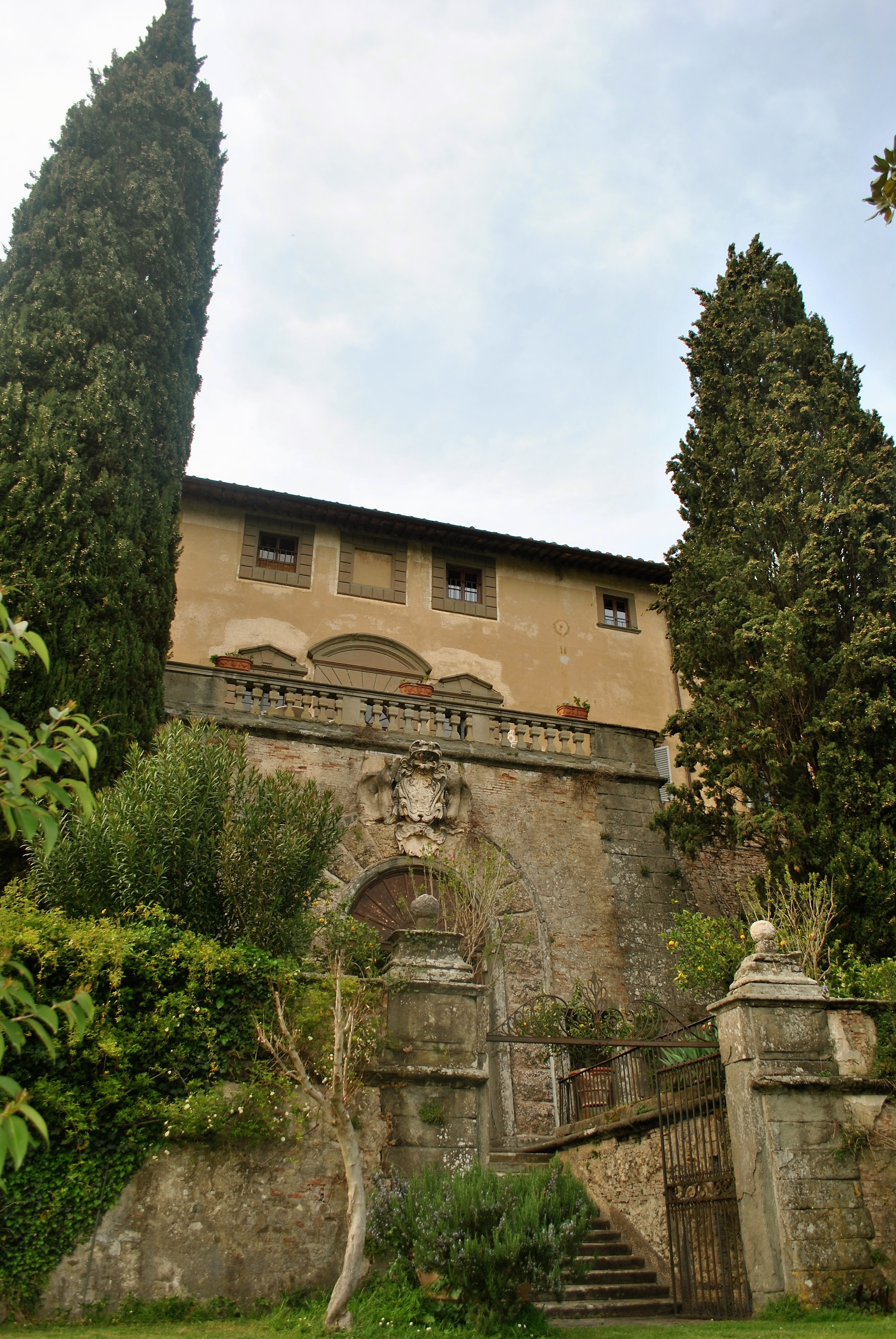
April 2016

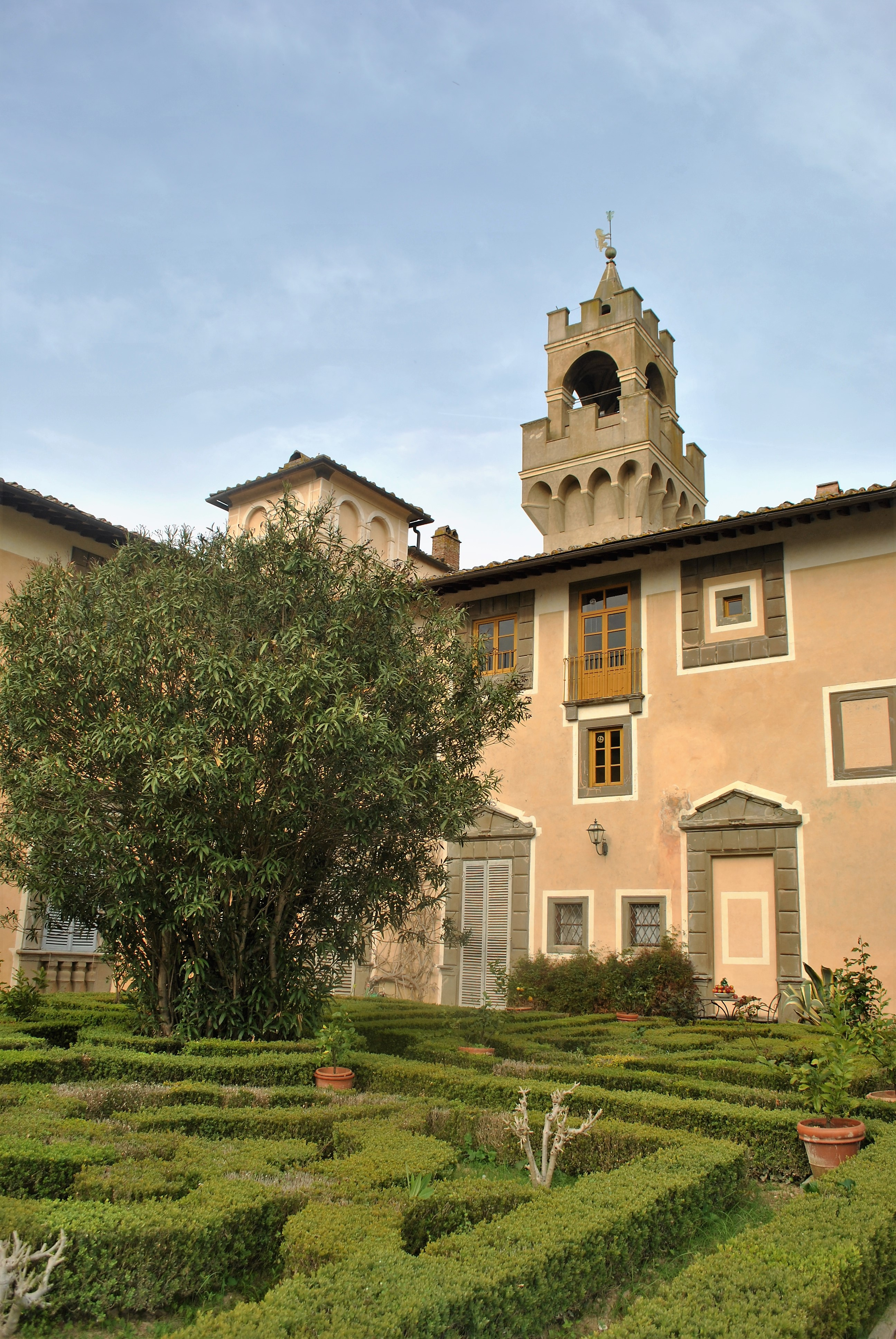
Courtyard, April 2016

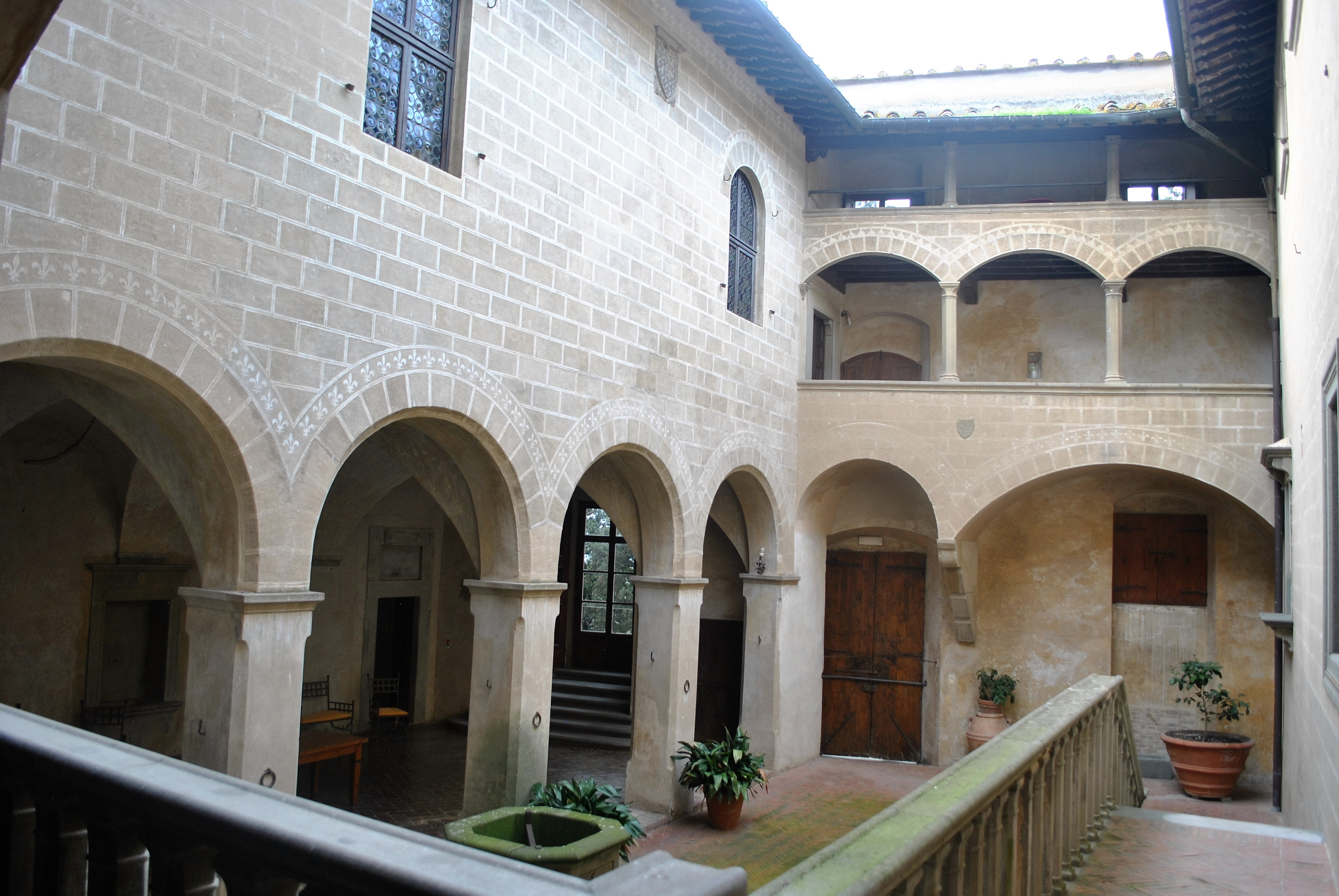
April 2016

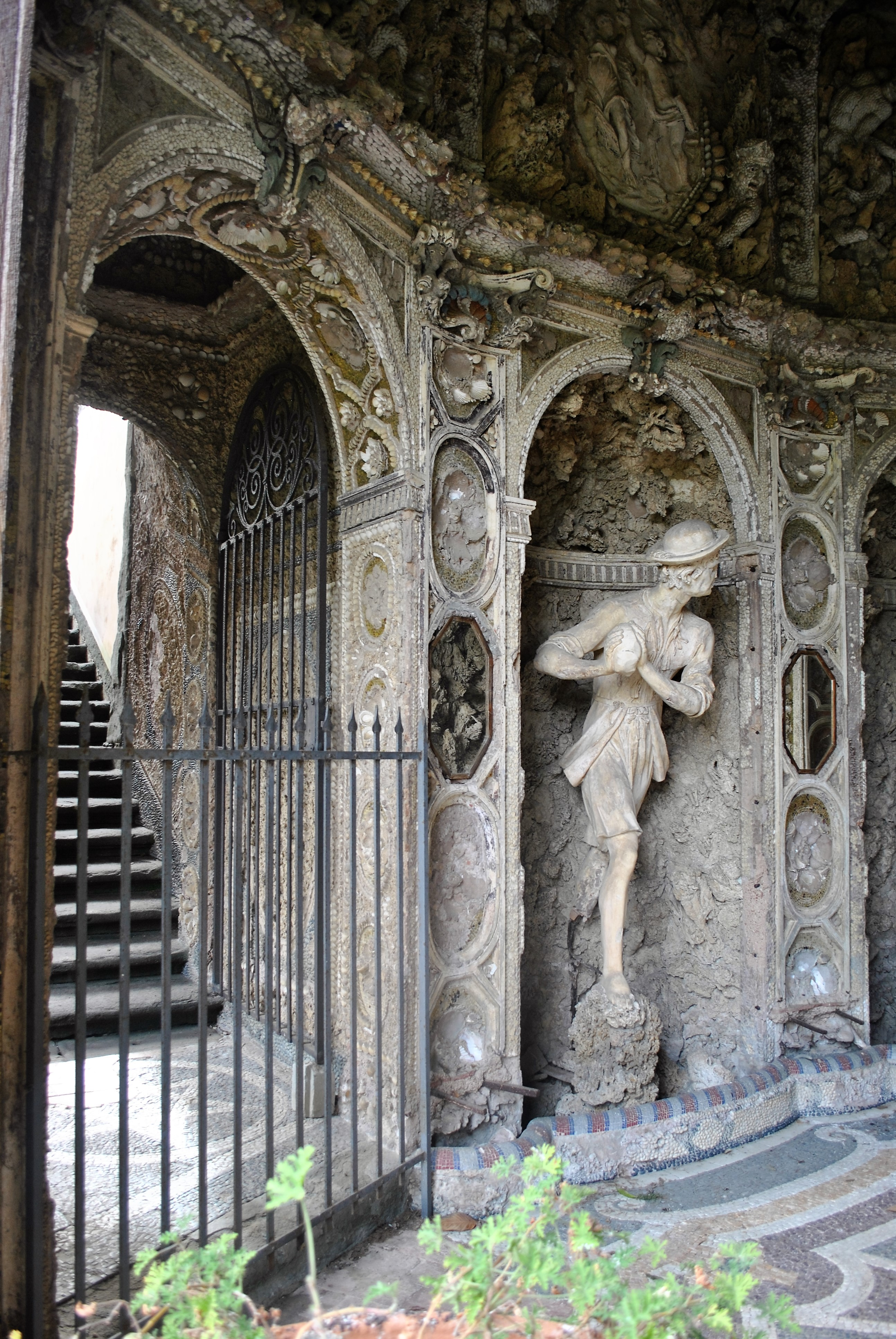
Grotto, April 2016

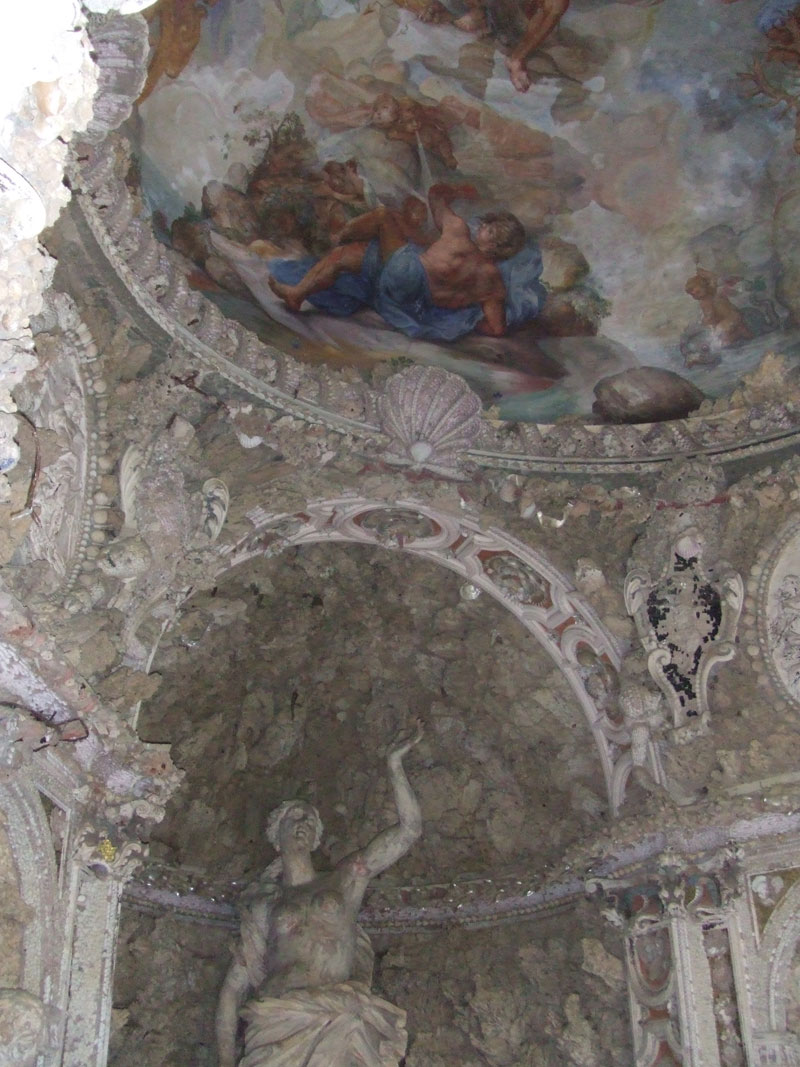
Fresco in the grotto, July 2005

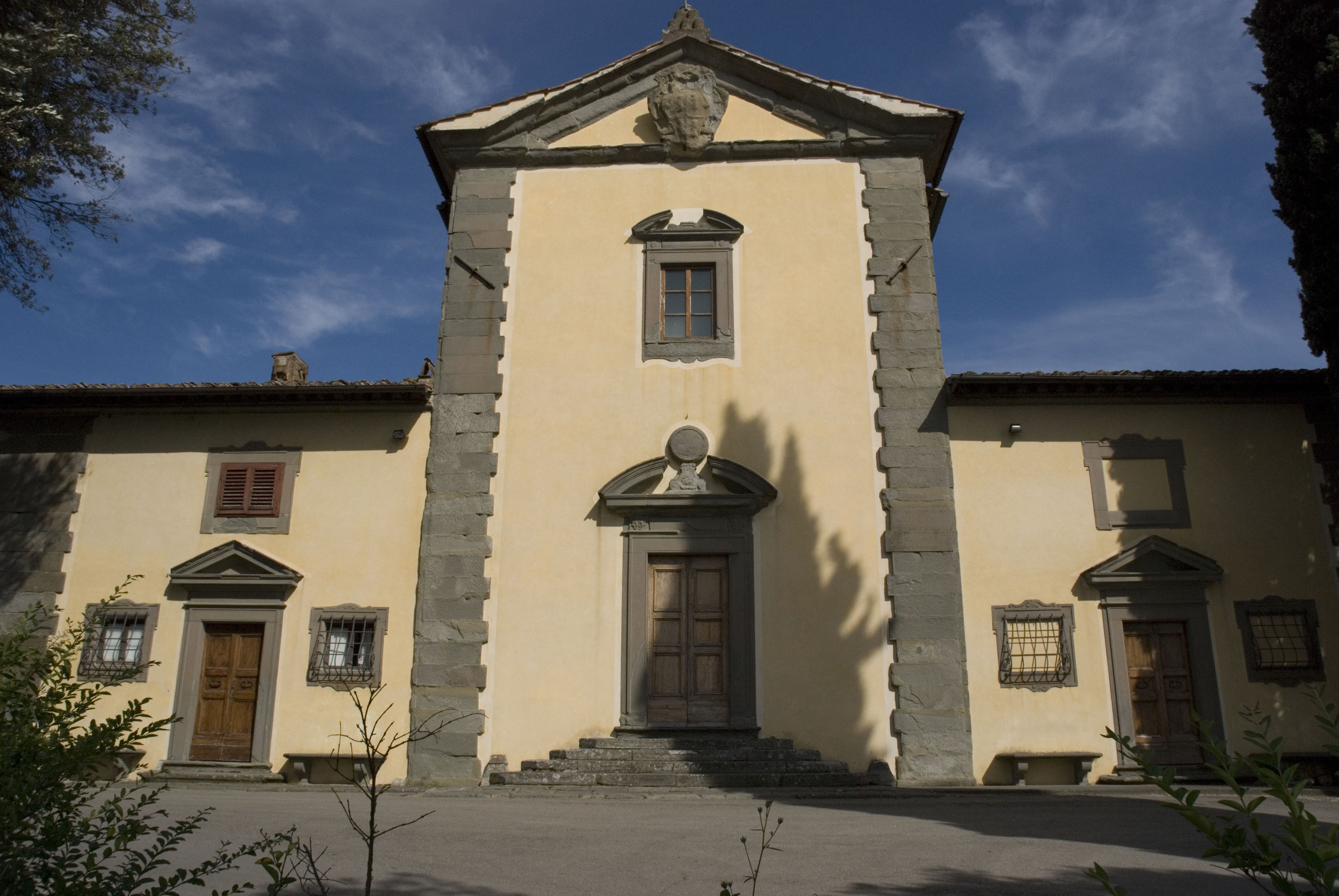
Church of San Lorenzo, June 2007
