= Remondini =

Remondini is an Italian surname, and may refer to:

- Remondini (firm), a firm of Italian print publishers run by a family of that name
- Leandro Remondini (1917–1979), Italian footballer and manager

== See also ==
- Peter Remondino (1846–1926), Italian-American physician
- Fabrizio Romondini (born 1977), Italian football coach and former player
