= Jean Flipart =

Jean Flipart may refer to:

- Jean Charles Flipart, French engraver
- Jean Jacques Flipart, his son, French engraver
