= Innocenzo Conti =

Italian cardinal (1731–1785)

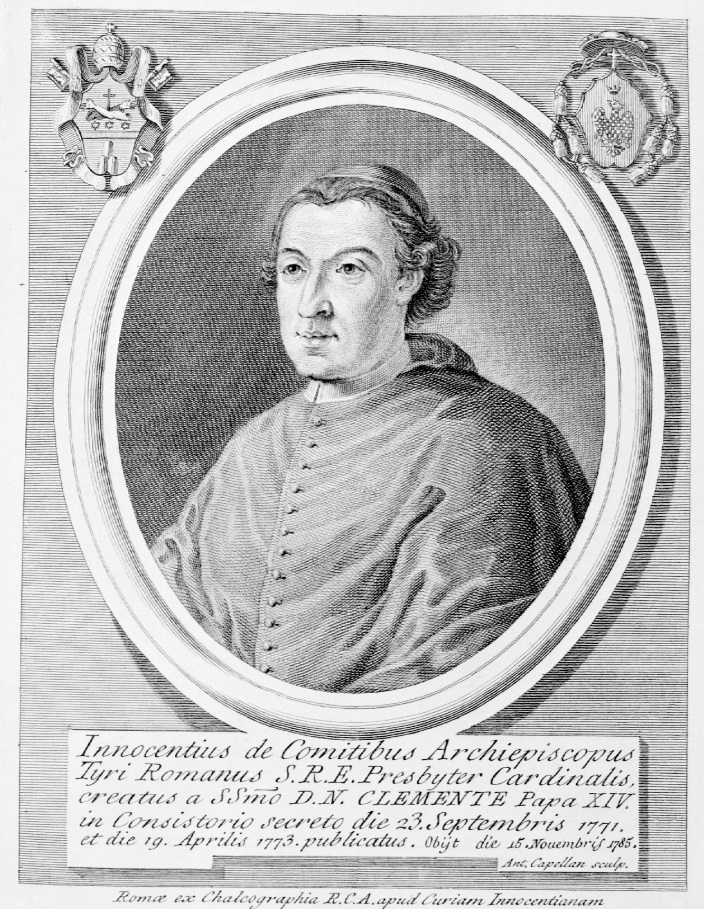
Innocenzo Conti by Antonio Capellan

Innocenzo Conti (8 February 1731 – 15 November 1785) was a cardinal of the Roman Catholic Church.

In November 1769, he was appointed Apostolic Nuncio to Portugal. The next month, he was made archbishop. He was appointed by Pope Clement XIV to be a cardinal in pectore in September 1771, but this was not made public until 19 April 1773. He was not elevated to the position until 26 May 1774. He participated in the conclave of 1774–1775.
