= Charles Joseph Flipart =

French painter

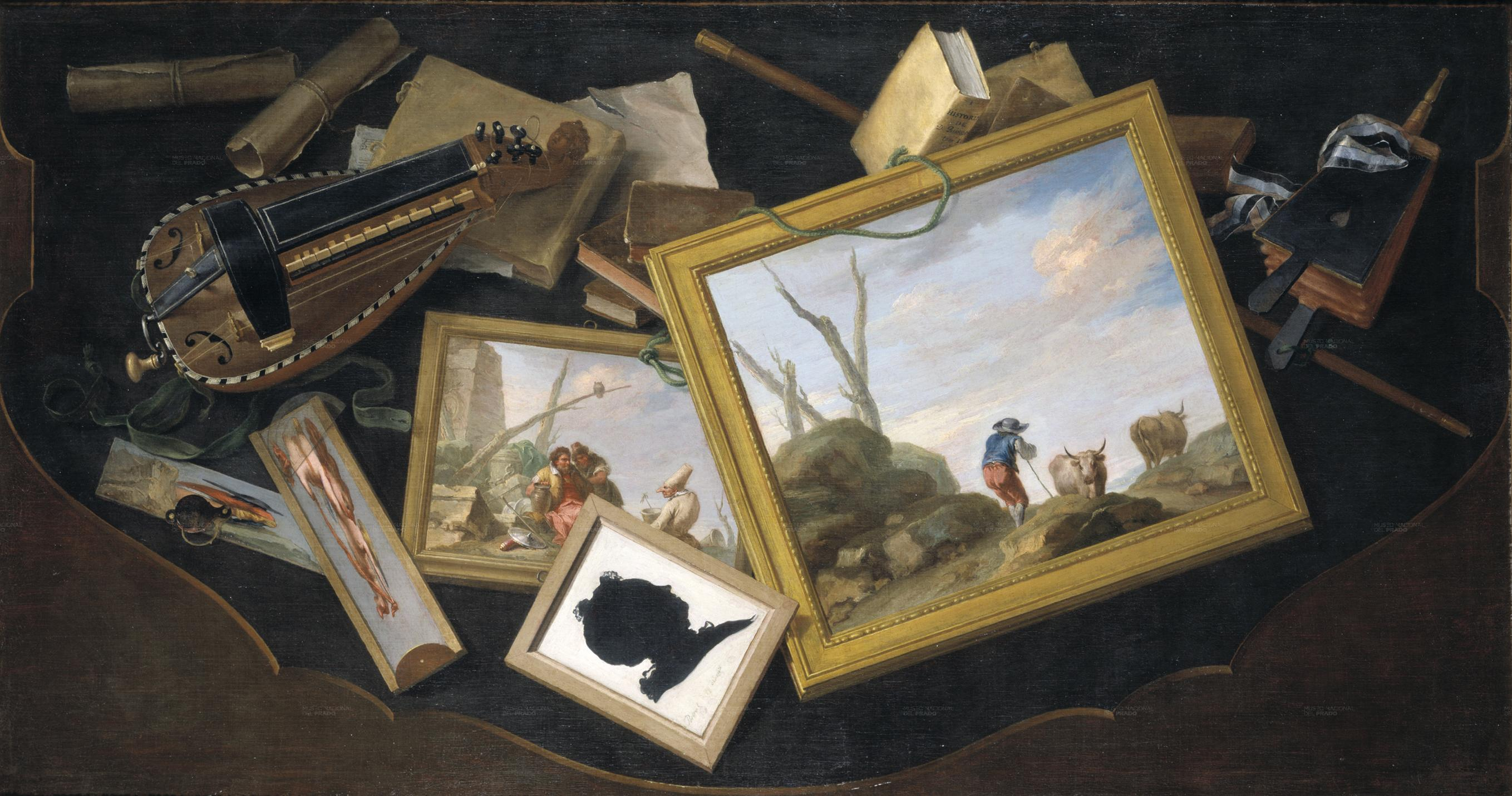
Charles-Joseph Flipart, Still Life, c. 1779, oil on canvas, 91 × 171 cm. Museo del Prado, Spain

Charles-Joseph Flipart (1721–1797) was a French painter and engraver.

== Life ==
He was born in Paris to Jean-Charles Flipart, also an engraver, and his wife Maria (Boll); Jean-Jacques Flipart was his brother. He was baptized in the parish of Saint-Severin. Initially he trained under his father. He later visited Venice, and studied painting under Tiepolo and Amigoni, and engraving under Joseph Wagner. After staying for some time in Rome he was appointed court painter and engraver by King Ferdinand VI of Spain in 1750. His best plates are the portraits of the King and the Queen of Spain. Some of his paintings are in two of the churches at Madrid, where he died in 1797.
