= Francesco Tironi =

Italian painter

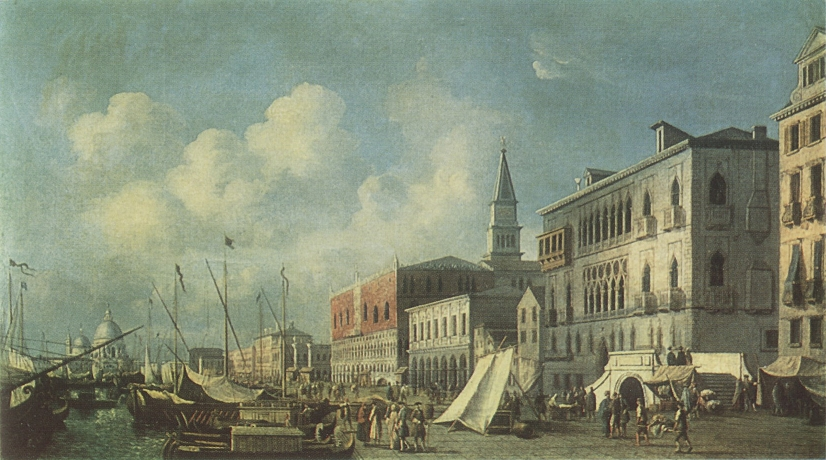
Quay in Venice

Francesco Tironi (circa 1745–1797) was an Italian painter, active in painting vedute of Venice in a Neoclassical style.

Among his works are a vedute of the Riva degli Schiavoni; of a Large Crowd in a Piazza before the Church of Santi Giovanni e Paolo; of the Isola Santa Maria della Grazia, Venice; and of the Meeting of Pope Pius VI and the Doge on the Island of San Giorgio in Alga He also provided the drawings for Antonio Sandi's twenty-four engravings (1779) of islands in the Venetian Lagoon. Many of the engravings depict thriving communities in islands that are now desolate.
