= David Horner (disambiguation) =

David Horner is the name of:

- David Murray Horner (born 1948), Australian military historian and academic.
- David Stuart Horner (1900-1983), English crime fiction novelist and the longtime partner of Osbert Sitwell
