= Giuliano Giampiccoli =

Italian painter

Landcape with Ancient Ruins, 1739-1740, Rijksmuseum, Amsterdam

Giuliano Giampiccoli (1698 – 10 December 1759) was an Italian engraver of vedute and architectural renderings.

== Biography ==
He was born in Belluno, Republic of Venice, the son of Girolamo Giampiccoli (also sometimes written as Gianpiccoli, Iampicoli, Zampicoli, and Gampiccoli) and Livia Ricci, the sister of the painter Marco Ricci. His brother Marco Sebastiano (1706–1782) was also an engraver.

He collaborated with a young Giovanni Battista Tiepolo in a series of etchings of classical ruins for the British Consul Joseph Smith. He also participated in a volume of engravings of villas in Tuscany after designs of Giuseppe Zocchi, with other collaborators including Giuseppe Benedetti, Filippo Morghen, Pietro Monaco, Joseph Wagner, Marcantonio Corsi, Giuseppe Filosi, Niccolo Mogalli, Philothee-François Duflos, Michele Marieschi, Vincenzo Franceschini, Johann Sebastien Müller, and Giovanni Battista Piranesi.
