= Antonio Capellan =

Italian engraver (c. 1740–1793)

Antonio Capellan (c. 1740 in Venice – 1793 in Rome) was an Italian engraver, active in a Neoclassical style.

He trained with Joseph Wagner. Capellan is best known for making engraved copies of masterworks of the Italian Renaissance found in private collections, which were published in Gavin Hamilton's work, Schola Italica Picturae.

He also engraved a series of portraits of cardinals titled "Calcographia R.C.A. apud Pedem Marmoreum". In 1759, he engraved portraits of Michelangelo and Giorgio Vasari for a volume of the life of Vasari, curated by Bottari.
