= Fabrizio Romondini =

Italian football manager

Personal information
- Date of birth: 24 April 1977 (age 49)
- Place of birth: Rome, Italy
- Height: 1.85 m (6 ft 1 in)
- Position: Midfielder

Youth career
- AS Roma

Senior career*
Years	Team	Apps	(Gls)
1996–1997	AS Roma	2	(0)
1997–2000	Albacete	15	(3)
1998–1999	→ Pistoiese (loan)	13	(0)
2001–2003	Giugliano	64	(11)
2003–2005	Padova	68	(4)
2005–2006	Salernitana	13	(1)
2006–2007	Cavese	16	(2)
2007–2008	Venezia	28	(3)
2008	Spezia	4	(0)
2008–2009	Avellino	11	(0)
2009	Olympiacos Volos	0	(0)
2009–2011	Cisco Roma	1	(0)
2011	Pergocrema	0	(0)

Managerial career
- 2021–2022: Atletico Terme Fiuggi
- 2022–2023: Tivoli
- 2023: Monterosi
- 2023–2024: Monterosi
- * Club domestic league appearances and goals as of 21:19, 9 March 2010 (UTC)

Fabrizio Romondini (born 24 April 1977) is an Italian football coach and former player.

== Playing career ==
Romondini formerly played for AS Roma, Albacete, Pistoiese, Giugliano, Padova, Salernitana, Cavese, Venezia and Spezia.

His move to Albacete was part of the transfer of Iván Helguera to Roma.

On 28 January 2009, Romondini terminated his contract with Avellino of the Italian Serie B, and signed a contract with Olympiacos Volos which ran until June 2010.

== Coaching career ==
After serving as assistant to Giuseppe Incocciati at Serie D club Atletico Terme Fiuggi, Romondini was later promoted to head coach for the 2021–22 season. He then left Fiuggi to accept the head coaching job at Serie D club Tivoli in December 2022, being however sacked in January 2023.

On 10 July 2023, Romondini took on his first head coaching role in professionalism, being appointed in charge of Serie C club Monterosi. He was dismissed on 28 September 2023 following a negative start in the club's season. He was called back in charge of Monterosi on 11 December 2023, with the club dead last in the league table, only to be dismissed for a second time just almost two months later, on 5 February 2024.
