= Antonio Sandi =

Italian engraver (1733–1817)

Antonio Sandi (9 October 1733 - 4 September 1817) was an Italian engraver, mainly of vedute and maps of Venice and the Veneto.

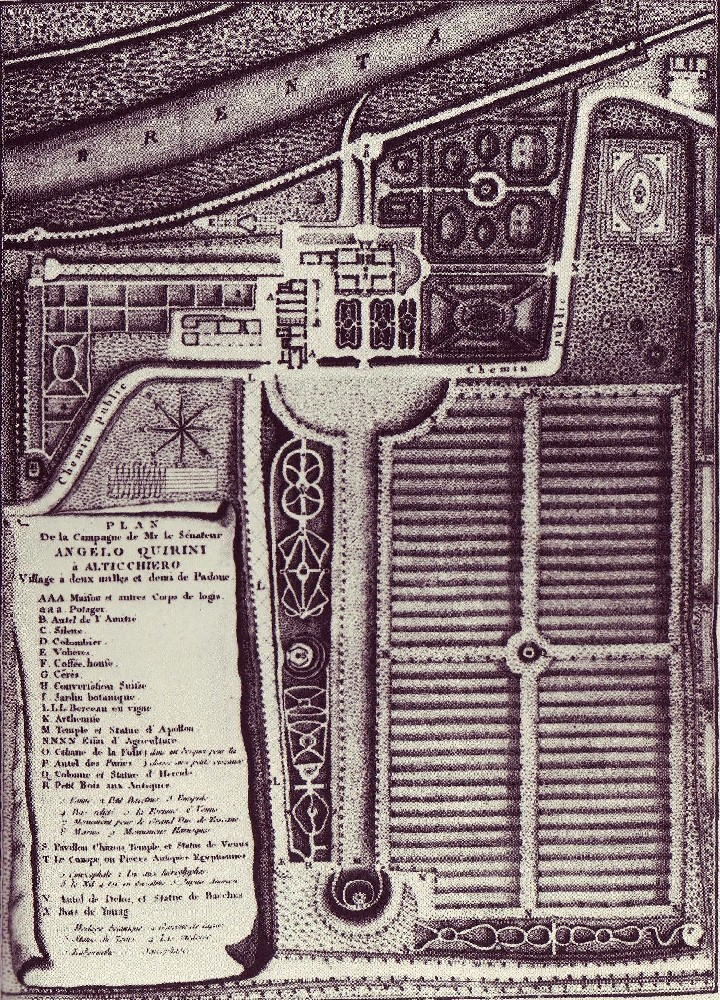
Map of the estate and Villa Querini ad Altichiero on the Brenta (no longer extant).

He was born in Puos d'Alpago in the province of Belluno in the Veneto, but lived and worked mainly in Venice. His brother Giuseppe (1763 -1803) was also an engraver. He died in Alpago. He collaborated with Francesco Tironi in producing a portfolio of twenty-four engravings (1779) of islands in the Venetian Lagoon. Many of the engravings depict thriving communities in islands that are now desolate.
