= Jean Charles Flipart =

French engraver

Jean-Charles Flipart (c. 1684–1751) was a French engraver. He was born in Paris. His sons Charles-Joseph and Jean-Jacques Flipart were engravers and the former, also a painter.

Among his plates are:

- Portrait of René Choppin, after Jannet
- Virgin and Child, after Raphael
- Christ praying on the Mount of Olives, after the same
- Penitent Magdalen, after Charles Le Brun
- Apollo and Daphne, after René-Antoine Houasse

== Gallery ==
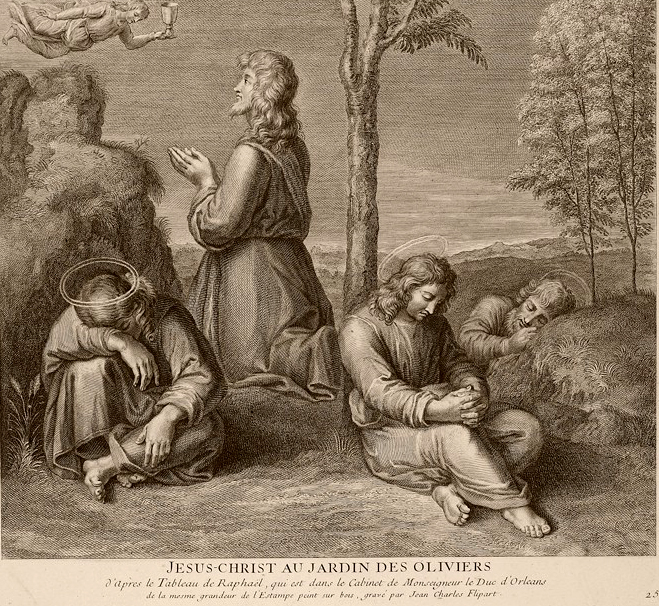
Christ praying on the Mount of Olives

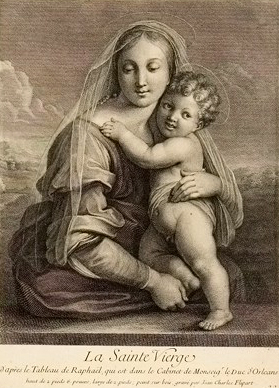
Virgin and Child

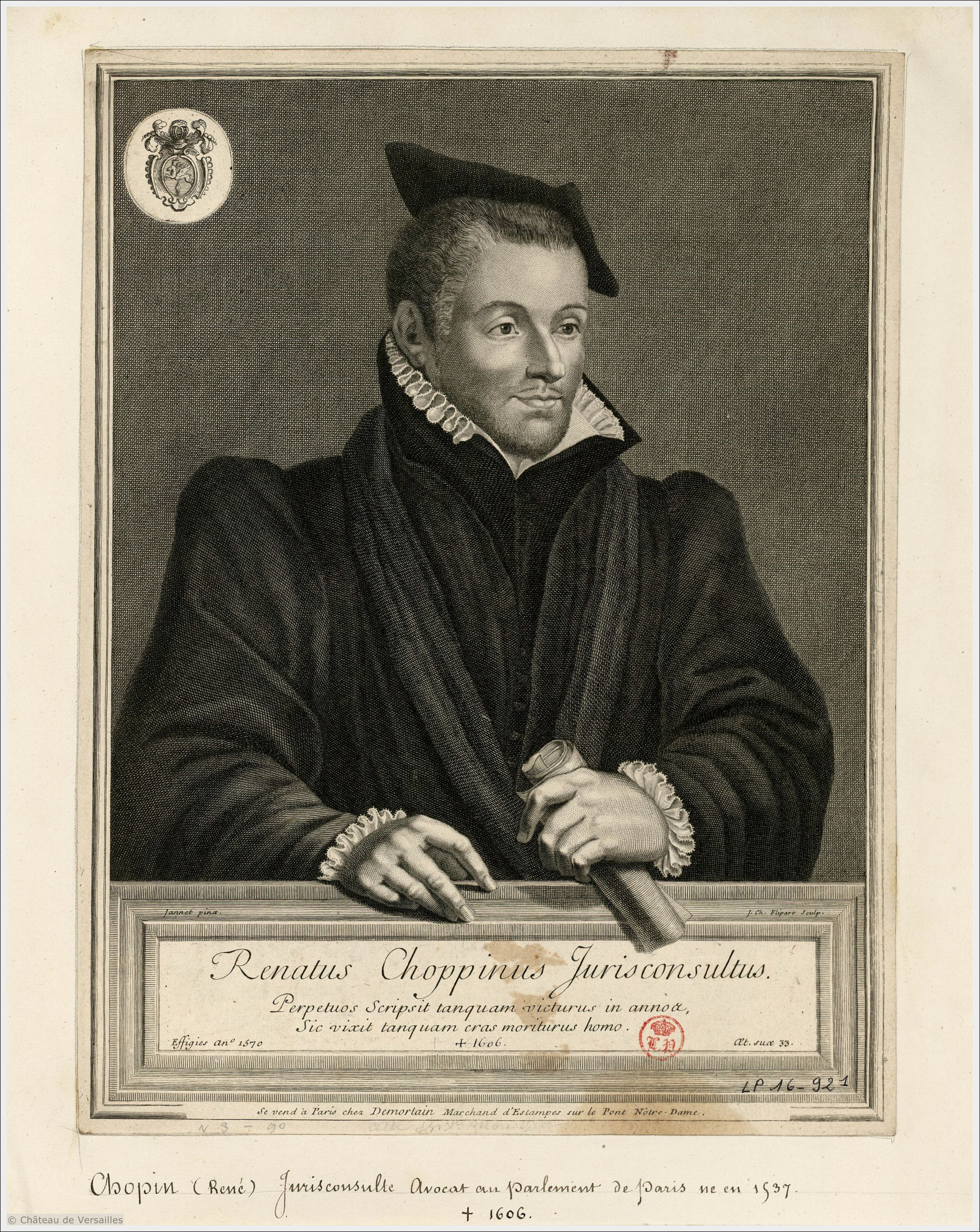
René Choppin d'Arnouville

== Bibliography ==
- Bryan, Michael (1886). Robert Edmund Graves (ed.). Dictionary of Painters and Engravers, Biographical and Critical. Vol. I: A-K. London: George Bell and Sons. p. 505.
