= Jean Jacques Flipart =

French engraver (1719–1782)

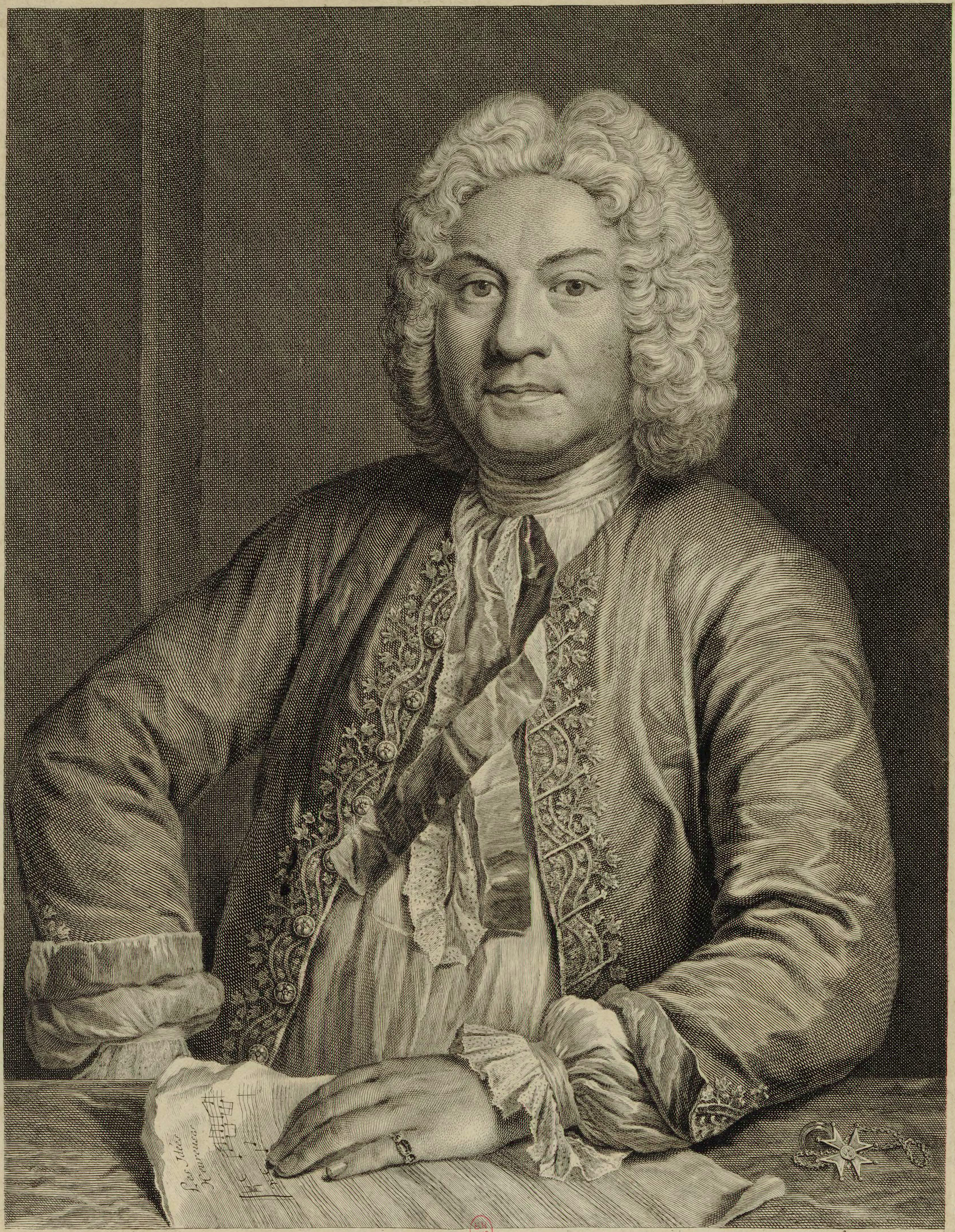
François Couperin, composer. Etching by Jean-Jacques Flipart, 1735, after painting by André Boüys

Jean Jacques Flipart (1719 – 10 July 1782) was a French engraver.

== Biography ==
Flipart was born in Paris. His father was the engraver Jean Charles Flipart, under whom he received his initial training in the engraver's art. His brother Charles Joseph Flipart, who was later noted both for his engraving and painting oeuvre, also received his initial training under the father's hand.

Flipart later trained under French engraving master Laurent Cars (1699–1771). He died in Paris in 1782.

== Engravings ==
Among the famous works of Flipart:

- Portrait of J. B. Greuze, A Sick Man surrounded by his Children (1767) and;Twelfth Night; after Greuze.
- Portrait of Jacques Dumont le Romain; after de la Tour.
- The Holy Family; after Giulio Romano.
- Adam and Eve; after Charles Joseph Natoire.
- Venus presenting the Arms to Aeneas; after the same.
- A Sea-storm at Night; after Vernet.
- A Sea-storm by Day; after the same.
- Christ curing the Paralytic; after Dietrich.
- A Bear-hunt; after Carle van Loo.
- A Tiger-hunt; after François Boucher.
- The Battle of the Centaurs and Lapiths.

== Gallery ==
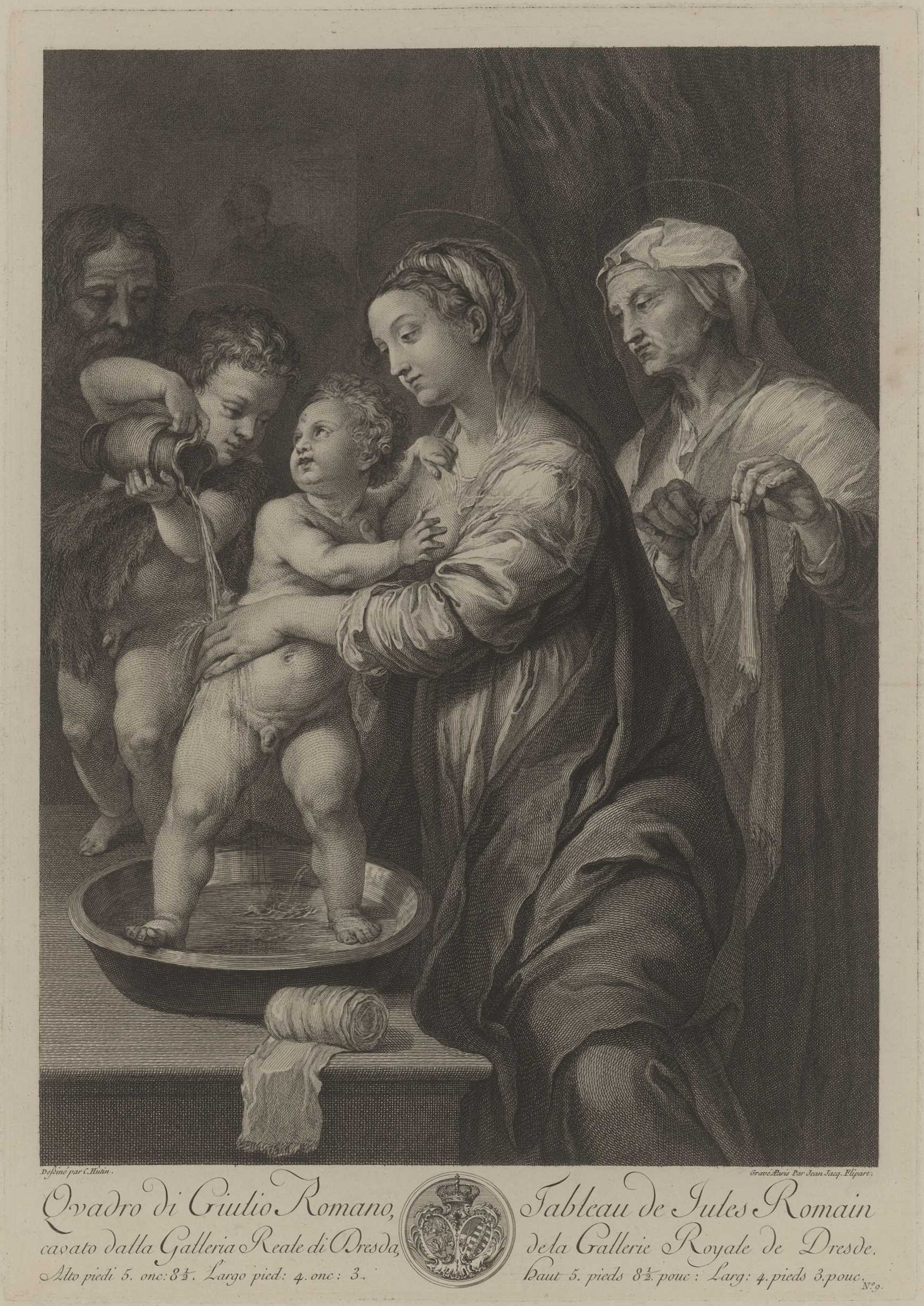
Madonna with the Washbasin (c. 1750)

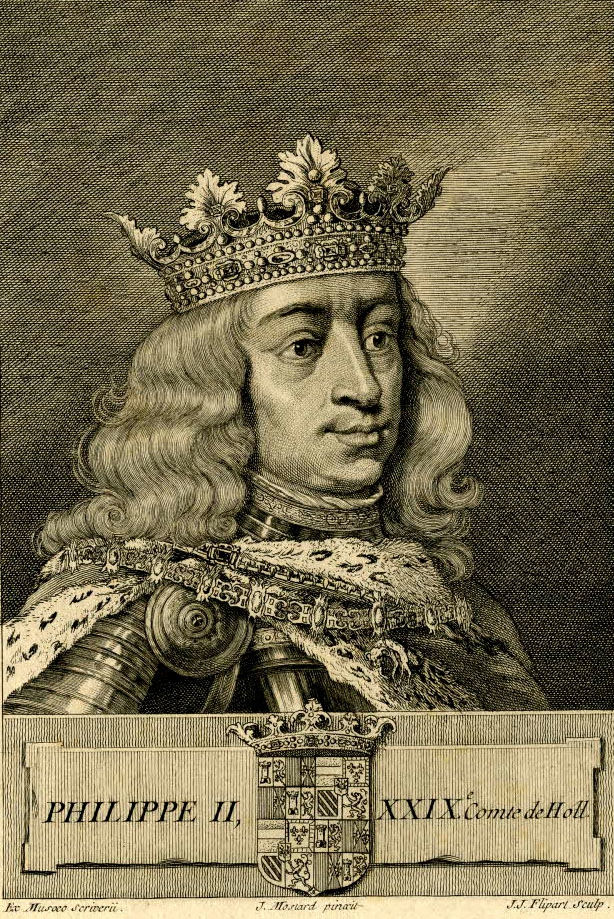
Philippe II

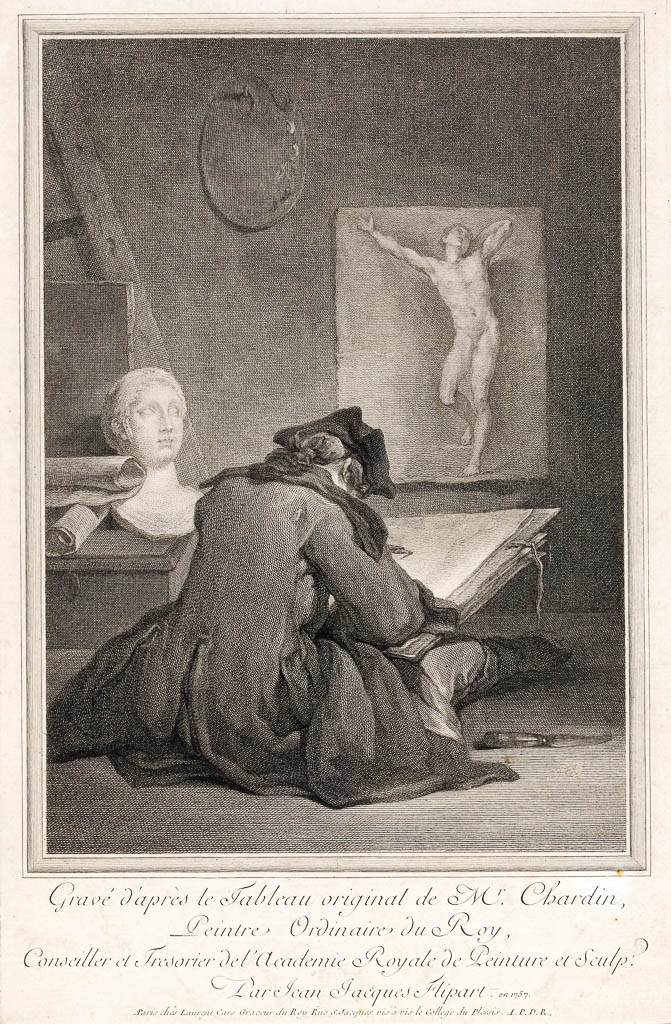
Le Dessinateur (1757)

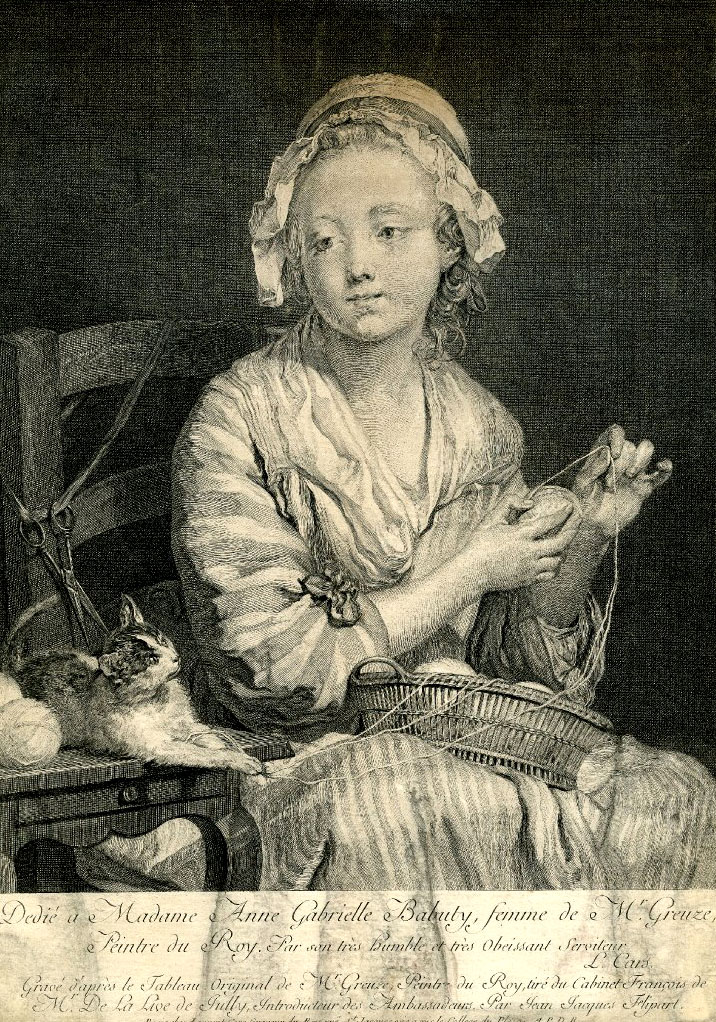
La Pelotonneuse

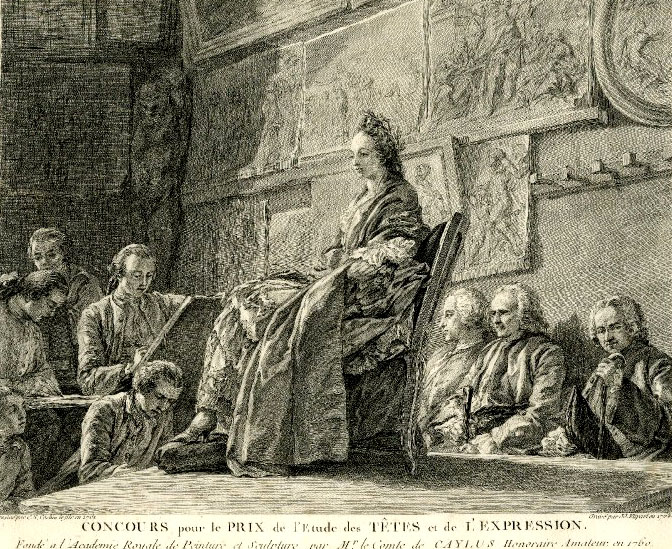
Competition for the Prize for the Study of Heads and Expression (1763)

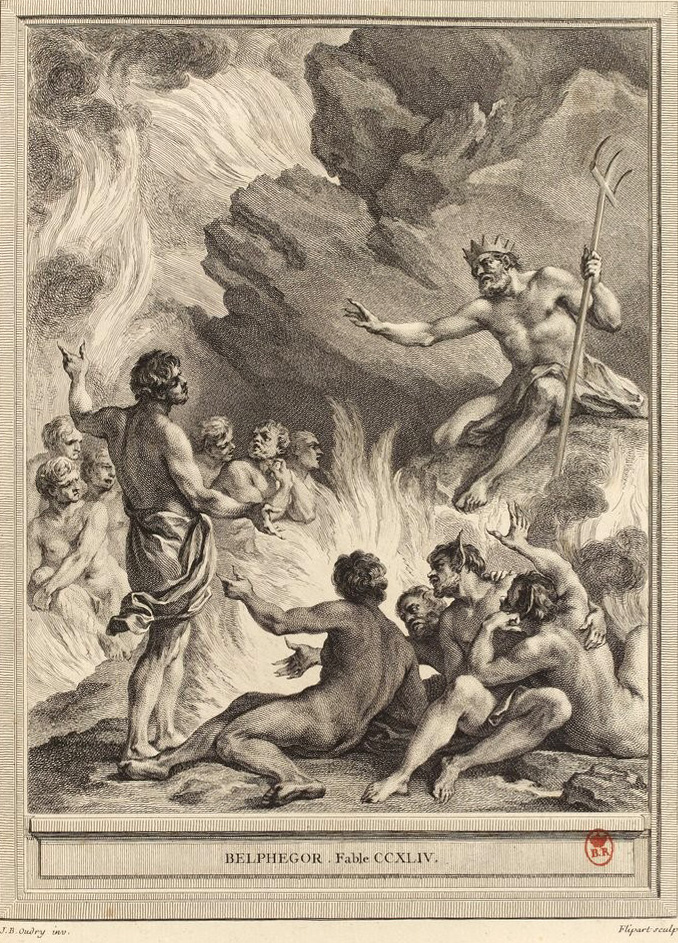
Belphegor

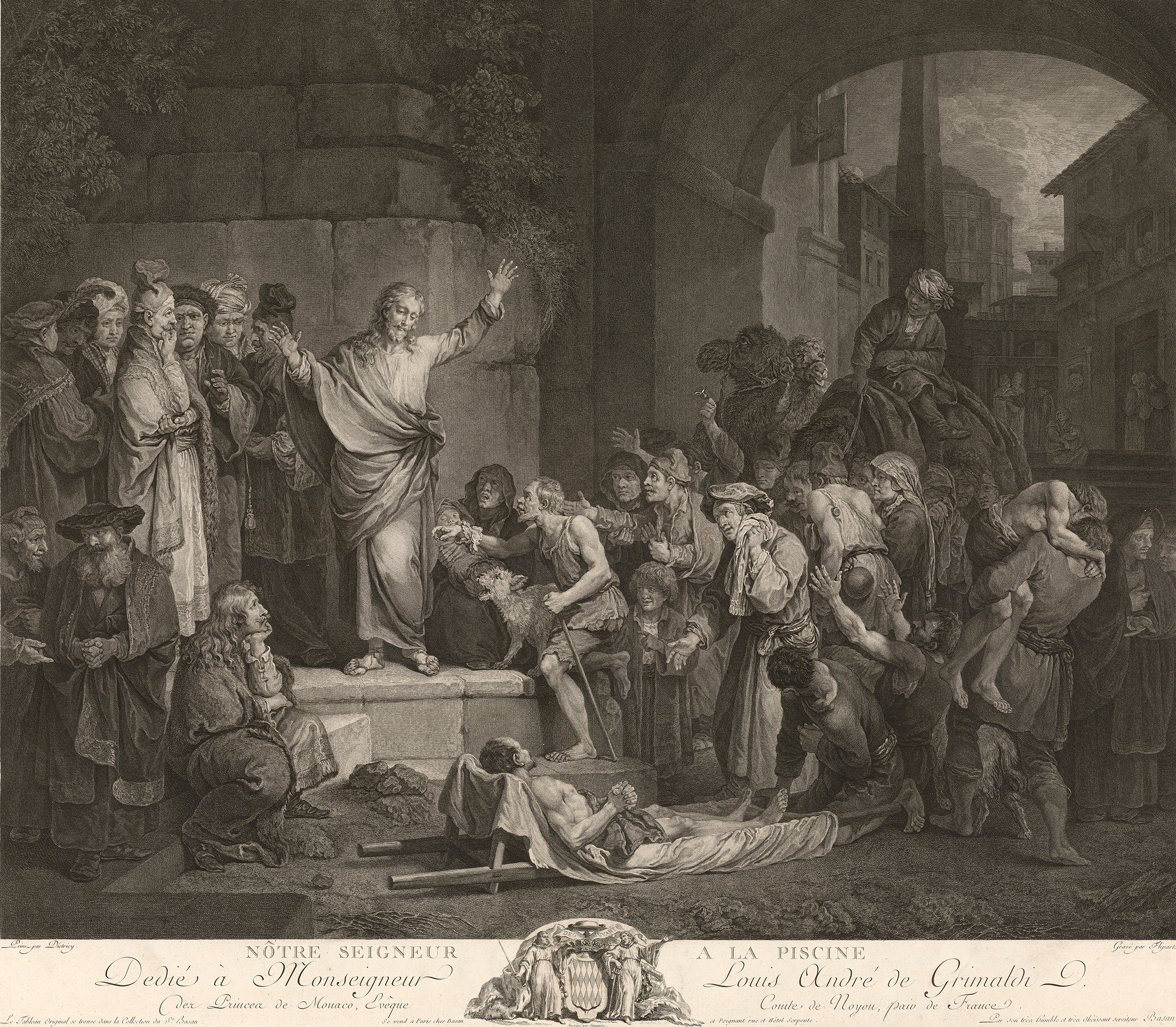
Jesus heals the paralyzed (1767)
