= Joseph Wagner (engraver) =

German engraver (1706-1786)

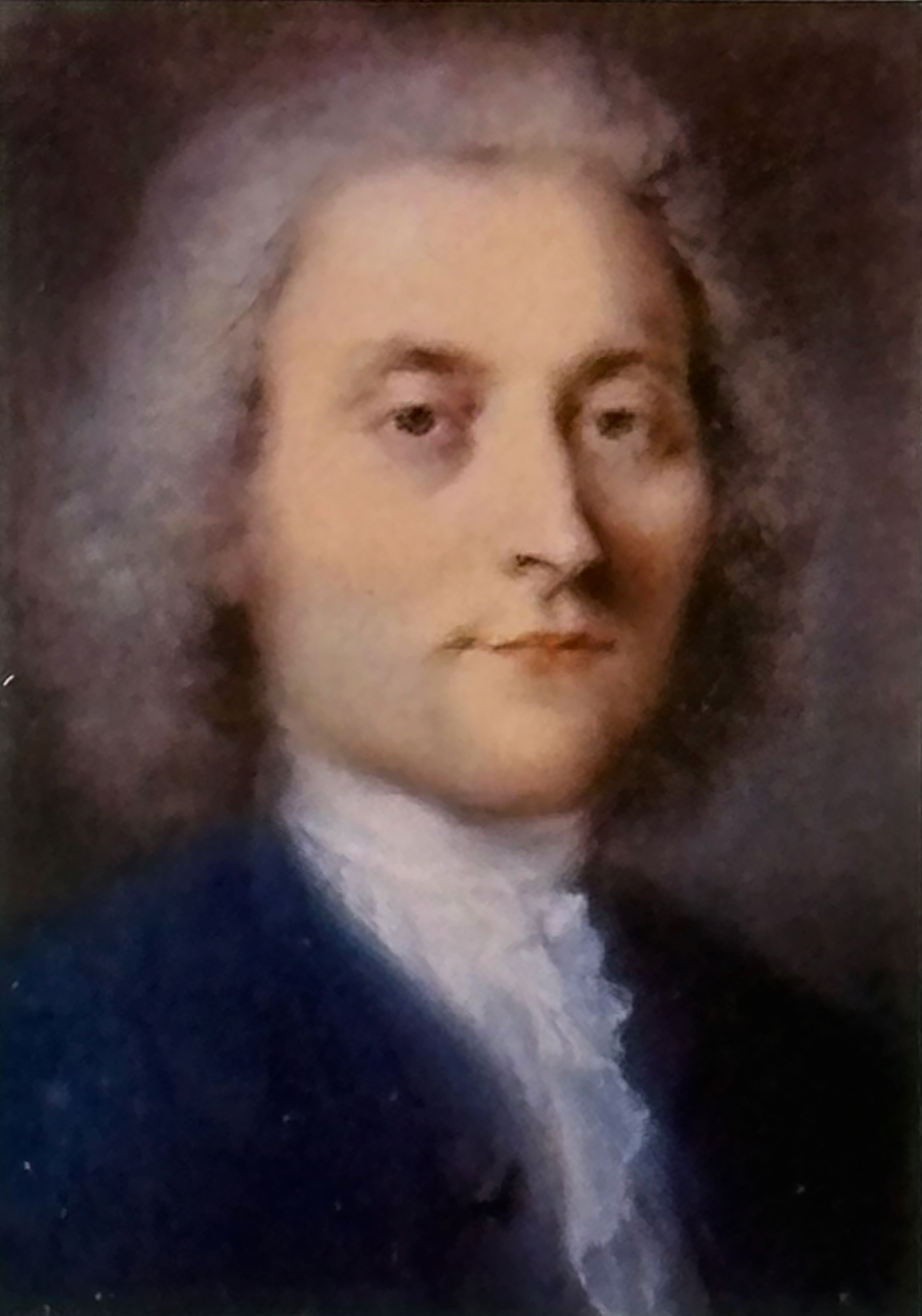
- Portrait of Joseph Wagner by Rosalba Carriera
- Born: 1706; Thalendorf, Bregenz-Hohenegg, Hapsburg Monarchy
- Died: 29 June 1786 (aged 79–80); Venice, Republic of Venice
- Known for: Engraver; printseller

Joseph Wagner (1706 – 1786) was an eighteenth century Austrian engraver and printseller. Born in Thalendorf, he became a longtime pupil, friend, and partner with Italian painter Jacopo Amigoni. Wagner spent seven years in London during the 1730s where he was one of the city's leading engravers. In 1739, he moved to Venice where he continued as an engraver, while also managing a workshop with numerous pupils, and carrying on a considerable business as a printseller. His engravings include portraits, sacred subjects, mythology, and landscapes. He received a privilege granted by the Venetian Senate in 1750. His workshop became the most prominent center of engravings in 18th-century Venice.

== Early life ==
Joseph Wagner was born in 1706 at the village of Thalendorf, near Lake Constance, within the Habsburg Monarchy. (Note: The birthplace of Wagner could also be the Austrian city of Bregenz, rather than Thalendorf, as attested in two sources: the collector Bernardo Cavagnis, writing about 1740, soon after Wagner's arrival in Venice; also, in the will of Joseph Wagner, dated 24 May 1786. Additionally, there is conflicting evidence about Wagner's birth year. The wedding certificate of Francesco Bartolozzi in 1755 gives Wagner's age as 48 years, indicating a birth year of 1706 or 1707. However, his obituary register from 1786 says that he died at the age of 81 years, which indicates a birth year of 1704 or 1705. Despite these caveats, Heinecken's 1768 description of Wagner with the birthplace of Thalendorf in 1706 stands out for the precision of its information.) Showing a talent for art at a young age, he was apprenticed to an unknown local painter. In 1720, seeking more advanced training, at the age of 14 years he journeyed to Munich, where he became a pupil of the Italian painter Jacopo Amigoni. While in Munich, he frequented the house of the court engraver Franz Xaver Späth. Most likely in 1728, Amigoni and Wagner travelled to Rome for a six month stay, followed by Bologna. Wagner remained in Bologna to complete his artistic studies, while Amigoni departed for London. Wagner's instructors in Bologna included Giovanni Battista Grati and Felice Torelli. The earliest known work by him dates to this period, a drawing of Samson.

== London and Paris ==
In 1732, Wagner left Bologna to join Amigoni in London. Noticing his greater predisposition for engraving rather than painting, Amigoni suggested to Wagner that he should focus on engraving. Wagner followed this advice, and started an engraving company, located on Silver Street from 1732 to 1734, and Great Marlborough Street from 1734 to 1739. The earliest known prints by Wagner, dating to 1733, are portraits of the daughters of King George II and Queen Caroline, the princesses Anne, Amelia, and Caroline. These portraits, while skillful in the rendering of volume, still show some uncertainty in the rendering of facial features. Another notable portrait, showing greater accomplishment, was that of the Italian castrato singer Farinelli, dated to 1735. Wagner accompanied Amigoni and Farinelli on trip to Paris in the summer of 1736. In Paris, at the workshop of Laurent Cars, Wagner increased his knowledge of the relatively new technique of combining etching and engraving. Only one print of Wagner survives from Paris, a depiction of St. John the Baptist, the first not based on a painting by Amigoni. In 1739, Wagner executed a Cries of London series after Amigoni, the four prints featuring a chimney sweep, an apple seller, a lamp-lighter, and a shoe shiner. By the end of his tenure in London, George Vertue considered Wagner to be one of the six best engravers in the city.

== Venice ==
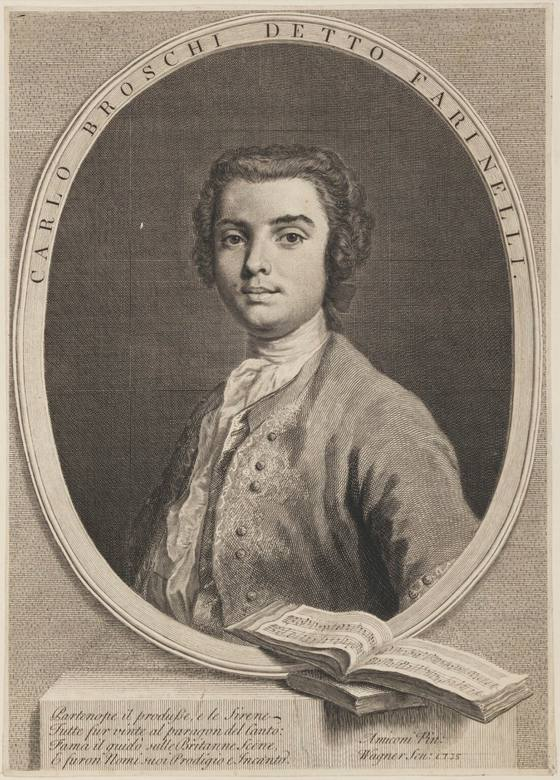
Etching and engraving by Joseph Wagner of Farinelli after Jacopo Amigoni, 1735.

Wagner and Amigoni arrived in Venice in 1739, with the intention of starting a partnership in an engraving company, at first based merely on verbal agreement. On 6 September 1742, Wagner married Camilla Capellan, the sister of the engraver Antonio Capellan. While uncertain, the location of Wagner's first workshop was likely between the church of San Lio and the Rialto Bridge, later moving to Merceria Street. Dating the prints from his workshops is difficult due to the lack of chronological references. The first known prints by Wagner in Venice were plates for the second volume of a book on Greek and Roman statuary, published in 1743. Continuing his relations with the English, Wagner translated one of his first landscapes in the possession of the collector Consul Smith, a mythological scene of Apollo and Daphne by Francesco Zuccarelli. He was also asked by Smith to engrave a self-portrait of Rosalba Carriera, done between 1744 and 1746. Wagner executed numerous prints after Giuseppe Zocchi which were very successful. In 1747, Amigoni left for Madrid, and prior to his departure, he and Wagner created a legal partnership for the workshop.

One of Wagner's most renowned pupils, the Florentine Francesco Bartolozzi, lived in his home and was treated like a son, with Wagner being the best man at his wedding in 1755. Bartolozzi created hundreds of prints in the Venetian workshop between 1748 and 1756, and again between 1757 and 1764. Other notable students were the Parisian Charles Joseph Flipart and Fabio Berardi. For those under his supervision, Wagner insisted on precision and fineness of detail. Engravings created by his workshop had a rather uniform style.

In response to plagiarism of the prints in his workshop by the rival Remondini firm located in Bassano del Grappa, in 1749 Wagner asked the Reformers of the University of Padua for a privilege in order to prevent copying. In their response, the Reformers noted the delicacy, exquisite workmanship, and industry demonstrated by Wagner. The request was granted by the Venetian Senate on 24 January 1750. It gave Wagner an exclusive 15 year privilege on every print produced in his workshop.

A catalogue of prints from Wagner's workshop, located now in the Cotton Library, and dating to no later than 1760, gives some insights to the prints being sold. Prints after Amigoni are the most common, including allegories and scenes of the Old Testament, the latter also by Giuseppe Zocchi. Additionally there were landscape engravings after Francesco Zuccarelli, Marco Ricci, and Franz de Paula Ferg. Prints of a popular nature, albeit of a lower quality, included many saints, biblical scenes and sacred subjects with Rococo details. Contributors to the engravings included Francesco Bartolozzi, Charles Joseph Flipart, Fabio Berardi, Antonio Capellan, Giuliano Giampiccoli, and Francois Vivares. Some of the prints are anonymous, perhaps due to multiple contributors. The prints had wide dissemination all over Europe, achieving success in the decorative arts such as furniture, screens, trays, writing boxes, and even as iconography for frescoes.

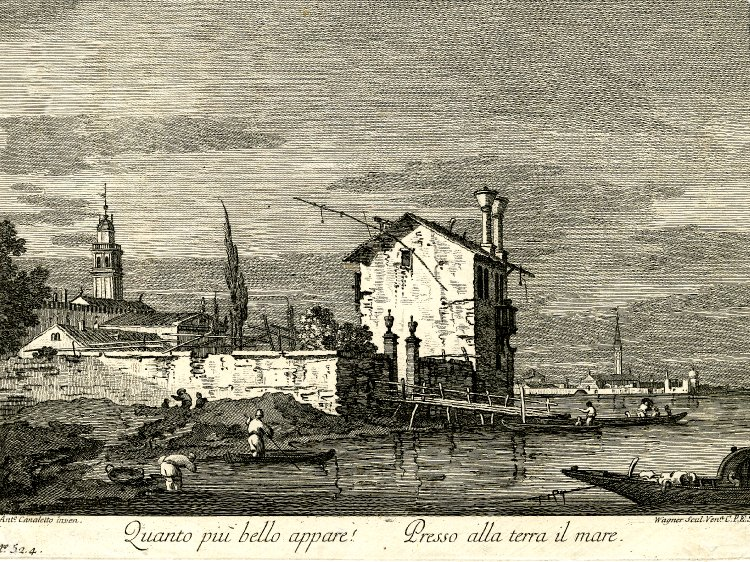
Landscape by Joseph Wagner after Canaletto.

After Amigoni's death in 1752, the joint company between Wagner and Amigoni was liquidated except for the copperplates, prints, and tools. A new firm, to last five years, was created between Wagner and Amigoni's widow, Maria Marchesini. In 1753, he collaborated on two volumes of prints depicting masterpieces owned by Augustus III of Poland. In 1755, Wagner was proclaimed an honorary academician of the Academy of Fine Arts of Bologna. The joint company between Wagner and Marchesini was dissolved in 1759. In the mid-1760s, Wagner began collaborating with Giovanni Volpato, one of the best engravers in the area. A letter by Volpato in 1763 said that Wagner used the highest quality ink available on the market, receiving orders for ink from Rome.

A second catalogue of Wagner's prints, dating to after 1768, shows an increasing focus on engraving landscapes. The catalogue included capriccios and Venetian churches after Canaletto, some of them by Wagner, displaying great technical skill. On 1 January 1771, a new joint company was formed with Gasparo Furlanetto, a printseller. In the same year, Wagner was named an honorary academician of the Academy of Fine Arts of Venice. The company between Wagner and Furlanetto was renewed in 1776. By this time, Wagner's workshop was the undisputed center of engraving production in Venice. He obtained a renewal of the privilege granted by the Venetian Senate in 1776. In this year, at age seventy, Wagner executed two of his most successful prints, portraits after Giuseppe Angeli. Few engravings from the workshop survive from the 1780s, mostly devotional scenes of lower quality. In his will written one month before his death, Wagner nominated his son Angelo as his universal heir, exhorting him to continue the workshop with his brother-in-law Fabio Berardi. Wagner died of a liver abscess on 29 June 1786 in Venice.

== Sources ==
- Boorsch, Suzanne (1997). Venetian Prints and Books in the Age of Tiepolo. New York: The Metropolitan Museum of Art. ISBN 0-87099-824-2 – via Internet Archive.
- Brinton, Selwyn (1903). Bartolozzi and His Pupils in England. New York: Frederick A. Stokes – via Internet Archive.
- Heinecken, Karl Heinrich von (1768). Nachrichten von Künstlern und Künstachen (in German). Vol. I. Leipzig – via Heidelberg University.
- Lo Giudice, Chiara (2017). Joseph Wagner incisore e imprenditore nell’Europa del Settecento (Ph. D. thesis) (in Italian). University of Padua.
- Lo Giudice, Chiara (2018). Joseph Wagner: Maestro dell'incisione nella Venezia del Settecento (in Italian). Sommacampagna, Verona: Cierre edizone. ISBN 978-88-8314-970-2.
