= Baracchi =

Baracchi is an Italian surname. Notable people with the surname include:

- Michelangelo Baracchi Bonvicini, Italian British writer
- Nico Baracchi (1957–2015), Swiss bobsledder and skeleton racer
- Pietro Baracchi (1851–1926), Italian-born Australian astronomer

== See also ==
- Trofeo Baracchi or the Baracchi Trophy, a major Italian cycling race starting the 1940s until 1991
