= Giuseppe Zocchi =

Italian painter

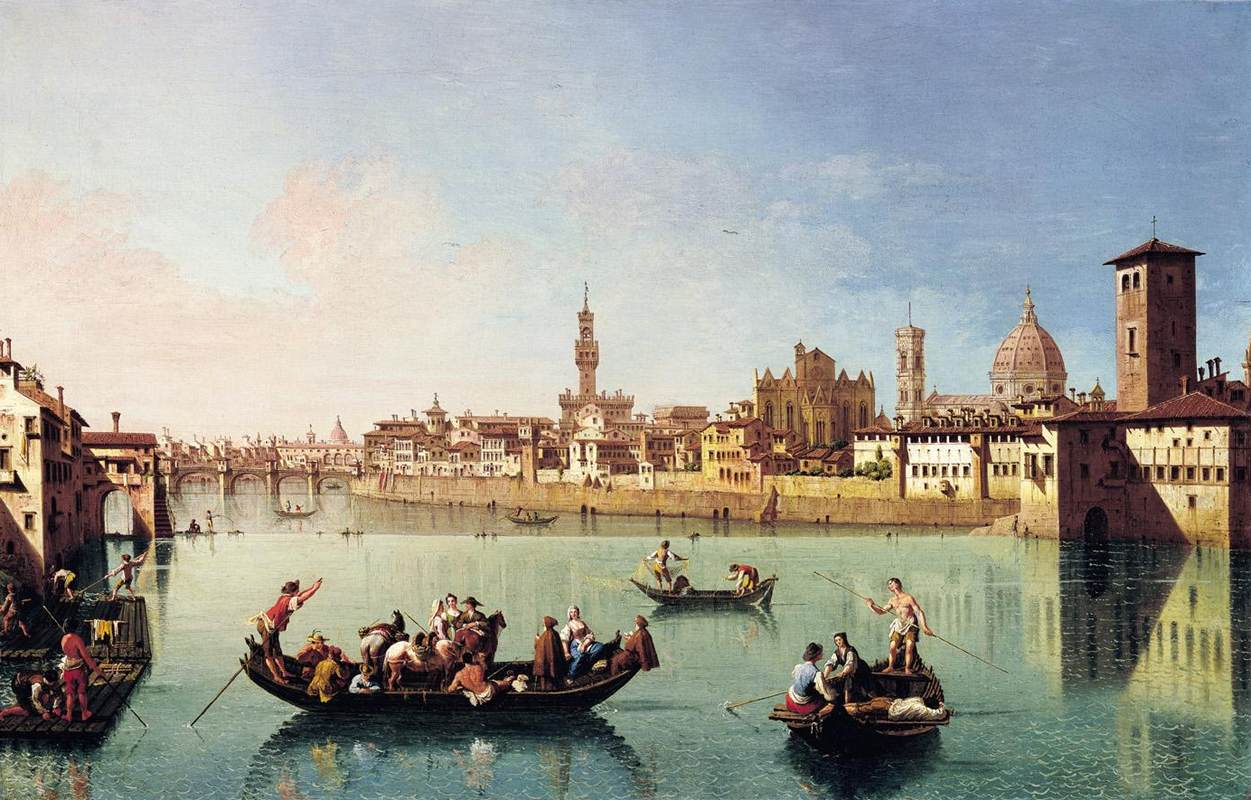
Giuseppe Zocchi View of the Arno in Florence .

Giuseppe Zocchi (Italian pronunciation: [dʒuˈzɛppe dˈdzɔkki]; c. 1711–1767) was an Italian painter and printmaker active in Florence and best known for his vedute of the city.

== Biography ==
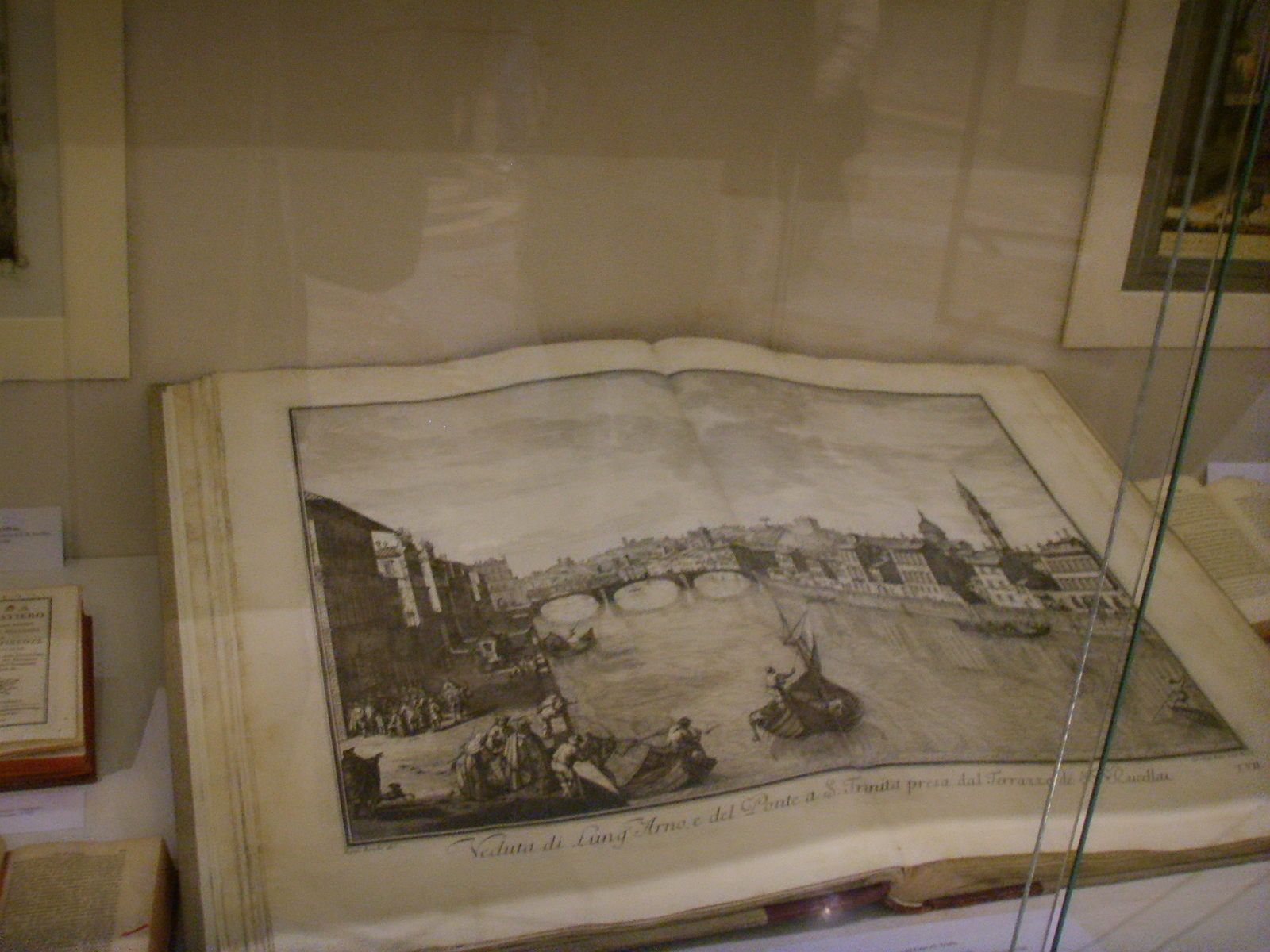
Original edition of Vedute di Firenze, Biblioteca Nazionale Centrale di Firenze

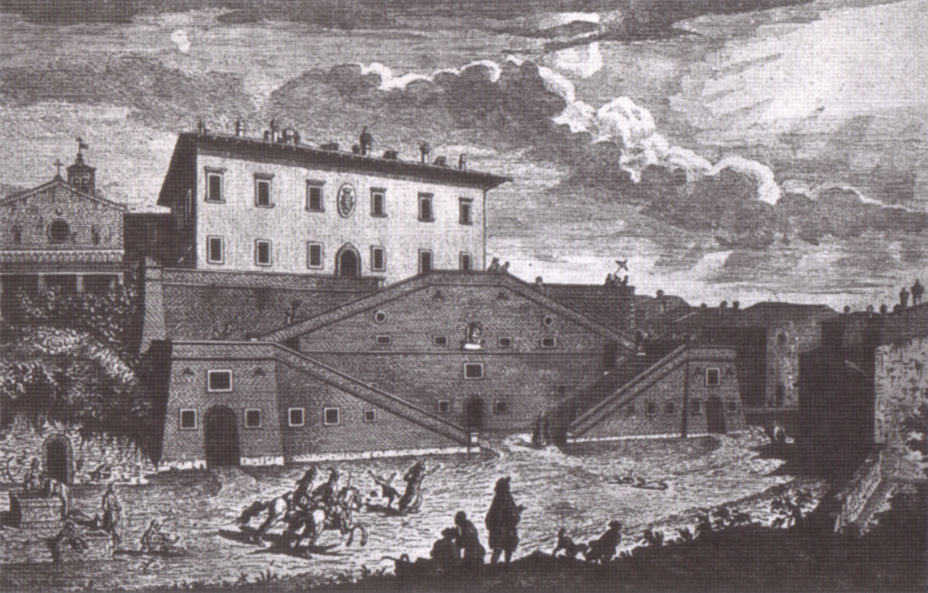
La Real Villa di Cerreto Guidi, 1744

Born into a poor family, Zocchi began his training in his native Florence. The Marchese Andrea Gerini became his patron when he was very young, patronizing his further studies in Venice, Milan, Bologna, and Rome.

The Marchese Andrea Gerini commissioned Zocchi to record all the famous Florentine landmarks, which he did in a series of drawings, now in New York's Pierpont Morgan Library. A number of engravers based their etchings on Zocchi's drawings into engravings, which were issued in two series in 1744. One series consists of 25 vedute under the title Scelta XXIV vedute delle principali contrade, piazze, chiese, e palazzi della citta di Firenze; the other series consists of 50 vedute under the title Vedute delle ville e di altri luoghi della Toscana. The latter was published by Giuseppe Allegrini and included engravings by Zocchi himself, as well as Johann Gottfried Seutter, Giuseppe Benedetti, Pietro Monaco, Joseph Wagner, Giuseppe Filosi, Marc'Antonio Corsi, Niccolò Mogalli, Philoté François Duflos, Michele Marieschi, Vincenzo Franceschini, Giuliano Giampiccoli, Johann Sebastian Müller, and Giovanni Battista Piranesi.

He also painted frescoes for the Villa Serristori outside Porta Niccolò. He painted frescoes depicting the Four Seasons in Palazzo Rinuccini. He also painted frescoes in the Gallery of the Gerini palace. He depicted in oil paintings the festivals held in Siena to celebrate the visit of Francis I Augustus. he was afflicted with the plague that ran through Siena and died upon returning to Florence.
