= Fabio Berardi (engraver) =

Italian engraver (1728–1788)

Fabio Berardi (1728–1788) was an Italian engraver of the Baroque period, active in Tuscany. He was born in Siena. He went to Venice when young, and trained under Joseph Wagner. Among other works, he engraved in 1767 a booklet of pictures about the life of emperor Francis I. He also engraved the following:

  1. St. Seraphinus worshipping the Cross (1767)
  2. A Woman sleeping, surprised by a Sportsman and Four Pastoral Subjects after Piazzetta.
  3. Isaac blessing Jacob and a Sacrifice of Gideon after Pittoni
  4. Jacob and Rachel after Giuseppe Varotti
  5. Hagar and Ishmael in the Desert after J. Varana.
  6. Six Views in Venice (1742); after Canaletto; engraved by Berardi and Wagner.

== Sources ==
- Ticozzi, Stefano (1830). Dizionario degli architetti, scultori, pittori, intagliatori in rame ed in pietra, coniatori di medaglie, musaicisti, niellatori, intarsiatori d'ogni etá e d'ogni nazione' (Volume 1). Milan: Gaetano Schiepatti. p. 143.
- Bryan, Michael (1886). Robert Edmund Graves (ed.). Dictionary of Painters and Engravers, Biographical and Critical. Vol. I: A-K. London: George Bell and Sons. p. 113.
