= Remondini (firm) =

Italian family of printers (mid-17th century to 1860)

Remondini was a firm of print publishers, based in Bassano del Grappa from the mid-17th century to 1860, which was run by consecutive generations of the Remondini family:

- Giovanni Antonio (1634–1711), the founder;
- Giuseppe (1672–1742), son of the above;
- Giovanni Antonio (1700–1769) and Giambattista (1713–1773), sons of the above;
- Giuseppe (1745–1811).
